= 2021 Georgia Tech Yellow Jackets baseball team =

Baseball team season

2021 Georgia Tech Yellow Jackets baseball

ACC Coastal Division champion

NCAA tournament, Nashville Regional
- Conference: Atlantic Coast Conference
- CB: No. 22
- Record: 31–25 (21–15 ACC)
- Head coach: Danny Hall (28th season)
- Assistant coaches: Zeke Pinkham (1st season); Nick Ascue (1st season)
- Hitting coach: James Ramsey (3rd season)
- Pitching coach: Danny Borrell (2nd season)
- Captains: Luke Waddell; Brant Hurter; Hugh Chapman; Colin Hall
- Home stadium: Russ Chandler Stadium

2021 Atlantic Coast Conference baseball standings
	Conf.				Overall
Team	W		L	PCT	W		L	PCT
Atlantic
No. 10 Notre Dame ^{x}‍‍‍^{y}	25	–	10	.714	34	–	13	.723
No. 4 NC State ‍‍‍^{y}	19	–	14	.576	37	–	19	.661
Florida State ‍‍‍^{y}	20	–	16	.556	31	–	24	.564
Louisville ‍‍‍	16	–	16	.500	28	–	22	.560
Clemson ‍‍‍	16	–	20	.444	25	–	27	.481
Wake Forest ‍‍‍	10	–	22	.313	20	–	27	.426
Boston College ‍‍‍	10	–	23	.303	21	–	28	.429
Coastal
Georgia Tech ^{x}‍‍‍^{y}	21	–	15	.583	31	–	25	.554
Miami (FL) ‍‍‍^{y}	20	–	15	.571	33	–	21	.611
Virginia ‍‍‍^{y}	18	–	18	.500	36	–	27	.571
North Carolina ‍‍‍^{y}	18	–	18	.500	28	–	27	.509
Duke ‍‍‡‍^{y}	16	–	17	.485	33	–	22	.600
Pittsburgh ‍‍‍	16	–	17	.485	23	–	20	.535
Virginia Tech ‍‍‍	16	–	20	.444	27	–	25	.519
x – Division champion ‡ – Tournament champion y – Invited to the NCAA tournament As of July 1, 2021; Rankings from D1Baseball

The 2021 Georgia Tech Yellow Jackets baseball team represented Georgia Tech during the 2021 NCAA Division I baseball season. The Yellow Jackets played their home games at Russ Chandler Stadium as a member of the Atlantic Coast Conference. They were led by head coach Danny Hall, in his 28th season at Georgia Tech.

Georgia Tech finished the regular season winning the Coastal Division. In the 2021 ACC baseball tournament, the Yellow Jackets reached the semifinals before losing to NC State. Georgia Tech earned an at-large bid into the 2021 NCAA Division I baseball tournament, where they were the second seed in the Nashville Regional. They were eliminated by Vanderbilt in the Regional. Georgia Tech finished the season with a 31–25 overall record.

== Previous season ==
The 2020 Georgia Tech Yellow Jackets baseball team notched a 11–5 (2–1) regular season record. The season prematurely ended on March 12, 2020, due to concerns over the COVID-19 pandemic.

== Personnel ==
=== Roster ===
2021 Georgia Tech Yellow Jackets baseball roster
Pitchers: 2 - Dalton Smith - Freshman; 8 - Marquis Grissom Jr. - Freshman; 12 - Jackson Finley - Freshman; 15 - Hugh Chapman - Junior; 16 - Will Coquillard - Freshman; 19 - Cort Roedig - Sophomore; 21 - Brant Hurter - Junior; 22 - Chance Huff - Sophomore; 24 - Brody Westbrooks - Freshman; 27 - Luke Bartnicki - Sophomore; 32 - Joseph Mannelly - (redshirt) Sophomore; 34 - Will Shirah - (redshirt) Sophomore; 35 - Dawson Brown - Freshman; 36 - Sam Crawford - (redshirt) Sophomore; 37 - Xander Stephens - Freshman; 39 - Jake Brace - Freshman; 41 - Zach Maxwell - Freshman; 45 - Andy Archer - (redshirt) Junior; 46 - Ben King - Freshman; 47 - Tyler Watson - Freshman; 48 - Josiah Siegel - Freshman; 55 - John Medich - (redshirt) Junior	Catchers: 4 - Kevin Parada - Freshman; 11 - Jake Holland - Freshman; 18 - Cameron Turley - Junior; 20 - Jamie Taylor - Junior; Infielders: 6 - Jadyn Jackson - Freshman; 7 - Luke Waddell - Junior; 9 - Charlie Benson - Sophomore; 10 - Andrew Jenkins - Freshman; 25 - Drew Compton - Freshman; 28 - Dylan Strickland - Freshman; 29 - John Anderson - Freshman; 40 - John Giesler - Freshman; 42 - Justyn-Henry Malloy - Sophomore	Outfielders: 1 - Tres Gonzalez - Freshman; 3 - Jake DeLeo - Freshman; 5 - Colin Hall - Junior; 23 - Stephen Reid - Freshman; 38 - Tervell Johnson - Freshman; Utility: 12 - Jackson Finley - Freshman; 14 - Austin Wilhite - Senior; 26 - Hank Thomas - Freshman; 50 - Brad Grenkoski - Freshman

=== Coaching staff ===
2021 Georgia Tech Yellow Jackets baseball coaching staff
Name	Position	Seasons at Georgia Tech	Alma mater
Danny Hall	Head coach	28	Miami University (1977)
Danny Borrell	Pitching Coach	2	Wake Forest University (2009)
James Ramsey	Hitting Coach	3	Florida State University (2012)
Zeke Pinkham	Volunteer Assistant Coach	1	University of Louisville (2019)
Nick Ascue	Director of Baseball Operations	1	Xavier University (2018)
Steve Tamborra	Player Development Coach	22	Florida State University (1994)
Paul Wolkoff	Assistant Director of Sports Medicine	7	Georgia Institute of Technology (2008)

== Game log ==
2021 Georgia Tech Yellow Jackets baseball game log (31–25)
Legend: = Win = Loss = Canceled Bold = Georgia Tech team member * Non-conference game
Regular season (28–21)

February (6–1)
Date	Time (ET)	TV	Opponent	Rank	Stadium	Score	Win	Loss	Save	Attendance	Overall	ACC	Sources
February 19	2:00 p.m.	ACCNX	Eastern Kentucky*	No. 15	Russ Chandler Stadium; Atlanta, Georgia	**W** 12–6	**Finley (1–0)**	Williams (0–1)	—	713	1–0	—	Box Score; Recap
February 20	2:30 p.m.	ACCNX	Eastern Kentucky*	No. 15	Russ Chandler Stadium	**L** 6–9	Kelly (1–0)	**Archer (0–1)**	Brian (1)	713	1–1	—	Box Score; Recap
February 21	2:00 p.m.	ACCNX	Eastern Kentucky*	No. 15	Russ Chandler Stadium	**W** 7–1	**Crawford (1–0)**	Lewis (0–1)	—	713	2–1	—	Box Score; Recap
February 24	1:00 p.m.	ACCNX	Mercer*	No. 15	Russ Chandler Stadium	**W** 7–3	**Mannelly (1–0)**	Green (0–1)	Bartnicki (1)	713	3–1	—	Box Score; Recap
February 26	3:00 p.m.	ACCNX	at No. 13 NC State	No. 15	Doak Field; Raleigh, North Carolina	**W** 9–2	**Hurter (1–0)**	Justice (0–1)	—	198	4–1	1–0	Box Score; Recap
February 27	3:00 p.m.	ACCNX	at No. 13 NC State	No. 15	Doak Field	**W** 8–3	**Smith (1–1)**	Klyman (1–2)	**Finley (1)**	198	5–1	2–0	Box Score; Recap
February 28	3:00 p.m.	ACCNX	at No. 13 NC State	No. 15	Doak Field	**W** 8–4	**King (1–0)**	Villaman (0–1)	—	327	6–1	3–0	Box Score; Recap

March (7–6)
Date	Time (ET)	TV	Opponent	Rank	Stadium	Score	Win	Loss	Save	Attendance	Overall	ACC	Sources
March 3	4:00 p.m.	ACCNX	Georgia State*	No. 10	Russ Chandler Stadium	**L** 1–10	Patel (1–2)	**Roedig (0–1)**	—	713	6–2	—	Box Score; Recap
March 5	4:00 p.m.	ACCNX	No. 3 Louisville	No. 10	Russ Chandler Stadium	**L** 6–13	Kirian (2–0)	**Hurter (1–1)**	—	713	6–3	3–1	Box Score; Recap
March 6	2:00 p.m.	ACCNX	No. 3 Louisville	No. 10	Russ Chandler Stadium	**W** 19–6	**Archer (1–1)**	Elliott (1–1)	—	713	7–3	4–1	Box Score; Recap
March 7	3:00 p.m.	ACCNX	No. 3 Louisville	No. 10	Russ Chandler Stadium	**W** 13–9	**Finley (2–0)**	Smith (2–1)	—	713	8–3	5–1	Box Score; Recap
March 12	7:00 p.m.	ACCNX	No. 19 Pitt	No. 7	Russ Chandler Stadium	**L** 9–11	Pouliot (2–0)	**Bartnicki (0–1)**	McCrum (3)	713	8–4	5–2	Box Score; Recap
March 13	6:00 p.m.	ACCNX	No. 19 Pitt	No. 7	Russ Chandler Stadium	**W** 5–3	**Archer (2–1)**	Gilbertson (2–2)	—	713	9–4	6–2	Box Score; Recap
March 14	1:00 p.m.	ACCNX	No. 19 Pitt	No. 7	Russ Chandler Stadium	**L** 12–18	Hansen (1–0)	**Crawford (1–1)**	—	713	9–5	6–3	Box Score; Recap
March 17	3:00 p.m.	ACCN	Georgia Southern*	No. 11	Russ Chandler Stadium	Postponed (inclement weather), makeup date TBD					9–5	—	Report
March 19	6:00 p.m.	ACCNX	at Wake Forest	No. 11	David F. Couch Ballpark; Winston-Salem, North Carolina	**L** 2–6	Cusick (1–0)	**Hurter (1–2)**	—	327	9–6	6–4	Box Score; Recap
March 20	4:00 p.m.	ACCNX	at Wake Forest	No. 11	David F. Couch Ballpark	**W** 3–1	**Archer (3–1)**	Fleming (1–2)	**Maxwell (2)**	315	10–6	6–4	Box Score; Recap
March 21	1:00 p.m.	ACCNX	at Wake Forest	No. 11	David F. Couch Ballpark	**W** 8–1	**Crawford (2–1)**	Lowder (0–1)	**Siegel (1)**	441	11–6	7–4	Box Score; Recap
March 26	7:00 p.m.	ACCN	at Duke	No. 11	Durham Bulls Athletic Park; Durham, North Carolina	**W** 5–2	**Hurter (2–2)**	Nifong (1–3)	Bartnicki (2)	0	12–6	8–4	Box Score; Recap
March 27	7:00 p.m.	ACCN	at Duke	No. 11	Durham Bulls Athletic Park	**W** 3–0	**Archer (4–1)**	Williams (2–2)	**Maxwell (3)**	0	13–6	9–4	Box Score; Recap
March 28	11:00 a.m.	ACCNX	at Duke	No. 11	Durham Bulls Athletic Park	**L** 7–9	Johnson (1–3)	**Crawford (2–2)**	Loper (3)	0	13–7	9–5	Box Score; Recap

April (7–10)
Date	Time (ET)	TV	Opponent	Rank	Stadium	Score	Win	Loss	Save	Attendance	Overall	ACC	Sources
April 1	4:00 p.m.	ACCNX	Virginia	No. 6	Russ Chandler Stadium	**W** 6–5	**Hurter (3–2)**	McGarry (0–4)	**Bartnicki (3)**	713	14–7	10–5	Box Score; Recap
April 2	7:00 p.m.	ACCNX	Virginia	No. 6	Russ Chandler Stadium	**L** 2–8	Abbott (3–4)	**Archer (4–2)**	—	713	14–8	10–6	Box Score; Recap
April 3	1:00 p.m.	ACCNX	Virginia	No. 6	Russ Chandler Stadium	**L** 4–11	Vasil (4–2)	**Crawford (2–3)**	Schoch (5)	713	14–9	10–7	Box Score; Recap
April 6	6:00 p.m.	ACCNX	USC Upstate*	No. 15	Russ Chandler Stadium	**L** 3–9	Cubbler (1–0)	**Roedig (0–2)**	Hupp (3)	713	14–10	—	Box Score; Recap
April 9	6:00 p.m.	ACCNX	at No. 13 Notre Dame	No. 15	Frank Eck Stadium; South Bend, Indiana	**L** 9–10	Sheridan (1–1)	**Maxwell (0–1)**	—	309	14–11	10–8	Box Score; Recap
April 10	4:00 p.m.	ACCNX	at No. 13 Notre Dame	No. 15	Frank Eck Stadium	**L** 0–7	Tyrell (2–1)	**Archer (4–3)**	Rao (2)	152	14–12	10–9	Box Score; Recap
April 11	1:00 p.m.	ACCNX	at No. 13 Notre Dame	No. 15	Frank Eck Stadium	**W** 4–2	**Siegel (1–0)**	Sheridan (1–2)	**Bartnicki (4)**	125	15–12	11–9	Box Score; Recap
April 13	6:00 p.m.	ACCN	Auburn*	No. 20	Russ Chandler Stadium	**L** 3–7	Bright (3–3)	**Grissom (0–1)**	—	713	15–13	—	Box Score; Recap
April 16	6:00 p.m.	ACCNX	at No. 12 Virginia Tech	No. 20	English Field; Blacksburg, Virginia	**W** 15–11	**Bartnicki (1–1)**	Heard (3–1)	—	731	16–13	12–9	Box Score; Recap
April 17	3:00 p.m.	ACCNX	at No. 12 Virginia Tech	No. 20	English Field	**L** 0–7	Simonelli (4–0)	**Crawford (2–4)**	Firoved (3)	1,000	16–14	12–10	Box Score; Recap
April 18	1:00 p.m.	ACCNX	at No. 12 Virginia Tech	No. 20	English Field	**W** 11–4	**Maxwell (1–1)**	Heard (3–2)	**Grissom (1)**	863	17–14	13–10	Box Score; Recap
April 20	6:00 p.m.	ESPN+	at Georgia State*	No. 17	GSU Baseball Complex; Decatur, Georgia	**W** 7–2	**Brown (1–0)**	Barquero (0–1)	**Huff (1)**	321	18–14	—	Box Score; Recap
April 23	7:30 p.m.	ACCNX	No. 15 Florida State	No. 17	Russ Chandler Stadium	**L** 0–9	Messick (4–2)	**Hurter (3–3)**	—	713	18–15	13–11	Box Score; Recap
April 24	4:00 p.m.	ACCNX	No. 15 Florida State	No. 17	Russ Chandler Stadium	**L** 10–13	Hubbart (5–2)	**Archer (4–4)**	Hare (3)	713	18–16	13–12	Box Score; Recap
April 25	1:00 p.m.	ACCNX	No. 15 Florida State	No. 17	Russ Chandler Stadium	**W** 9–8	**Maxwell (2–1)**	Ahearn (0–1)	**Bartnicki (5)**	713	19–16	14–12	Box Score; Recap
April 27	7:00 p.m.	SECN	at No. 20 Georgia*; Clean, Old-Fashioned Hate	No. 24	Foley Field; Athens, Georgia	**W** 7–5	**Smith (2–0)**	Bearden (3–1)	**Bartnicki (6)**	664	20–16	—	Box Score; Recap
April 30	6:00 p.m.	ACCN	Kennesaw State*	No. 24	Russ Chandler Stadium	**L** 1–5	Rice (8–0)	**Hurter (3–4)**	Rine (5)	713	20–17	—	Box Score; Recap

May (8–4)
Date	Time (ET)	TV	Opponent	Rank	Stadium	Score	Win	Loss	Save	Attendance	Overall	ACC	Sources
May 1	4:00 p.m.	ACCNX	Kennesaw State*	No. 24	Russ Chandler Stadium	**W** 13–5	**Mannelly (2–0)**	Torbert (5–3)	—	713	21–17	—	Box Score; Recap
May 2	1:00 p.m.	YouTube	at Kennesaw State*	No. 24	Fred Stillwell Stadium; Kennesaw, Georgia	**L** 5–10	Kennedy (6–0)	**Smith (2–1)**	Johnson (6)	120	21–18	—	Box Score; Recap
May 7	7:00 p.m.	ACCNX	Clemson		Russ Chandler Stadium	**W** 6–1	**Hurter (4–4)**	Anglin (2–3)	—	935	22–18	15–12	Box Score; Recap
May 8	4:00 p.m.	BSSO	Clemson		Russ Chandler Stadium	**W** 6–5	**Huff (1–0)**	Gilbert (3–5)	—	1,163	23–18	16–12	Box Score; Recap
May 9	1:00 p.m.	BSSO	Clemson		Russ Chandler Stadium	**W** 9–8	**Crawford (3–4)**	Clayton (6–2)	**Huff (2)**	1,163	24–18	17–12	Box Score; Recap
May 14	7:00 p.m.	ACCNX	at Miami (FL)	No. 25	Alex Rodriguez Park; Coral Gables, Florida	**W** 14–3	**Hurter (5–4)**	McFarlane (2–1)	—	627	25–18	18–12	Box Score; Recap
May 15	4:00 p.m.	ACCNX	at Miami (FL)	No. 25	Alex Rodriguez Park	**L** 3–10	Smith (3–0)	**Archer (4–5)**	—	641	25–19	18–13	Box Score; Recap
May 16	1:00 p.m.	ACCNX	at Miami (FL)	No. 25	Alex Rodriguez Park	**L** 4–5	Bodanza (1–0)	**Maxwell (2–2)**	Palmquist (12)	604	25–20	18–14	Box Score; Recap
May 18	6:00 p.m.	ACCNX	Georgia*; Clean, Old-Fashioned Hate		Russ Chandler Stadium	**W** 7–6 ^{(14)}	**Medich (1–0)**	Bearden (3–2)	—	1,163	26–20	—	Box Score; Recap
May 20	7:00 p.m.	ACCNX	North Carolina		Russ Chandler Stadium	**L** 2–3	Love (7–4)	**Bartnicki (1–2)**	—	1,163	26–21	18–15	Box Score; Recap
May 21	6:00 p.m.	ACCNX	North Carolina		Russ Chandler Stadium	**W** 10–9	**Bartnicki (2–2)**	Gillian (1–2)	—	1,163	27–21	19–15	Box Score; Recap
May 22	1:00 p.m.	ACCNX	North Carolina		Russ Chandler Stadium	**W** 10–6	**Grissom (1–1)**	Alba (2–4)	**Smith (1)**	1,163	28–21	20–15	Box Score; Recap

Postseason (3–4)

ACC Tournament (1–2)
Date	Time (ET)	TV	Opponent	Rank	Stadium	Score	Win	Loss	Save	Attendance	Overall	ACCT	Sources
May 26	7:00 p.m.	BSSO	vs. (11) Clemson; Pool B	No. 17 (2)	Truist Field; Charlotte, North Carolina	**L** 5–11	Sharpe (4–1)	**Smith (2–2)**	—	3,915	28–22	0–1	Box Score; Recap
May 27	3:00 p.m.	BSSE	vs. (7) Louisville; Pool B	No. 17 (2)	Truist Field	**W** 9–8 ^{(12)}	**Brown (2–0)**	Smith (3–4)	—	3,002	28–23	1–1	Box Score; Recap
May 29	5:00 p.m.	ACCN	vs. No. 16 (3) NC State; Semifinals	No. 17 (2)	Truist Field	**L** 1–8	Highfill (6–2)	**Grissom (1–2)**	Justice (9)	4,960	29–23	1–2	Box Score; Recap

NCAA Nashville Regional (2–2)
Date	Time (ET)	TV	Opponent	Rank	Stadium	Score	Win	Loss	Save	Attendance	Overall	NCAAT	Sources
June 4	12:00 p.m.	ESPN3	vs. (3) Indiana State*	No. 21 (2)	Hawkins Field; Nashville, Tennessee	**W** 7–6	**Siegel (2–0)**	Fenlong (4–3)	**Bartnicki (7)**	3,055	30–23	1–0	Box Scor; Recap
June 5	6:00 p.m.	ESPNU	at No. 4 (1) Vanderbilt*	No. 21 (2)	Hawkins Field	**L** 3–4	Leiter (9–3)	**Grissom (1–3)**	Maldonado (6)	3,294	30–24	1–1	Box Score; Recap
June 6	2:00 p.m.	ESPN3	vs. (3) Indiana State*	No. 21 (2)	Hawkins Field	**W** 9–0	**Archer (5–5)**	Cline (4–3)	—	2,775	31–24	2–1	Box Score; Recap
June 6	8:00 p.m.	ESPN3	at No. 4 (1) Vanderbilt*	No. 21 (2)	Hawkins Field	**L** 11–14 ^{(11)}	Murphy (3–1)	**Siegel (2–1)**	Maldonado (7)	3,257	31–25	2–2	Box Score; Recap

== Nashville Regional ==
Nashville Regional Teams
(1) Vanderbilt Commodores	(2) Georgia Tech Yellow Jackets	(3) Indiana State Sycamores	(4) Presbyterian Blue Hose

First round
1	Vanderbilt	10
4	Presbyterian	0
3	Indiana State	6
2	Georgia Tech	7
Lower round 1
4	Presbyterian	2
3	Indiana State	9

Semi-finals
1	Vanderbilt	4
2	Georgia Tech	3
Lower final
3	Indiana State	0
2	Georgia Tech	9

Finals
1	Vanderbilt
2	Georgia Tech

== Rankings ==
Ranking movements Legend: ██ Increase in ranking ██ Decrease in ranking — = Not ranked RV = Received votes
	Week																		
Poll	Pre	1	2	3	4	5	6	7	8	9	10	11	12	13	14	15	16	17	Final
Coaches'	13	13*	10	10	14	13	10	16	21	RV	RV	—	—	—	—	—	RV	RV	RV
Baseball America	22	21	14	7	11	10	9	15	21	20	—	—	—	—	—	—	—	—	—
Collegiate Baseball^	RV	RV	16	12	20	19	18	22	RV	RV	RV	RV	25	26	17	21	22	22	22
NCBWA†	18	17	11	13	16	12	12	18	26	30	RV	RV	RV	RV	RV	RV	RV	RV	RV
D1Baseball	15	15	12	7	12	11	6	15	—	—	—	—	—	—	—	—	—	—	—

^ Collegiate Baseball ranked 40 teams in their preseason poll, but only ranked 30 teams weekly during the season.
† NCBWA ranks 30 teams in their preseason poll, but only ranks 25 teams weekly during the season.
* A new poll was not released for this week, so for comparison purposes, the previous week's ranking is inserted in this week's slot.

== 2021 MLB draft ==
Player	Position	Round	Overall	MLB team
Luke Waddell	SS	5	157	Atlanta Braves
Justyn-Henry Malloy	1B	6	187	Atlanta Braves
Brant Hurter	LHP	7	195	Detroit Tigers
