= 2021 Notre Dame Fighting Irish baseball team =

Baseball team season

2021 Notre Dame Fighting Irish baseball

ACC regular season champions ACC Atlantic Division champions South Bend Regional champions
- Conference: Atlantic Coast Conference

Ranking
- Coaches: No. 6
- CB: No. 15
- Record: 34–13 (25–10 ACC)
- Head coach: Link Jarrett (2nd season)
- Assistant coaches: Rich Wallace (2nd season); Chuck Ristano (11th season); Scott Wingo (2nd season)
- Home stadium: Frank Eck Stadium

2021 Atlantic Coast Conference baseball standings
	Conf.				Overall
Team	W		L	PCT	W		L	PCT
Atlantic
No. 10 Notre Dame ^{x}‍‍‍^{y}	25	–	10	.714	34	–	13	.723
No. 4 NC State ‍‍‍^{y}	19	–	14	.576	37	–	19	.661
Florida State ‍‍‍^{y}	20	–	16	.556	31	–	24	.564
Louisville ‍‍‍	16	–	16	.500	28	–	22	.560
Clemson ‍‍‍	16	–	20	.444	25	–	27	.481
Wake Forest ‍‍‍	10	–	22	.313	20	–	27	.426
Boston College ‍‍‍	10	–	23	.303	21	–	28	.429
Coastal
Georgia Tech ^{x}‍‍‍^{y}	21	–	15	.583	31	–	25	.554
Miami (FL) ‍‍‍^{y}	20	–	15	.571	33	–	21	.611
Virginia ‍‍‍^{y}	18	–	18	.500	36	–	27	.571
North Carolina ‍‍‍^{y}	18	–	18	.500	28	–	27	.509
Duke ‍‍‡‍^{y}	16	–	17	.485	33	–	22	.600
Pittsburgh ‍‍‍	16	–	17	.485	23	–	20	.535
Virginia Tech ‍‍‍	16	–	20	.444	27	–	25	.519
x – Division champion ‡ – Tournament champion y – Invited to the NCAA tournament As of July 1, 2021; Rankings from D1Baseball

The 2021 Notre Dame Fighting Irish baseball team represented the University of Notre Dame during the 2021 NCAA Division I baseball season. The Irish played their home games at Frank Eck Stadium as a member of the Atlantic Coast Conference. They were led by head coach Link Jarrett, in his 2nd season at Notre Dame.

== Previous season ==
The 2020 Notre Dame Fighting Irish baseball team notched a 11–2 (3–0) regular season record. The season prematurely ended on March 12, 2020, due to concerns over the COVID-19 pandemic.

== 2021 season ==
During the 2021 regular season, Notre Dame finished with a record of 30–11 (25–10 in conference play) and won the ACC Atlantic Division. Notre Dame was selected to host regionals for the first time since 2004. Michigan, UConn, and Central Michigan were all placed in the South Bend regional with Notre Dame. The Irish won the regional with a final record of 3–0. On June 5, the Irish beat UConn in their second-round regional game by a score of 26–3. It was the record for the most runs scored during a playoff game in program history. The Irish advanced to the Starkville Super Regional, where they lost to Mississippi State.

Niko Kavadas set a program single-season home run record with 21, breaking Frank Jacobs' 1991 total.

== Personnel ==
=== Roster ===
2021 Notre Dame Fighting Irish roster
Pitchers: 32 – Matt Bedford – Freshman; 28 – John Michael Bertrand – Graduate Student; 26 – Cameron Brown – Graduate Student; 55 – Dominic Cancellieri – Sophomore; 41 – Jackson Dennies – Freshman; 36 – James Hulbert – Graduate Student; 20 – Tanner Kohlhepp – Sophomore; 25 – Ryan Lynch – Freshman; 30 – Mitch Megias – Junior; 43 – Will Mercer – Junior; 27 – Gerry Peacock – Sophomore; 45 – Alex Rao – Junior; 22 – Christian Scafidi – Graduate Student; 23 – Jack Sheehan – Graduate Student; 37 – Joe Sheridan – Graduate Student; 29 – Liam Simon – Sophomore; 17 – Aidan Tyrell – Junior	Catchers: 24 – Alex Brait – Graduate Student; 18 – Nick Juaire – Redshirt Freshman; 3 – David LaManna – Senior; 47 – Tony Lindwedel – Freshman; 8 – Danny Neri – Freshman; Infielders: 9 – Jack Brannigan – Sophomore; 13 – Drew Byers – Freshman; 38 – Kyle Hess – Sophomore; 12 – Niko Kavadas – Senior; 19 – Casey Kmet – Sophomore; 16 – Jared Miller – Senior; 15 – Brock Murtha – Freshman; 14 – Zack Prajzner – Junior; 4 – Carter Putz – Junior	Outfielders: 42 – Brooks Coetzee – Junior; 1 – Ryan Cole – Senior; 50 – Sammy Cooper – Freshman; 21 – Brady Gumpf – Freshman; 31 – Daniel Jung – Graduate Student; 2 – Spencer Myers – Senior; 52 – Tony Watson – Freshman; 6 – TJ Williams – Freshman; 7 – Jack Zyska – Junior

=== Coaching staff ===
Name	Position	Seasons at Notre Dame	Alma mater
Link Jarrett	Head coach	2	Florida State University (1994)
Rich Wallace	Assistant Coach	2	University of Central Florida (2004)
Chuck Ristano	Assistant Coach	11	Sacred Heart University (2004)
Scott Wingo	Volunteer Assistant Coach	2	University of South Carolina (2011)

== Game log ==
2021 Notre Dame Fighting Irish baseball game log
Regular season
February

Date	Opponent	Rank	Site/stadium	Score	Win	Loss	Save	Attendance	Overall record	ACC record
February 27	at Wake Forest		David F. Couch Ballpark • Winston-Salem, NC	8–10	Cole McNamee (1–0)	Tanner Kohlhepp (0–1)	Camden Minacci (2)	233	0–1	0–1
February 27	at Wake Forest		David F. Couch Ballpark • Winston-Salem, NC	5–4	Liam Simon (1–0)	Crawford Wade (0–1)	Aidan Tyrell (1)	278	1–1	1–1
February 28	at Wake Forest		David F. Couch Ballpark • Winston-Salem, NC	10–0	Christian Scafidi (1–0)	Shane Smith (0–1)	Alex Rao (1)	401	2–1	2–1

March

Date	Opponent	Rank	Site/stadium	Score	Win	Loss	Save	Attendance	Overall record	ACC record
March 5	at Clemson		Doug Kingsmore Stadium • Clemson, SC	7–13	Davis Sharpe (2–0)	Tommy Sheehan (0–1)		1,280	2–2	2–2
March 6	at Clemson		Doug Kingsmore Stadium • Clemson, SC	3–1	John Michael Bertrand (1–0)	Ty Olenchuk (1–1)	Will Mercer (1)	1,280	3–2	3–2
March 7	at Clemson		Doug Kingsmore Stadium • Clemson, SC	3–2	Liam Simon (2–0)	Mack Anglin (0–1)	Jack Brannigan (1)	1,280	4–2	4–2
March 12	at Virginia		Davenport Field • Charlottesville, VA	10–5	Liam Simon (3–0)	Andrew Abbott (1–3)	Joe Sheridan (1)	221	5–2	5–2
March 13	at Virginia		Davenport Field • Charlottesville, VA	12–4	John Michael Bertrand (2–0)	Paul Kosanovich (0–1)		354	6–2	6–2
March 14	at Virginia		Davenport Field • Charlottesville, VA	8–3	Aidan Tyrell (1–0)	Mike Vasil (3–1)	Tanner Kohlhepp (1)	350	7–2	7–2
March 19	Duke	No. 23	Frank Eck Stadium • Notre Dame, IN	6–4 ^{(13)}	Tanner Kohlhepp (1–1)	Matt Dockman (0–1)		210	8–2	8–2
March 20	Duke	No. 23	Frank Eck Stadium • Notre Dame, IN	6–2	John Michael Bertrand (3–0)	Henry Williams (2–1)		275	9–2	9–2
March 21	Duke	No. 23	Frank Eck Stadium • Notre Dame, IN	0–2	Jack Carey (1–0)	Aidan Tyrell (1–1)	Marcus Johnson (2)	300	9–3	9–3
March 23	Valparaiso	No. 21	Frank Eck Stadium • Notre Dame, IN	6–3	Will Mercer (1–0)	Easton Rhodehouse (1–1)	Liam Simon (1)	75	10–3	
March 26	No. 7 Louisville	No. 21	Frank Eck Stadium • Notre Dame, IN	4–7	Adam Elliott (3–1)	Joe Sheridan (0–1)	Kaleb Corbett (4)	301	10–4	9–4
March 27	No. 7 Louisville	No. 21	Frank Eck Stadium • Notre Dame, IN	5–3	Jack Brannigan (1–0)	Tate Kuehner (1–3)		315	11–4	10–4

April

Date	Opponent	Rank	Site/stadium	Score	Win	Loss	Save	Attendance	Overall record	ACC record
April 3	at Pittsburgh	No. 17	Charles L. Cost Field • Pittsburgh, PA	4–1	Tanner Kohlhepp (2–1)	Mitch Myers (2–4)	Joe Sheridan (2)	55	12–4	11–4
April 4	at Pittsburgh	No. 17	Charles L. Cost Field • Pittsburgh, PA	2–3	Jordan McCrum (2–1)	Liam Simon (3–1)		210	12–5	11–5
April 5	at Pittsburgh	No. 19	Charles L. Cost Field • Pittsburgh, PA	11–5	Tanner Kohlhepp (3–1)	Stephen Hansen (1–1)		210	13–5	12–5
April 9	No. 22 Georgia Tech	No. 19	Frank Eck Stadium • Notre Dame, IN	10–9	Joe Sheridan (1–1)	Zach Maxwell (0–1)		309	14–5	13–5
April 10	No. 22 Georgia Tech	No. 19	Frank Eck Stadium • Notre Dame, IN	7–0	Aidan Tyrell (2–1)	Andy Archer (4–3)	Alex Rao (2)	152	15–5	14–5
April 11	No. 22 Georgia Tech	No. 19	Frank Eck Stadium • Notre Dame, IN	2–4	Josiah Siegel (1–0)	Joe Sheridan (1–2)	Luke Bartnicki (4)	125	15–6	14–6
April 13	Central Michigan	No. 16	Frank Eck Stadium • Notre Dame, IN	8–4	Alex Rao (1–0)	J.T. Rogoszewski (1–2)		116	16–6	
April 16	NC State	No. 16	Frank Eck Stadium • Notre Dame, IN	3–2	Tanner Kohlhepp (4–1)	Reid Johnston (3–2)		279	17–6	15–6
April 17	NC State	No. 16	Frank Eck Stadium • Notre Dame, IN	2–5	Sam Highfill (3–2)	John Michael Bertrand (3–1)	Evan Justice (2)	237	17–7	15–7
April 18	NC State	No. 16	Frank Eck Stadium • Notre Dame, IN	11–2	Tanner Kohlhepp (5–1)	Matt Willadsen (3–1)	Joe Sheridan (3)	188	18–7	16–7
April 23	at Boston College	No. 14	Pellagrini Diamond • Chestnut Hill, MA	0–10	Emmett Sheehan (4–3)	Will Mercer (1–1)		150	18–8	16–8
April 24	at Boston College	No. 14	Pellagrini Diamond • Chestnut Hill, MA	5–2	John Michael Bertrand (4–1)	Mason Pelio (3–5)	Tanner Kohlhepp (2)	150	19–8	17–8
April 24	at Boston College	No. 14	Pellagrini Diamond • Chestnut Hill, MA	13–9	Liam Simon (4–1)	Charlie Coon (1–2)		150	20–8	18–8
April 27	Valparaiso	No. 14	Frank Eck Stadium • Notre Dame, IN	8–7	Liam Simon (5–1)	Nathan Chasey (0–2)		97	21–8	
April 30	North Carolina	No. 14	Frank Eck Stadium • Notre Dame, IN	4–0	Tanner Kohlhepp (6–1)	Austin Love (5–4)		175	22–8	19–8

May

Date	Opponent	Rank	Site/stadium	Score	Win	Loss	Save	Attendance	Overall record	ACC record
May 1	North Carolina	No. 14	Frank Eck Stadium • Notre Dame, IN	13–12	John Michael Bertrand (5–1)	Shawn Rapp (1–1)	Aidan Tyrell (2)	274	23–8	20–8
May 2	North Carolina	No. 14	Frank Eck Stadium • Notre Dame, IN	19–5	Tanner Kohlhepp (7–1)	Gage Gillian (1–1)		275	24–8	21–8
May 7	Florida State	No. 10	Frank Eck Stadium • Notre Dame, IN	2–5	Parker Messick (6–2)	Will Mercer (1–2)	Jack Anderson (3)	358	24–9	21–9
May 8	Florida State	No. 10	Frank Eck Stadium • Notre Dame, IN	5–3	John Michael Bertrand (6–1)	Bryce Hubbart (5–4)	Jack Brannigan (2)	302	25–9	22–9
May 8	Florida State	No. 10	Frank Eck Stadium • Notre Dame, IN	1–7	Conor Grady (5–2)	Alex Rao (1–1)		302	25–10	22–10
May 11	at Valparaiso	No. 15	Emory G. Bauer Field • Valparaiso, IN	7–4	Will Mercer (2–2)	Easton Rhodehouse (3–3)		70	26–10	
May 20	at Virginia Tech	No. 13	English Field • Blacksburg, VA	8–2	John Michael Bertrand (7–1)	Peyton Alford (2–5)		448	27–10	23–10
May 21	at Virginia Tech	No. 13	English Field • Blacksburg, VA	4–0	Aidan Tyrell (3–1)	Anthony Simonelli (5–2)	Jack Brannigan (3)	664	28–10	24–10
May 22	at Virginia Tech	No. 13	English Field • Blacksburg, VA	7–1	Alex Rao (2–1)	Ryan Okuda (2–3)	Will Mercer (2)	619	29–10	25–10

Postseason
ACC Tournament

Date	Opponent	Rank	Site/stadium	Score	Win	Loss	Save	Attendance	Overall record	ACCT record
May 26	vs. Virginia Tech	No. 7	Truist Field • Charlotte, NC	8–0	Will Mercer (3–2)	Jaison Heard (3–4)		3,020	30–10	1–0
May 28	vs. Virginia	No. 7	Truist Field • Charlotte, NC	1–14	Andrew Abbott (8–5)	John Michael Bertrand (7–2)			30–11	1–1

NCAA tournament: South Bend Regional

Date	Opponent	Rank	Site/stadium	Score	Win	Loss	Save	Attendance	Overall record	NCAAT record
June 4	vs. No. 26 Central Michigan	No. 7	Frank Eck Stadium • Notre Dame, IN	10–0	John Michael Bertrand (8–2)	Andrew Taylor (11–4)		1,825	31–11	1–0

All rankings from Collegiate Baseball.

== South Bend Regional ==
South Bend Regional Teams
(1) Notre Dame Fighting Irish	(2) UConn Huskies	(3) Michigan Wolverines	(4) Central Michigan Chippewas

First round
1	Notre Dame	10
4	Central Michigan	0
3	Michigan	1
2	UConn	6
Lower round 1
4	Central Michigan	8
3	Michigan	2

Regional semifinals
1	Notre Dame	26
2	UConn	3
Lower final
2	UConn	9
4	Central Michigan	14

Regional final
1	Notre Dame
4	Central Michigan

== Starkville Super Regional ==
Starkville Super Regional Game 1
(10) Notre Dame Fighting Irish	vs.	(7) Mississippi State Bulldogs

June 12, 2021, 2:00 pm (EDT) at Dudy Noble Field in Starkville, Mississippi
Team	1	2	3	4	5	6	7	8	9	R	H	E
(10) Notre Dame	1	1	1	1	3	0	1	0	0	8	12	4
(7) Mississippi State	1	0	2	0	3	2	1	0	x	9	10	1
WP: Preston Johnson (3–0) LP: Tanner Kohlhepp (7–2) Sv: Landon Sims (10); Home runs: ND: Brooks Coetzee (6), Zack Prajzner (6); MSU: Tanner Allen (9), Rowdey Jordan (10), Logan Tanner (13); Attendance: 14,385

Starkville Super Regional Game 2
(7) Mississippi State Bulldogs	vs.	(10) Notre Dame Fighting Irish

June 13, 2021, 6:00 pm (EDT) at Dudy Noble Field in Starkville, Mississippi
Team
(7) Mississippi State
(10) Notre Dame
