= Tom Walter =

American college baseball coach

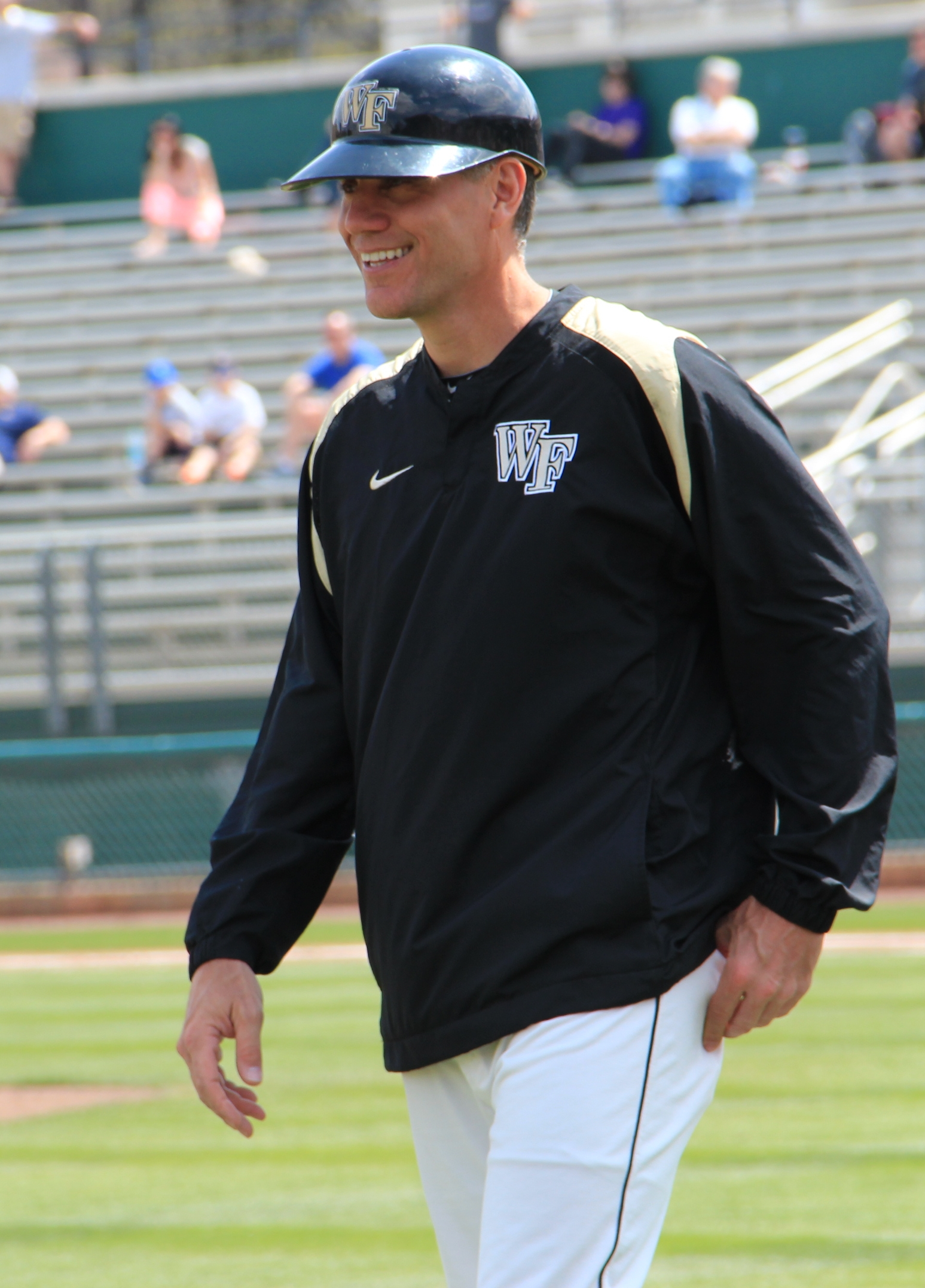
- Walter in 2013

Current position
- Title: Head Coach
- Team: Wake Forest
- Conference: ACC
- Record: 534–404–1 (.569)

Biographical details
- Born: Johnstown, Pennsylvania, U.S.
- Education: Georgetown University bachelor’s degree in finance George Washington University School of Business MBA 1994

Playing career
- 1988–1991: Georgetown
- Positions: C, OF

Coaching career (HC unless noted)
- 1992–1994: George Washington (Asst.)
- 1994: New Market Rebels
- 1997–1998: Cotuit Kettleers
- 1997–2004: George Washington
- 2005–2009: New Orleans
- 2010–present: Wake Forest

Administrative career (AD unless noted)
- 1995–1996: Greensboro Bats (Asst. GM)

Head coaching record
- Overall: 960–732–1 (.567)

Accomplishments and honors

Championships
- NCAA Super Regional (2023); 2x NCAA Regional (2017, 2023); ACC Regular Season Title (2024); ACC Atlantic Division Title (2024); 3x Atlantic 10 Western Division Titles (1998, 2000, 2004); Atlantic 10 Tournament championship (2002); Sun Belt Tournament championship (2007); 8x NCAA Regional Appearances (2002, 2007, 2008, 2016, 2017, 2022–2024)

Awards
- ACC Coach of the Year (2023)

Tom Walter is an American college baseball coach. He has been the head coach of Wake Forest since the start of the 2010 season. Before coming to Wake Forest, Walter held head coaching positions at George Washington from 1997–2004 and New Orleans from 2005–2009. He was an assistant at George Washington from 1992–1994. Walter's career head coaching record, as of the end of the 2014 season, is 560–473.

Outside NCAA baseball, Walter served as the assistant general manager of the minor league Greensboro Bats from 1995–1996. In collegiate summer baseball, Walter was the head coach of the Valley Baseball League's New Market Rebels in 1994 and the Cape Cod League's Cotuit Kettleers from 1997–1998.

Walter received national media attention prior to the 2011 season for donating his kidney to Wake Forest baseball player Kevin Jordan. In his senior year of high school, Jordan had developed ANCA vasculitis, a condition that severely affected his kidneys. After Jordan enrolled at Wake Forest in fall 2010, the condition did not improve, and by January 2011 he required a kidney transplant. Since none of Jordan's family members qualified as a donor, Walter offered to be a kidney donor for Jordan. The February 2011 operation was successful, and Jordan was able to start his baseball career for Wake Forest in spring 2012.

On June 2, 2025, while coaching a game against The University of Tennessee, Walter appeared to call an opposing player a "fucking faggot." He later apologized for his "outburst in frustration."

== Head coaching record ==
Below is a table of Walter's yearly records as an NCAA head baseball coach.

Record table
Season	Team	Overall	Conference	Standing	Postseason
George Washington (Atlantic 10 Conference) (1997–2004)
1997	George Washington	21–33	9–12	5th (Western)	
1998	George Washington	33–18	13–2	1st (Western)	
1999	George Washington	26–30	10–11	T–2nd (Western)	
2000	George Washington	37–21	16–5	T–1st (Western)	
2001	George Washington	38–23	13–9	4th	
2002	George Washington	42–23	17–7	2nd (Western)	NCAA Regional
2003	George Washington	35–15	12–9	4th (Western)	
2004	George Washington	41–18	19–5	1st (Western)	
George Washington:		273–181 (.601)	109–60 (.645)		
New Orleans (Sun Belt Conference) (2005–2009)
2005	New Orleans	20–39	10–14	7th	
2006	New Orleans	30–28	12–12	5th	
2007	New Orleans	38–26	16–14	T–2nd	NCAA Regional
2008	New Orleans	43–21	18–11	2nd	NCAA Regional
2009	New Orleans	22–33	12–18	T–9th	
New Orleans:		153–147 (.510)	68–69 (.496)		
Wake Forest (Atlantic Coast Conference) (2010–present)
2010	Wake Forest	18–37	8–22	5th (Atlantic)	
2011	Wake Forest	25–31	15–15	T–3rd (Atlantic)	
2012	Wake Forest	33–24	13–17	4th (Atlantic)	
2013	Wake Forest	28–27	9–20	5th (Atlantic)	
2014	Wake Forest	30–26	15–15	4th (Atlantic)	
2015	Wake Forest	27–26	12–18	6th (Atlantic)	
2016	Wake Forest	35–27	13–17	6th (Atlantic)	NCAA Regional
2017	Wake Forest	42–18	19–11	2nd (Atlantic)	NCAA Super Regional
2018	Wake Forest	25–32	13–17	5th (Atlantic)	
2019	Wake Forest	31–26	14–16	5th (Atlantic)	
2020	Wake Forest	9–7	1–2	(Atlantic)	Season canceled due to COVID-19
2021	Wake Forest	20–27	10–22	6th (Atlantic)	ACC tournament
2022	Wake Forest	41–19–1	15–14–1	3rd (Atlantic)	NCAA Regional
2023	Wake Forest	54–12	22–7	1st (Atlantic)	College World Series
2024	Wake Forest	38–22	15–15	5th (Atlantic)	NCAA regional
2025	Wake Forest	39–22	16–14	8th	NCAA regional
2026	Wake Forest	39–21	16–14	T–5th	NCAA Regional
Wake Forest:		534–404–1 (.569)	226–256–1 (.469)		
Total:		960–732–1 (.567)			
National champion Postseason invitational champion Conference regular season champion Conference regular season and conference tournament champion Division regular season champion Division regular season and conference tournament champion Conference tournament champion

== See also ==
- List of current NCAA Division I baseball coaches
