= 2021 Louisville Cardinals baseball team =

American college baseball season

2021 Louisville Cardinals baseball
- Conference: Atlantic Coast Conference
- Record: 28–22 (16–16 ACC)
- Head coach: Dan McDonnell (15th season)
- Assistant coaches: Roger Williams (15th season); Eric Snider (7th season); Adam Vrable (7th season)
- Home stadium: Jim Patterson Stadium

2021 Atlantic Coast Conference baseball standings
	Conf.				Overall
Team	W		L	PCT	W		L	PCT
Atlantic
No. 10 Notre Dame ^{x}‍‍‍^{y}	25	–	10	.714	34	–	13	.723
No. 4 NC State ‍‍‍^{y}	19	–	14	.576	37	–	19	.661
Florida State ‍‍‍^{y}	20	–	16	.556	31	–	24	.564
Louisville ‍‍‍	16	–	16	.500	28	–	22	.560
Clemson ‍‍‍	16	–	20	.444	25	–	27	.481
Wake Forest ‍‍‍	10	–	22	.313	20	–	27	.426
Boston College ‍‍‍	10	–	23	.303	21	–	28	.429
Coastal
Georgia Tech ^{x}‍‍‍^{y}	21	–	15	.583	31	–	25	.554
Miami (FL) ‍‍‍^{y}	20	–	15	.571	33	–	21	.611
Virginia ‍‍‍^{y}	18	–	18	.500	36	–	27	.571
North Carolina ‍‍‍^{y}	18	–	18	.500	28	–	27	.509
Duke ‍‍‡‍^{y}	16	–	17	.485	33	–	22	.600
Pittsburgh ‍‍‍	16	–	17	.485	23	–	20	.535
Virginia Tech ‍‍‍	16	–	20	.444	27	–	25	.519
x – Division champion ‡ – Tournament champion y – Invited to the NCAA tournament As of July 1, 2021; Rankings from D1Baseball

The 2021 Louisville Cardinals baseball team represented the University of Louisville during the 2021 NCAA Division I baseball season. The Cardinals played their home games at Jim Patterson Stadium as a member of the Atlantic Coast Conference. They were led by head coach Dan McDonnell, in his 15th season at Louisville.

With a record of 28–22, the Cardinals missed the NCAA Tournament for the first time since 2011. Four potential resume building games were cancelled. The series finale against Notre Dame was postponed and then cancelled due to weather and then a three-game series against Pittsburgh was cancelled due to COVID-19.

== Previous season ==
The 2020 Louisville Cardinals baseball team notched a 13–4 (2–1) regular season record. The season prematurely ended on March 12, 2020, due to concerns over the COVID-19 pandemic.

=== 2020 MLB draft ===
The Cardinals had three players drafted in the 2020 MLB draft.

Player	Position	Round	Overall	MLB Team
Reid Detmers	Pitcher	1	10	Los Angeles Angels
Bobby Miller	Pitcher	1	29	Los Angeles Dodgers
Zach Britton	Outfielder	5	136	Toronto Blue Jays

== Personnel ==
=== Roster ===
2020 Louisville Cardinals roster
Pitchers: 4 – Adam Elliott – Senior; 15 – Alex Galvan – Freshman; 17 – Shane Harris – Freshman; 19 – Ryan Hawks – Freshman; 26 – Kerry Wright – Sophomore; 27 – Evan Webster – Freshman; 28 – Kellan Tulio – Freshman; 30 – Michael Prosecky – Freshman; 31 – Carter Lohman – Sophomore; 33 – Michael Kirian – Junior; 34 – Ben Wiegman – Freshman; 35 – Garrett Schmeltz – Sophomore; 36 – Glenn Albanese – Junior; 39 – Jack Perkins – Sophomore; 40 – Tate Kuehner – Freshman; 41 – Riley Phillips – Freshman; 43 – Duncan Hall – Freshman; 44 – Gavin Sullivan – Junior; 45 – Luke Smith – Senior; 48 – J.R. Langworthy – Sophomore; 54 – Kaleb Corbett – Freshman; 55 – Seamus Barrett – Freshman; 56 – Trevor Amburgey – Freshman	Catchers: 22 – Ben Metzinger – Sophomore; 32 – Henry Davis – Sophomore; 46 – Jack Payton – Freshman; Infielders: 2 – Cooper Bowman – Sophomore; 9 – Christian Knapczyk – Freshman; 10 – Tim Borden II – Sophomore; 13 – Alex Binelas – Sophomore; 16 – Justin Lavey – Senior; 18 – Wyatt Stevenson – Freshman; 47 – Drake Wescott – Freshman	Outfielders: 5 – Levi Usher – Sophomore; 8 – Luke Brown – Junior; 11 – Chris Seng – Sophomore; 14 – Trey Leonard – Junior; 29 – Tyeler Hawkins – Freshman; 51 – Isaac Humphrey – Freshman; 52 – JT Benson – Freshman; Utility: 6 – Ben Bianco (C/1B) – Junior; 7 – Lucas Dunn (INF/OF) – Junior; 20 – Dalton Rushing (C/1B) – Freshman; 24 – Cameron Masterman (INF/OF) – Junior; 25 – Jared Poland (INF/P) – Sophomore

=== Coaching staff ===
2020 louisville cardinals coaching staff
Name	Position	Seasons at Louisville	Alma mater
Dan McDonnell	Head coach	15	The Citadel (1992)
Roger Williams	Associate head coach/Pitching	15	East Carolina (1997)
Eric Snider	Assistant Coach/recruiting coordinator	7	Northern Iowa (1987)
Adam Vrable	Assistant Coach	7	Coastal Carolina (2007)
Brian Mundorf	Director of Operations	26	American International (1992)

== Game log ==
2021 Louisville Cardinals baseball game log
Legend: = Win = Loss = Canceled Bold = Louisville team member * Non-conference game
Regular season (27–21)

February (6–1)
Date	Time (ET)	TV	Opponent	Rank	Stadium	Score	Win	Loss	Save	Attendance	Overall	ACC	Sources
February 20	1:00 p.m.	ACCNX	Bellarmine*	No. 5	Jim Patterson Stadium; Louisville, Kentucky	**W** 5–1	**Albanese** (1–0)	Barringer (0–1)		210	1–0	–	
February 21	12:00 p.m.	ACCNX	Bellarmine*	No. 5	Jim Patterson Stadium	**W** 13–1	**Elliott** (1–0)	Miley (0–1)			2–0	–	
February 21	3:30 p.m.	ACCNX	Bellarmine*	No. 5	Jim Patterson Stadium	**W** 8–3	**Smith** (1–0)	Davis (0–1)		188	3–0	–	
February 23	3:00 p.m.	ACCNX	Eastern Kentucky*	No. 4	Jim Patterson Stadium	**W** 6–2	**Corbett** (1–0)	Kelly (1–1)		445	4–0	–	
February 26	1:00 p.m.	ACCNX	Western Illinois*	No. 4	Jim Patterson Stadium	**L** 3–8	Sears (1–0)	**Kuehner** (0–1)	Raymond (1)	255	4–1	–	
February 27	1:00 p.m.	ACCNX	Western Illinois*	No. 4	Jim Patterson Stadium	**W** 4–1	**Kirian** (1–0)	Warkentien (0–1)	**Perkins** (1)		5–1	–	
February 27	4:30 p.m.	ACCNX	Western Illinois*	No. 4	Jim Patterson Stadium	**W** 9–4	**Smith** (2–0)	Fochs (0–1)	**Corbett** (1)		6–1	–	

March (11–5)
Date	Time (ET)	TV	Opponent	Rank	Stadium	Score	Win	Loss	Save	Attendance	Overall	ACC	Sources
March 2	3:30 p.m.	ACCNX	Morehead State*	No. 5	Jim Patterson Stadium	**L** 2–5	Herron (1–0)	**Lohman** (0–1)		312	6–2	–	
March 5	4:00 p.m.	ACCNX	at No. 12 Georgia Tech	No. 5	Russ Chandler Stadium; Atlanta, Georgia	**W** 13–6	**Kirian** (2–0)	Hurter (1–1)		713	7–2	1–0	
March 6	2:00 p.m.	ACCNX	at No. 12 Georgia Tech	No. 5	Russ Chandler Stadium	**L** 6–19	Archer (1–1)	**Elliott** (1–1)			7–3	1–1	
March 7	3:00 p.m.	ACCN	at No. 12 Georgia Tech	No. 5	Russ Chandler Stadium	**L** 9–13	Finley (2–0)	**Smith** (2–1)		713	7–4	1–2	
March 9	3:00 p.m.	ACCNX	Morehead State*	No. 10	Jim Patterson Stadium	**W** 8–3	**Kuehner** (1–1)	Vernon (0–1)		606	8–4	–	
March 12	6:00 p.m.	ACCNX	No. 22 Boston College	No. 10	Jim Patterson Stadium	**W** 7–3	**Kirian** (3–0)	Pelio (2–2)	**Elliott** (1)	880	9–4	2–2	
March 13	1:00 p.m.	ACCNX	No. 22 Boston College	No. 10	Jim Patterson Stadium	**W** 5–0	**Albanese** (2–0)	Sheehan (2–2)		880	10–4	3–2	
March 14	1:00 p.m.	ACCNX	No. 22 Boston College	No. 10	Jim Patterson Stadium	**W** 8–6	**Perkins** (1–0)	Gieg (0–1)	**Corbett** (2)	880	11–4	4–2	
March 16	5:00 p.m.	ESPN+	at Eastern Kentucky*	No. 8	Turkey Hughes Field; Richmond, Kentucky	**L** 3–6	Travis (1–0)	**Kuehner** (1–2)	Brian (4)	270	11–5	–	
March 19	6:30 p.m.	ACCNX	at NC State	No. 8	Doak Field; Raleigh, North Carolina	**W** 13–1	**Kirian** (4–0)	Justice (1–2)		346	12–5	5–2	
March 20	2:00 p.m.	ACCNX	at NC State	No. 8	Doak Field	**W** 6–3	**Albanese** (3–0)	Highfill (0–1)	**Corbett** (3)	353	13–5	6–2	
March 21	11:00 a.m.	ACCNX	at NC State	No. 8	Doak Field	**W** 8–3	**Elliott** (2–1)	Feeney (0–1)		304	14–5	7–2	
March 23	6:00 p.m.	ACCNX	Western Kentucky*	No. 7	Jim Patterson Stadium	**W** 13–6	**Barrett** (1–0)	Shiflet (0–2)		548	15–5	–	
March 26	4:00 p.m.	ACCNX	at No. 14 Notre Dame	No. 7	Frank Eck Stadium; South Bend, Indiana	**W** 7–4	**Elliott** (3–1)	Sheridan (0–1)	**Corbett** (4)	301	16–5	8–2	
March 27	2:00 p.m.	ACCNX	at No. 14 Notre Dame	No. 7	Frank Eck Stadium	**L** 3–5	Brannigan (1–0)	**Kuehner** (1–3)		315	16–6	8–3	
March 28	1:00 p.m.	ACCNX	at No. 14 Notre Dame	No. 7	Frank Eck Stadium	–	(–)	(–)			–	–	
March 30	6:00 p.m.	ESPN+	at Cincinnati*	No. 7	UC Baseball Stadium; Cincinnati, Ohio	**L** 12–13	Keathley (1–0)	**Corbett** (1–1)		815	16–7	–	

April (7–5)
Date	Time (ET)	TV	Opponent	Rank	Stadium	Score	Win	Loss	Save	Attendance	Overall	ACC	Sources
April 2	6:00 p.m.	ACCN	Wake Forest	No. 7	Jim Patterson Stadium	**W** 5–3	**Kirian** (5–0)	Cusick (1–1)	**Elliott** (2)	880	17–7	9–3	
April 3	1:00 p.m.	ACCN	Wake Forest	No. 7	Jim Patterson Stadium	**W** 9–7	**Elliott** (4–1)	Minacci (0–1)		880	18–7	10–3	
April 4	12:30 p.m.	ESPN2	Wake Forest	No. 7	Jim Patterson Stadium	**L** 3–6	Lowder (1–1)	**Smith** (2–2)	Adler (5)	880	18–8	10–4	
April 6	6:00 p.m.	ACCN	Kentucky	No. 7	Jim Patterson Stadium	**L** 7–11	Harney (2–0)	**Perkins** (1–1)	Rigsby (1)	880	18–9	–	
April 9	6:00 p.m.	ACCN	No. 17 Florida State	No. 7	Jim Patterson Stadium	**W** 4–3^{10}	**Elliott** (5–1)	Scolaro (0–1)		880	19–9	11–4	
April 10	5:00 p.m.	ACCN	No. 17 Florida State	No. 7	Jim Patterson Stadium	**L** 5–8	Anderson (1–0)	**Albanese** (3–1)		880	19–10	11–5	
April 11	4:00 p.m.	ESPN2	No. 17 Florida State	No. 7	Jim Patterson Stadium	**W** 11–4	**Kuehner** (2–3)	Scolaro (0–2)		880	20–10	12–5	
April 16	6:00 p.m.	ACCN	at Virginia	No. 7	Davenport Field; Charlottesville, VA	**L** 7–8^{10}	Schoch (1–0)	**Elliott** (5–2)		477	20–11	12–6	
April 17	4:00 p.m.	ACCN	at Virginia	No. 7	Davenport Field	**W** 9–5	**Kuehner** (3–3)	Vasil (5–3)		522	21–11	13–6	
April 18	1:00 p.m.	ACCN	at Virginia	No. 7	Davenport Field	**W** 8–2	**Smith** (3–2)	Savino (1–2)		522	22–11	14–6	
April 20	5:00 p.m.	ESPNU	at Kentucky	No. 7	Kentucky Proud Park; Lexington, KY	**W** 12–5	**Lohman** (1–1)	Kammin (1–1)		1,730	23–11	–	
April 23	3:00 p.m.	ACCN	Pittsburgh	No. 7	Jim Patterson Stadium	–	(–)	(–)			–	–	
April 24	1:00 p.m.	ACCN	Pittsburgh	No. 7	Jim Patterson Stadium	–	(–)	(–)			–	–	
April 25	1:00 p.m.	ACCN	Pittsburgh	No. 7	Jim Patterson Stadium	–	(–)	(–)			–	–	
April 30	6:00 p.m.	ACCN	at Clemson	No. 7	Doug Kingsmore Stadium; Clemson, SC	**L** 3–11	Anglin (2–2)	**Kirian** (5–1)		1,782	23–12	14–7	

May (4–9)
Date	Time (ET)	TV	Opponent	Rank	Stadium	Score	Win	Loss	Save	Attendance	Overall	ACC	Sources
May 1	3:00 p.m.	ACCN	at Clemson	No. 7	Doug Kingsmore Stadium	**L** 4–5	Gilbert (3–4)	**Kuehner** (3–4)	Hoffmann (2)	1,912	23–13	14–8	
May 2	2:00 p.m.	ESPNU	at Clemson	No. 7	Doug Kingsmore Stadium	**L** 5–15	Hughes (1–0)	**Smith** (3–3)		1,873	23–14	14–9	
May 4	4:00 p.m.	ESPNU	No. 2 Vanderbilt	No. 15	Jim Patterson Stadium	**W** 7–2	**Lohman** (2–1)	Little (2–1)	**Elliott** (3)	880	24–14	–	
May 7	6:00 p.m.	ACCNX	Duke	No. 15	Jim Patterson Stadium	**L** 3–13	(–)	(–)			24–15	14–10	
May 8	1:00 p.m.	ACCNX	Duke	No. 15	Jim Patterson Stadium	**W** 5–1	(–)	(–)			25–15	15–10	
May 8	4:30 p.m.	ACCNX	Duke	No. 15	Jim Patterson Stadium	**W** 15–6	(–)	(–)			26–15	16–10	
May 14	6:00 p.m.	ACCNX	at North Carolina		Boshamer Stadium; Chapel Hill, NC	**L** 1–5	(–)	(–)			26–16	16–11	
May 15	2:00 p.m.	ACCNX	at North Carolina		Boshamer Stadium	**L** 0–5	(–)	(–)			26–17	16–12	
May 16	1:00 p.m.	ACCNX	at North Carolina		Boshamer Stadium	**L** 5–10	(–)	(–)			26–18	16–13	
May 18	3:00 p.m.	ACCN	USC Upstate		Jim Patterson Stadium	**W** 8–6	(–)	(–)			27–18	–	
May 20	6:00 p.m.	ACCN	Miami (FL)		Jim Patterson Stadium	**L** 1–6	(–)	(–)			27–19	16–14	
May 21	6:00 p.m.	ACCN	Miami (FL)		Jim Patterson Stadium	**L** 0–2	(–)	(–)			27–20	16–15	
May 22	12:00 p.m.	ACCN	Miami (FL)		Jim Patterson Stadium	**L** 2–3	(–)	(–)			27–21	16–16	

Post-Season (1–1)

ACC Tournament (1–1)
Date	Time (ET)	TV	Opponent	Rank	Stadium	Score	Win	Loss	Save	Attendance	Overall	Postseason	Sources
May 25	11:00 a.m.	ACCNX	vs. Clemson		Truist Field; Charlotte, NC	**W** 15–10	(–)	(–)			28–21	1–0	
May 27	3:00 p.m.	ACCNX	vs. Georgia Tech		Truist Field	**L** 8–9^{12}	(–)	(–)			28–22	1–1	

== Rankings ==
Ranking movements Legend: ██ Increase in ranking ██ Decrease in ranking — = Not ranked ( ) = First-place votes
	Week																			
Poll	Pre	1	2	3	4	5	6	7	8	9	10	11	12	13	14	15	16	17	18	Final
Coaches'	6 (1)	6 (1)*	3	12	7	7	5	10	9	9	7	15	15	23	—	—	—*	—*	—*	—
Baseball America	7	5	4	15	8	7	6	5	2	4	5	12	11	19	—	—	—*	—*	—*	—
Collegiate Baseball^	11	6	4	14	11	7	5	7	7	8	8	13	8	18	—	—	—	—	—	—
NCBWA†	6	4	3	12	9	7	5	7	9	11	9	15	13	23	—	—	—	—	—	—
D1Baseball	5	4	5	10	8	7	7	7	7	7	7	15	15	—	—	—	—	—	—	—

^ Collegiate Baseball ranked 40 teams in their preseason poll, but only ranked 30 teams weekly during the season.
† NCBWA ranks 30 teams in their preseason poll, but only ranks 25 teams weekly during the season.
* A new poll was not released for this week, so for comparison purposes, the previous week's ranking is inserted in this week's slot.

== 2021 MLB draft ==
Player	Position	Round	Overall	MLB team
Henry Davis	C	1	1	Pittsburgh Pirates
Alex Binelas	3B	3	86	Milwaukee Brewers
Cooper Bowman	2B	4	122	New York Yankees
Michael Kirian	RHP	6	173	Washington Nationals
Lucas Dunn	INF/OF	8	250	San Diego Padres
Luke Brown	OF	9	253	Pittsburgh Pirates
Glenn Albanese	RHP	15	441	Los Angeles Angels
