= 2021 Clemson Tigers baseball team =

American college baseball season

2021 Clemson Tigers baseball
- Conference: Atlantic Coast Conference
- Record: 25–27 (16–20 ACC)
- Head coach: Monte Lee (6th season)
- Assistant coaches: Bradley LeCroy (14th season); Andrew See (6th season)
- Home stadium: Doug Kingsmore Stadium

2021 Atlantic Coast Conference baseball standings
	Conf.				Overall
Team	W		L	PCT	W		L	PCT
Atlantic
No. 10 Notre Dame ^{x}‍‍‍^{y}	25	–	10	.714	34	–	13	.723
No. 4 NC State ‍‍‍^{y}	19	–	14	.576	37	–	19	.661
Florida State ‍‍‍^{y}	20	–	16	.556	31	–	24	.564
Louisville ‍‍‍	16	–	16	.500	28	–	22	.560
Clemson ‍‍‍	16	–	20	.444	25	–	27	.481
Wake Forest ‍‍‍	10	–	22	.313	20	–	27	.426
Boston College ‍‍‍	10	–	23	.303	21	–	28	.429
Coastal
Georgia Tech ^{x}‍‍‍^{y}	21	–	15	.583	31	–	25	.554
Miami (FL) ‍‍‍^{y}	20	–	15	.571	33	–	21	.611
Virginia ‍‍‍^{y}	18	–	18	.500	36	–	27	.571
North Carolina ‍‍‍^{y}	18	–	18	.500	28	–	27	.509
Duke ‍‍‡‍^{y}	16	–	17	.485	33	–	22	.600
Pittsburgh ‍‍‍	16	–	17	.485	23	–	20	.535
Virginia Tech ‍‍‍	16	–	20	.444	27	–	25	.519
x – Division champion ‡ – Tournament champion y – Invited to the NCAA tournament As of July 1, 2021; Rankings from D1Baseball

The 2021 Clemson Tigers baseball team were the varsity intercollegiate baseball team that represented Clemson University during the 2021 NCAA Division I baseball season. The Tigers competed in the Atlantic Coast Conference (ACC) and were led by sixth-year head coach Monte Lee. Clemson played its home games at Doug Kingsmore Stadium in Clemson, South Carolina.

The Tigers finished the season 25–27 and 16–20 in ACC play to finish in fifth place in the Atlantic Division. As the eleventh seed in the ACC tournament they were placed in Pool B with second seed Georgia Tech and seventh seed Louisville. The Tigers lost to Louisville and defeated Georgia Tech. Their 1–1 record was not good enough to advance to the Semifinals and they were not invited to the NCAA tournament. The Tigers missed the NCAA tournament for the first time since 2008 and just the second time since 1987. This was also Clemson's first losing season since 1957. It was also head coach Monte Lee's first time missing the NCAA tournament as a head coach.

== Previous season ==
The 2020 season was impacted by the coronavirus pandemic. On March 12, it was announced that the 2020 NCAA tournament would be canceled due to the pandemic. Clemson University suspended all events until April 5, 2020. On March 17, the ACC cancelled all spring athletic activities and thereby ended the baseball season. The Tigers finished the season 14–3 and 3–0 in ACC play.

== Personnel ==
=== Roster ===
2021 Clemson Tigers roster
Pitchers: 19 – Keyshawn Askew – (redshirt) Sophomore; 20 – Mat Clark – (redshirt) Graduate Student; 22 – Ricky Williams – Freshman; 23 – Geoffrey Gilbert – (redshirt) Freshman; 25 – Jackson Lindley – (redshirt) Sophomore; 27 – Carter Raffield – (redshirt) Freshman; 32 – Mack Anglin – (redshirt) Freshman; 33 – Rasesh Pandya – (redshirt) Graduate Student; 36 – Ty Olenchuk – Freshman; 37 – Nick Hoffmann – (redshirt) Freshman; 39 – P.J. Labriola – (redshirt) Freshman; 41 – Alex Edmonson – Freshman; 42 – Ryan Ammons – (redshirt) Freshman; 43 – Connor O'Rear – (redshirt) Sophomore; 44 – Nick Clayotn – (redshirt) Freshman; 48 – Rob Hughes – (redshirt) Sophomore; 52 – Evan Estridge – (redshirt) Graduate Student; 54 – Patrick Bott – Freshman; 55 – Bryson Hammer– Freshman; 56 – Braison Bourne – Freshman	Catchers: 9 – Jonathan French – (redshirt) Freshman; 17 – Adam Hackenberg – (redshirt) Sophomore; Infielders: 4 – Pierce Gallo – (redshirt) Freshman; 8 – Blake Wright – Freshman; 10 – Bryar Hawkins – (redshirt) Sophomore; 15 – James Parker – (redshirt) Sophomore; 16 – Bo Majkowski – (redshirt) Junior; 24 – Mac Starbuck – (redshirt) Freshman; 29 – Max Wagner – Freshman	Outfielders: 1 – Kier Meredith – (redshirt) Sophomore; 13 – Bryce Teodosio – (redshirt) Junior; 46 – Alex Urban – Freshman; 47 – Matthew Lumsden – (redshirt) Freshman; 51 – Noah Stout – Freshman; Utility: 3 – Dylan Brewer (OF/1B) – (redshirt) Freshman; 5 – Sam Hall (INF/OF) – (redshirt) Junior; 6 – Elijah Henderson (INF/OF) – (redshirt) Sophomore; 11 – Chad Fairey (1B/OF) – (redshirt) Sophomore; 12 – Cooper Ingle (C/OF/INF) – Freshman; 21 – JD Brock (P/OF) – (redshirt) Freshman; 26 – Matt Cooper (OF/1B/C) – (redshirt) Junior; 30 – Davis Sharpe (P/1B) – (redshirt) Sophomore; 31 – Caden Grice (P/1B) – Freshman; 45 – Landon Lucas (INF/P) – Freshman; 49 – Regan Reid (INF/OF/C) – (redshirt) Freshman; 53 – Brett Ahalt (INF/OF) – Freshman

=== Coaching staff ===
2021 Clemson Tigers coaching staff
Name	Position	Seasons at Clemson
Monte Lee	Head coach	6
Bradley LeCroy	Assistant Coach	14
Andrew See	Assistant Coach	6
Jared Broughton	Volunteer Assistant Coach	2

== Schedule ==
Legend
	Clemson win
	Clemson loss
	Cancellation
**Bold**	Clemson team member
*	Non-Conference game
†	Make-Up Game

2021 Clemson Tigers baseball game log
Regular season

February (3–2)
Date	Opponent	Rank	Site/stadium	Score	Win	Loss	Save	Attendance	Overall record	ACC record
Feb 19	Cincinnati*		Doug Kingsmore Stadium • Clemson, SC	**W** 5–0	**Sharpe (1–0)**	Moore (0–1)	**Clark (1)**	1,280	1–0	0–0
Feb 20	Cincinnati*		Doug Kingsmore Stadium • Clemson, SC	**W** 5–2	**Olenchuck (1–0)**	McCarthy (0–1)	**Gilbert (1)**	1,280	2–0	0–0
Feb 21	Cincinnati*		Doug Kingsmore Stadium • Clemson, SC	**W** 8–7 (10)	**Hoffmann (1–0)**	Moore (0–2)	None	1,280	3–0	0–0
Feb 26	No. 17 South Carolina*; Rivalry		Doug Kingsmore Stadium • Clemson, SC	Canceled due to weather						
Feb 27	vs. No. 17 South Carolina*; Rivalry		Fluor Field • Greenville, SC	**L** 2–3 (11)	Sanders (1–0)	**Gilbert (0–1)**	None	1,800	3–1	0–0
Feb 28	at No. 17 South Carolina*; Rivalry		Founders Park • Columbia, SC	**L** 7–8	Sanders (2–0)	**Estridge (0–1)**	None	1,938	3–2	0–0

March (9–8)
Date	Opponent	Rank	Site/stadium	Score	Win	Loss	Save	Attendance	Overall record	ACC record
Mar 2	East Tennessee State*		Doug Kingsmore Stadium • Clemson, SC	**W** 7–3	**Clayton (1–0)**	Montagna (0–1)	None	1,280	4–2	0–0
Mar 5	Notre Dame		Doug Kingsmore Stadium • Clemson, SC	**W** 13–7	**Sharpe (2–0)**	Sheehan (0–1)	None	1,280	5–2	1–0
Mar 6	Notre Dame		Doug Kingsmore Stadium • Clemson, SC	**L** 1–3	Bertrand (1–0)	**Olenchuk (1–1)**	Mercer (1)	1,280	5–3	1–1
Mar 7	Notre Dame		Doug Kingsmore Stadium • Clemson, SC	**L** 2–3	Simon (2–0)	**Anglin (0–1)**	Brannigan (1)	1,280	5–4	1–2
Mar 9	USC Upstate*		Doug Kingsmore Stadium • Clemson, SC	**L** 2–12	Hupp (1–0)	**Grice (0–1)**	None	1,280	5–5	1–2
Mar 12	at North Carolina		Boshamer Stadium • Chapel Hill, NC	**L** 3–8	Love (3–0)	**Sharpe (2–1)**	None	780	5–6	1–3
Mar 13	at North Carolina		Boshamer Stadium • Chapel Hill, NC	**L** 4–5	Lancellotti (1–1)	**Olenchuk (1–2)**	O'Brien (1)	780	5–7	1–4
Mar 14	at North Carolina		Boshamer Stadium • Chapel Hill, NC	**L** 3–5	Alba (2–1)	**Raffield (0–1)**	O'Brien (2)	764	5–8	1–5
Mar 16	Georgia State*		Doug Kingsmore Stadium • Clemson, SC	**W** 7–2	**Hoffmann (2–0)**	Matela (0–3)	None	1,280	6–8	1–5
Mar 19	No. 25 Virginia Tech		Doug Kingsmore Stadium • Clemson, SC	**W** 8–2	**Clark (1–0)**	Alford (0–1)	None	1,280	7–8	2–5
Mar 20	No. 25 Virginia Tech		Doug Kingsmore Stadium • Clemson, SC	**L** 3–11	Heard (2–0)	**Olenchuk (1–3)**	None	1,280	7–9	2–6
Mar 21	No. 25 Virginia Tech		Doug Kingsmore Stadium • Clemson, SC	**W** 4–2	**Gilbert (1–1)**	Johnson (0–2)	None	1,280	8–9	3–6
Mar 23	vs. Georgia Southern*		SRP Park • North Augusta, SC	**W** 6–4	**Clayton (2–0)**	Parker (0–1)	None	1,498	9–9	3–6
Mar 26	at Boston College		Eddie Pellagrini Diamond • Brighton, MA	**W** 16–12	**Estridge (1–1)**	Walsh (1–2)	**Gilbert (2)**	150	10–9	4–6
Mar 27	at Boston College		Eddie Pellagrini Diamond • Brighton, MA	**W** 9–3 (10)	**Clayton (3–0)**	Coon (1–1)	None	150	11–9	5–6
Mar 27	at Boston College		Eddie Pellagrini Diamond • Brighton, MA	**W** 7–2	**Hoffmann (3–0)**	Stiegler (1–1)	None	150	12–9	6–6
Mar 30	Georgia*		Doug Kingsmore Stadium • Clemson, SC	**L** 0–2	Goldstein (1–0)	**Raffield (0–2)**	Pasqua (1)	1,280	12–10	6–6

April (7–8)
Date	Opponent	Rank	Site/stadium	Score	Win	Loss	Save	Attendance	Overall record	ACC record
Apr 2	at NC State		Doak Field • Raleigh, NC	**W** 10–6	**Clayton (4–0)**	Johnston (2–1)	None	362	13–10	7–6
Apr 3	at NC State		Doak Field • Raleigh, NC	**W** 9–3	**Askew (1–0)**	Highfill (1–2)	**Gilbert (3)**	442	14–10	8–6
Apr 4	at NC State		Doak Field • Raleigh, NC	**L** 5–9	Justice (2–2)	**Gilbert (1–2)**	None	360	14–11	8–7
Apr 9	Virginia		Doug Kingsmore Stadium • Clemson, SC	**W** 6–1	**Anglin (1–1)**	Abbott (3–5)	Clark (2)'	1,280	15–11	9–7
Apr 10	Virginia		Doug Kingsmore Stadium • Clemson, SC	**L** 4–8	Vasil (5–2)	**Clayton (4–1)**	None	1,280	15–12	9–8
Apr 11	Virginia		Doug Kingsmore Stadium • Clemson, SC	**L** 5–6	Bales (2–0)	**Gilbert (1–3)**	Schoch (6)	1,280	15–13	9–9
Apr 13	College of Charleston*		Doug Kingsmore Stadium • Clemson, SC	**L** 6–13	Carr (2–3)	**Olenchuk (1–4)**	None	1,280	15–14	9–9
Apr 16	at Miami (FL)		Alex Rodriguez Park • Coral Gables, FL	**L** 3–12	Rosario (4–2)	**Anglin (1–2)**	None	651	15–15	9–10
Apr 17	at Miami (FL)		Alex Rodriguez Park • Coral Gables, FL	**L** 2–10	Federman (4–4)	**Askew (1–1)**	None	646	15–16	9–11
Apr 18	at Miami (FL)		Alex Rodriguez Park • Coral Gables, FL	**L** 2–3	Palmquist (1–0)	**Clark (1–1)**	None	629	15–17	9–12
Apr 20	at Georgia*		Foley Field • Athens, GA	**L** 7–8	Pasqua (2–2)	**Gilbert (1–4)**	None	664	15–18	9–12
Apr 23	Wake Forest		Doug Kingsmore Stadium • Clemson, SC	**W** 5–2	**Gilbert (2–4)**	Cusick (2–3)	**Hoffmann (1)**	1,556	16–18	10–12
Apr 25	Wake Forest		Doug Kingsmore Stadium • Clemson, SC	**W** 6–4	**Clayton (5–1)**	Furtado (1–4)	None	1,340	17–18	11–12
Apr 25	Wake Forest		Doug Kingsmore Stadium • Clemson, SC	**W** 3–2	**Hoffmann (4–0)**	Fleming (2–5)	None	1,340	18–18	12–12
Apr 30	No. 7 Louisville		Doug Kingsmore Stadium • Clemson, SC	**W** 11–3	**Anglin (2–2)**	Kirian (5–1)	None	1,782	19–18	13–12

May (5–8)
Date	Opponent	Rank	Site/stadium	Score	Win	Loss	Save	Attendance	Overall record	ACC record
May 1	No. 7 Louisville		Doug Kingsmore Stadium • Clemson, SC	**W** 5–4	**Gilbert (3–4)**	Kuehner (3–4)	**Hoffmann (2)**	1,912	20–18	14–12
May 2	No. 7 Louisville		Doug Kingsmore Stadium • Clemson, SC	**W** 15–5	**Hughes (1–0)**	Smith (3–3)	None	1,873	21–18	15–12
May 5	USC Upstate*		Doug Kingsmore Stadium • Clemson, SC	**W** 9–2	**Clayton (6–1)**	Worrell (4–1)	**Hoffmann (3)**	1,580	22–18	15–12
May 7	at Georgia Tech		Russ Chandler Stadium • Atlanta, GA	**L** 1–6	Hurter (4–4)	**Anglin (2–3)**	None	935	22–19	15–13
May 8	at Georgia Tech		Russ Chandler Stadium • Atlanta, GA	**L** 5–6	Huff (1–0)	**Gilbert (3–5)**	None	1,163	22–20	15–14
May 9	at Georgia Tech		Russ Chandler Stadium • Atlanta, GA	**L** 8–9	Crawford (3–4)	**Clayton (6–2)**	Huff (2)	1,136	22–21	15–15
May 11	No. 25 South Carolina		Doug Kingsmore Stadium • Clemson, SC	**W** 7–2	**Labriola (1–0)**	Lloyd (0–1)	**Hoffmann (4)**	2,205	23–21	15–15
May 14	at No. 17 Florida State		Dick Howser Stadium • Tallahassee, FL	**L** 3–8	Hubbart (6–4)	**Anglin (2–4)**	Anderson (4)	1,804	23–22	15–16
May 15	at No. 17 Florida State		Dick Howser Stadium • Tallahassee, FL	**W** 9–5	**Sharpe (3–1)**	Crowell (1–2)	None	1,971	24–22	16–16
May 16	at No. 17 Florida State		Dick Howser Stadium • Tallahassee, FL	**L** 6–9	Anderson (2–0)	**Hoffmann (4–1)**	None	1,798	24–23	16–17
May 20	Duke		Doug Kingsmore Stadium • Clemson, SC	**L** 1–5	Carey (4–2)	**Anglin (2–5)**	Johnson (5)	1,846	24–24	16–18
May 21	Duke		Doug Kingsmore Stadium • Clemson, SC	**L** 8–14	Allen (3–1)	**Askew (1–2)**	Loper (5)	1,894	24–25	16–19
May 22	Duke		Doug Kingsmore Stadium • Clemson, SC	**L** 2–3	Johnson (4–3)	**Gilbert (3–6)**	None	1,944	24–26	16–20

Postseason

ACC Tournament (1–1)
Date	Opponent	Rank	Site/stadium	Score	Win	Loss	Save	Attendance	Overall record	Tournament record
May 25	(7) Louisville		Truist Field • Charlotte, NC	**L** 10–15	Webster (2–1)	**Anglin (2–6)**	None	2,857	24–27	0–1
May 26	(2) Georgia Tech		Truist Field • Charlotte, NC	**W** 11–5	**Sharpe (4–1)**	Smith (2–2)	None	3,915	25–27	1–1

Note: All rankings shown are from the D1 Baseball poll.

== Rankings ==
Ranking movements Legend: ██ Increase in ranking ██ Decrease in ranking — = Not ranked RV = Received votes
	Week																
Poll	Pre	1	2	3	4	5	6	7	8	9	10	11	12	13	14	15	Final
Coaches'	RV	RV*	RV	RV	—	—	—	RV	RV	—	—	RV	—	—	—	—	—
Baseball America	—	—	—	—	—	—	—	—	—	—	—	—	—	—	—	—	—
Collegiate Baseball^	25	22	—	—	—	—	—	—	—	—	—	27	—	—	—	—	—
NCBWA†	32	30	—	—	—	—	—	—	—	—	—	RV	—	—	—	—	—
D1Baseball	—	—	—	—	—	—	—	—	—	—	—	—	—	—	—	—	—

^ Collegiate Baseball ranked 40 teams in their preseason poll, but only ranked 30 teams weekly during the season.
† NCBWA ranks 30 teams in their preseason poll, but only ranks 25 teams weekly during the season.
* A new poll was not released for this week, so for comparison purposes, the previous week's ranking is inserted in this week's slot.

== 2021 MLB draft ==
Player	Position	Round	Overall	MLB team
James Parker	SS	8	234	Seattle Mariners
Keyshawn Askew	LHP	10	292	New York Mets
Mack Anglin	RHP	13	383	Washington Nationals
Davis Sharpe	RHP	13	396	Cleveland Indians
Carter Raffield	RHP	14	420	Cincinnati Reds
Adam Hackenberg	C	18	545	Chicago White Sox

Anglin did not sign and returned to Clemson.
