= 2021 Wake Forest Demon Deacons baseball team =

American college baseball season

2021 Wake Forest Demon Deacons baseball
- Conference: Atlantic Coast Conference
- CB: No. 17
- Head coach: Tom Walter (12th season)
- Assistant coaches: Bill Cilento (12th season); John Hendricks (4th season); Joey Hammond (7th season)
- Home stadium: David F. Couch Ballpark

2021 Atlantic Coast Conference baseball standings
	Conf.				Overall
Team	W		L	PCT	W		L	PCT
Atlantic
No. 10 Notre Dame ^{x}‍‍‍^{y}	25	–	10	.714	34	–	13	.723
No. 4 NC State ‍‍‍^{y}	19	–	14	.576	37	–	19	.661
Florida State ‍‍‍^{y}	20	–	16	.556	31	–	24	.564
Louisville ‍‍‍	16	–	16	.500	28	–	22	.560
Clemson ‍‍‍	16	–	20	.444	25	–	27	.481
Wake Forest ‍‍‍	10	–	22	.313	20	–	27	.426
Boston College ‍‍‍	10	–	23	.303	21	–	28	.429
Coastal
Georgia Tech ^{x}‍‍‍^{y}	21	–	15	.583	31	–	25	.554
Miami (FL) ‍‍‍^{y}	20	–	15	.571	33	–	21	.611
Virginia ‍‍‍^{y}	18	–	18	.500	36	–	27	.571
North Carolina ‍‍‍^{y}	18	–	18	.500	28	–	27	.509
Duke ‍‍‡‍^{y}	16	–	17	.485	33	–	22	.600
Pittsburgh ‍‍‍	16	–	17	.485	23	–	20	.535
Virginia Tech ‍‍‍	16	–	20	.444	27	–	25	.519
x – Division champion ‡ – Tournament champion y – Invited to the NCAA tournament As of July 1, 2021; Rankings from D1Baseball

The 2021 Wake Forest Demon Deacons baseball team represented Wake Forest University during the 2021 NCAA Division I baseball season. The Demon Deacons play their home games at David F. Couch Ballpark as a member of the Atlantic Coast Conference. They were led by head coach Tom Walter in his 12th season at Wake Forest.

== Personnel ==
2021 Wake Forest Demon Deacons roster
Pitchers: 4 – Rhett Lowder – Freshman; 7 – Eric Adler – Sophomore; 8 – Hunter Furtado – Freshman; 10 – Camden Minacci – Freshman; 15 - Brennen Oxford – (redshirt) Sophomore; 19 – Crawford Wade – Freshman; 21 – Shane Smith – (redshirt) Sophomore; 26 – Seth Keener – Freshman; 27 – Antonio Menendez – Senior; 30 – Andrew Rust – Junior; 33 – Ryan Cusick – Junior; 35 – Will Andrews – Freshman; 36 – JD Everett – Freshman; 38 – William Flemming – Senior; 40 – Reed Mascolo – Sophomore; 42 – Teddy McGraw – Freshman; 45 – Reese Robinson – (redshirt) Senior	Catchers: 9 – Brendan Tinsman – Junior; 11 – Shane Muntz – Senior; 23 – John Meany – Sophomore; Infielders: 0 – Lucas Costello – Freshman; 1 – Drew Kendall – Junior; 3 – Bobby Seymour – Senior; 5 – Pirece Bennett – Sophomore; 6 – Michael Turconi – Junior; 14 – Carmine Petosa – Freshman; 17 – Cole McNamee – Senior; 25 – Brock Wilken – Freshman; 28 – James Broderick – Freshman; 31 – Parker Pilat – Sophomore; 41 – Jake Reinisch – Freshman	Outfielders: 12 – Adam Cecere – Sophomore; 18 – Dane Stewart – Freshman; 20 – Derek Crum – Sophomore; 22 – Michael Ludowig – Senior; 24 – Chris Lanzilli – Senior; 34 – Caleb Marmo – Freshman; 39 – Pirmin Brechbuhl – Freshman

=== Coaching staff ===
Name	Position	Seasons at Wake Forest	Alma mater
Tom Walter	Head coach	12	Georgetown University (1991)
Bill Cilento	Assistant Coach	12	Siena College (2003)
John Hendricks	Assistant Coach	4	Wake Forest University (2000)

== Rankings ==
Ranking movements
	Week																			
Poll	Pre	1	2	3	4	5	6	7	8	9	10	11	12	13	14	15	16	17	18	Final
Coaches'		*																		
Baseball America																				
Collegiate Baseball^	17																			
NCBWA†																				

^ Collegiate Baseball ranked 40 teams in their preseason poll, but only ranked 30 teams weekly during the season.
† NCBWA ranks 30 teams in their preseason poll, but only ranks 25 teams weekly during the season.
* A new poll was not released for this week, so for comparison purposes, the previous week's ranking is inserted in this week's slot.
