= 2021 Florida State Seminoles baseball team =

American college baseball season

2021 Florida State Seminoles baseball

NCAA tournament, Regional
- Conference: Atlantic Coast Conference
- Atlantic Division
- Record: 31–24 (20–16 ACC)
- Head coach: Mike Martin, Jr. (2nd season)
- Assistant coaches: Jimmy Belanger (2nd season); Mike Metcalf (2nd season); Tyler Holt (3rd season)
- Home stadium: Mike Martin Field at Dick Howser Stadium (Capacity: 6,700)

2021 Atlantic Coast Conference baseball standings
	Conf.				Overall
Team	W		L	PCT	W		L	PCT
Atlantic
No. 10 Notre Dame ^{x}‍‍‍^{y}	25	–	10	.714	34	–	13	.723
No. 4 NC State ‍‍‍^{y}	19	–	14	.576	37	–	19	.661
Florida State ‍‍‍^{y}	20	–	16	.556	31	–	24	.564
Louisville ‍‍‍	16	–	16	.500	28	–	22	.560
Clemson ‍‍‍	16	–	20	.444	25	–	27	.481
Wake Forest ‍‍‍	10	–	22	.313	20	–	27	.426
Boston College ‍‍‍	10	–	23	.303	21	–	28	.429
Coastal
Georgia Tech ^{x}‍‍‍^{y}	21	–	15	.583	31	–	25	.554
Miami (FL) ‍‍‍^{y}	20	–	15	.571	33	–	21	.611
Virginia ‍‍‍^{y}	18	–	18	.500	36	–	27	.571
North Carolina ‍‍‍^{y}	18	–	18	.500	28	–	27	.509
Duke ‍‍‡‍^{y}	16	–	17	.485	33	–	22	.600
Pittsburgh ‍‍‍	16	–	17	.485	23	–	20	.535
Virginia Tech ‍‍‍	16	–	20	.444	27	–	25	.519
x – Division champion ‡ – Tournament champion y – Invited to the NCAA tournament As of July 1, 2021; Rankings from D1Baseball

The 2021 Florida State Seminoles baseball team represented Florida State University in the 2021 NCAA Division I baseball season. The Seminoles played their home games at Mike Martin Field at Dick Howser Stadium as a member of the Atlantic Coast Conference. They were led by head baseball coach Mike Martin, Jr. in his second year as head coach.

== Previous season ==
In 2020, the Seminoles finished with an overall record of 12-5, 1-2 in ACC Conference play, including a win against then-unbeaten rival Florida, before the season was cancelled due to the COVID-19 pandemic.

== Schedule ==
2021 Florida State Seminoles baseball game log
Legend: = Win = Loss = Canceled Bold = Florida State team member * Non-conference game
Regular season (29–21)

February (2–4)
Date	Time (ET)	TV	Opponent	Rank	Stadium	Score	Win	Loss	Save	Attendance	Overall	ACC	Sources
February 20	2:00 p.m.	ACCNX	North Florida*	No. 24	Dick Howser Stadium; Tallahassee, Florida	**L** 4–7	McKinley (1–0)	**Messick (0–1)**	Reitz (1)	1,496	0–1	—	Report
February 21	11:00 a.m.	ACCNX	North Florida*	No. 24	Dick Howser Stadium	**W** 14–7	**Hubbart (1–0)**	Madonna (0–1)	—	1,362	1–1	—	Report
February 21	3:15 p.m.	ACCNX	North Florida*	No. 24	Dick Howser Stadium	**W** 8–4				1,362	2–1	—	Report
February 26		ACCNX	Pitt	No. 24	Dick Howser Stadium								
February 27		ACCN	Pitt	No. 24	Dick Howser Stadium								
February 28		ACCNX	Pitt	No. 24	Dick Howser Stadium								

March (11–4)
Date	Time (ET)	TV	Opponent	Rank	Stadium	Score	Win	Loss	Save	Attendance	Overall	ACC	Sources
March 2			Mercer*		Dick Howser Stadium							—	
March 5			No. 17 Virginia		Dick Howser Stadium								
March 6			No. 17 Virginia		Dick Howser Stadium								
March 7			No. 17 Virginia		Dick Howser Stadium								
March 9			South Florida*		Dick Howser Stadium							—	
March 12			at No. 18 Virginia Tech		Dick Howser Stadium								
March 13			at No. 18 Virginia Tech		Dick Howser Stadium								
March 14			at No. 18 Virginia Tech		Dick Howser Stadium								
March 16			Florida*		Dick Howser Stadium							—	

April (9–7)
Date	Time (ET)	TV	Opponent	Rank	Stadium	Score	Win	Loss	Save	Attendance	Overall	ACC	Sources

May (7–6)
Date	Time (ET)	TV	Opponent	Rank	Stadium	Score	Win	Loss	Save	Attendance	Overall	ACC	Sources

Post-season (2–3)

ACC Tournament (1–1)
Date	Time (ET)	TV	Opponent	Rank	Stadium	Score	Win	Loss	Save	Attendance	Overall	ACCT	Sources
May 26	11:05 a.m.	ACCRSN	vs. (9) Duke; Pool D	(5)	Truist Field; Charlotte, North Carolina	**L** 1–12	Seidl (4–0)	**Hubbart (6–5)**	—	1,219	29–22	0–1	Report
May 28	3:05 p.m.	ACCRSN	vs. (4) Miami (FL); Pool D	(5)	Truist Field	**W** 6–3	**Messick (7–2)**	Garland (6–3)	**Scolaro (1)**	3,655	30–22	1–1	Report

NCAA Oxford Regional (1–2)
Date	Time (ET)	TV	Opponent	Rank	Stadium	Score	Win	Loss	Save	Attendance	Overall	NCAAT	Sources
June 4	2:05 p.m.	ESPNU	vs. (2) No. 19 Southern Miss; Regional Game 1	(3)	Swayze Field; Oxford, Mississippi	**W** 5–2	**Messick (8–2)**	Stanley (6–4)	**Anderson (5)**	10,310	31–22	1–0	Report
June 5	6:00 p.m.	ESPN2	at (1) No. 13 Ole Miss; Regional Game 4	(3)	Swayze Field	**L** 3–4	Nikhazy (10–2)	**Hare (1–2)**	Broadway (15)	10,830	31–23	1–1	Report
June 6	2:05 p.m.	ACCN	vs. (2) No. 19 Southern Miss; Regional Game 5	(3)	Swayze Field	**L** 4–7	Och (8–0)	**Perdue (1–3)**	Waldrep (3)	10,171	31–24	1–2	Report

== 2021 MLB draft ==
Player	Position	Round	Overall	MLB team
Matheu Nelson	C	A	35	Cincinnati Reds
Robby Martin	OF	8	230	Colorado Rockies
Hunter Perdue	RHP	10	299	Miami Marlins
Jack Anderson	RHP	16	465	Detroit Tigers
Elijah Cabell	OF	17	511	St. Louis Cardinals
Conor Grady	RHP	18	527	Baltimore Orioles
Tyler Ahearn	RHP	20	590	Colorado Rockies
