= 2021 Virginia Cavaliers baseball team =

Baseball team season

2021 Virginia Cavaliers baseball

NCAA Columbia Regional champion NCAA Columbia Super Regional champion

College World Series, 1–2
- Conference: Atlantic Coast Conference
- Record: 36–27 (18–18 ACC)
- Head coach: Brian O'Connor (18th season)
- Assistant coaches: Kevin McMullan (18th season); Matt Kirby (10th season)
- Pitching coach: Drew Dickinson (2nd season)
- Home stadium: Davenport Field

2021 Atlantic Coast Conference baseball standings
	Conf.				Overall
Team	W		L	PCT	W		L	PCT
Atlantic
No. 10 Notre Dame ^{x}‍‍‍^{y}	25	–	10	.714	34	–	13	.723
No. 4 NC State ‍‍‍^{y}	19	–	14	.576	37	–	19	.661
Florida State ‍‍‍^{y}	20	–	16	.556	31	–	24	.564
Louisville ‍‍‍	16	–	16	.500	28	–	22	.560
Clemson ‍‍‍	16	–	20	.444	25	–	27	.481
Wake Forest ‍‍‍	10	–	22	.313	20	–	27	.426
Boston College ‍‍‍	10	–	23	.303	21	–	28	.429
Coastal
Georgia Tech ^{x}‍‍‍^{y}	21	–	15	.583	31	–	25	.554
Miami (FL) ‍‍‍^{y}	20	–	15	.571	33	–	21	.611
Virginia ‍‍‍^{y}	18	–	18	.500	36	–	27	.571
North Carolina ‍‍‍^{y}	18	–	18	.500	28	–	27	.509
Duke ‍‍‡‍^{y}	16	–	17	.485	33	–	22	.600
Pittsburgh ‍‍‍	16	–	17	.485	23	–	20	.535
Virginia Tech ‍‍‍	16	–	20	.444	27	–	25	.519
x – Division champion ‡ – Tournament champion y – Invited to the NCAA tournament As of July 1, 2021; Rankings from D1Baseball

The 2021 Virginia Cavaliers baseball team represented the University of Virginia during the 2021 NCAA Division I baseball season. The Cavaliers played their home games at Davenport Field as a member of the Atlantic Coast Conference. They were led by head coach Brian O'Connor, in his 18th season at Virginia.

Virginia qualified for the College World Series for the first time since the 2015 national championship season, where they finished 1–2.

== Personnel ==
=== Roster ===
2021 Virginia Cavaliers baseball roster
Pitchers: 14 – Brandon Neeck – Junior; 15 – Matt Wyatt – Sophomore; 16 – Andrew Abbott – Senior; 17 - Jacob Hodorovich - Sophomore; 25 – Griff McGarry – Senior; 27 - Avery Mabe - Freshman; 28 – Rece Ritchey – Freshman; 29 – Zach Messinger – Junior; 30 – Nate Savino – Sophomore; 32 - Jake Berry - Freshman; 33 – Paul Kosanovich – Graduate; 34 – Channing Austin – Freshman; 35 – Blake Bales – Senior; 37 – Stephen Schoch – Graduate; 38 – Kyle Whitten – Senior; 40 – Billy Price – Junior; 43 – Jacob Baldino – Sophomore; 45 - Luke Schauer - Freshman; 48 – Mike Vasil – Junior	Catchers: 12 – Logan Michaels – Graduate; Infielders: 2 – Max Cotier – Sophomore; 4 – Nic Kent – Junior; 10 – Tate Ballestero – Sophomore; 18 – Zack Gelof – Junior; 21 – David Coppedge – Freshman; 22 - Jake Gelof - Freshman; 23 – Connor Hincks – Freshman	Outfielders: 6 – Christian Hlinka – Senior; 9 – Chris Newell – Sophomore; 11 – Addie Burrow – Freshman; 20 – Marc Lebreux – Senior; 31 – Jimmy Sullivan – Junior; Utility: 3 - Kyle Teel - Freshman; 5 – Drew Hamrock – Junior; 7 – Devin Ortiz – Senior; 8 – Brendan Rivoli – Senior; 13 – Alex Tappen – Senior; 19 – Alex Greene – Freshman

== Game log ==
Legend
	UVA win
	UVA loss
	Postponement/cancellation
(10)	Extra innings
*	Non-conference game
**Bold**	UVA team member
†	Make-Up Game

2021 Virginia Cavaliers baseball game log
Regular season (13–14)

February (4–3)
Date	Opponent	Rank	Site/stadium	Score	Win	Loss	Save	Attendance	Overall record	ACC record
February 19	UConn*	No. 16	Davenport Field; Charlottesville, Virginia	**W** 2–1	**Abbott (1–0)**	Casparius (0–1)	**Schoch (1)**	250	1–0	—
February 20	UConn*	No. 16	Davenport Field	**L** 9–10	Wurster (1–0)	**Whitten (0–1)**	none	250	1–1	—
February 21	UConn*	No. 16	Davenport Field	**W** 4–2	**Vasil (1–0)**	Wang (0–1)	**Schoch (2)**	250	2–1	—
February 23	VMI*	No. 12	Davenport Field	**W** 14–5	**Bales (1–0)**	Light (0–1)	—	250	3–1	—
February 26	at No. 25 North Carolina; South's Oldest Rivalry	No. 12	Boshamer Stadium; Chapel Hill, North Carolina	**L** 2–3	Love (2–0)	**Abbott (1–1)**	Ollio (2)	100	3–2	0–1
February 27	at No. 25 North Carolina; South's Oldest Rivalry	No. 12	Boshamer Stadium	**L** 1–2	Carlson (2–0)	**McGarry (0–1)**	Pry (1)	800	3–3	0–2
February 28	at No. 25 North Carolina; South's Oldest Rivalry	No. 12	Boshamer Stadium	**W** 3–2	**Vasil (2–0)**	Alba (1–1)	**Schoch (3)**	900	4–3	1–2

March (7–10)
Date	Opponent	Rank	Site/stadium	Score	Win	Loss	Save	Attendance	Overall record	ACC record
March 2	George Washington*	No. 17	Davenport Field	**W** 11–1	**Wyatt (1–0)**	Solt (0–1)	—	74	5–3	—
March 5	at Florida State	No. 17	Dick Howser Stadium; Tallahassee, Florida	**L** 0–2	Messick (1–2)	**Abbott (1–2)**	Purdue (1)	1,422	5–4	1–3
March 6	at Florida State	No. 17	Dick Howser Stadium	**L** 4–9	Hubbart (2–1)	**McGarry (0–2)**	—	1,494	5–5	1–4
March 7	at Florida State	No. 17	Dick Howser Stadium	**W** 2–1	**Vasil (3–0)**	Grady (1–1)	**Schoch (4)**	1,388	6–5	2–4
March 9	Richmond*	No. 25	Davenport Field	**W** 7–0	**Messinger (1–0)**	Lowe (0–1)	—	117	7–5	—
March 12	No. 23 Notre Dame	No. 25	Davenport Field	**L** 5–10	Simon (3–0)	**Abbott (1–3)**	Sheridan (1)	221	7–6	2–5
March 13	No. 23 Notre Dame	No. 25	Davenport Field	**L** 4–12	Bertrand (2–0)	**Kosanovich (0–1)**	—	354	7–7	2–6
March 14	No. 23 Notre Dame	No. 25	Davenport Field	**L** 3–8	Tyrell (1–0)	**Vasil (3–1)**	Kohlhepp (1)	361	7–8	2–7
March 17	Towson*		Davenport Field	**W** 5–0	**Kosanovich (1–1)**	Reeser (0–2)	—	246	8–8	—
March 20	No. 18 Pitt		Davenport Field	**L** 1–2	Myers (2–2)	**Abbott (1–4)**	—	362	8–9	2–8
March 21	No. 18 Pitt		Davenport Field	**L** 2–6	Gilbertson (3–2)	**McGarry (0–3)**	—	492	8–10	2–9
March 22	No. 18 Pitt		Davenport Field	**W** 10–4	**Savino (1–0)**	Smith (1–1)	—	346	9–10	3–9
March 23	at Liberty*		Liberty Baseball Stadium; Lynchburg, Virginia	**L** 2–10	Erickson (5–0)	**Wyatt (1–1)**	—	597	9–11	—
March 26	No. 19 Miami (FL)		Davenport Field	**L** 6–8	Rosario (3–1)	**Savino (1–1)**	Palmquist (6)	466	9–12	3–10
March 27	No. 19 Miami (FL)		Davenport Field	**W** 4–0	**Abbott (2–4)**	Mederos (0–2)	—	552	10–12	4–10
March 28	No. 19 Miami (FL)		Davenport Field	**L** 2–4	Federman (1–3)	Vasil (3–2)	Palmquist (7)	448	10–13	4–11
March 30	at George Washington*		Barcroft Park; Arlington, Virginia	**W** 7–2	**Messinger (2–0)**	McGinnis (1–2)	—	0	11–13	—

April (2–1)
Date	Opponent	Rank	Site/stadium	Score	Win	Loss	Save	Attendance	Overall record	ACC record
April 1	at No. 6 Georgia Tech		Russ Chandler Stadium; Atlanta, Georgia	**L** 5–6	Hurter (3–2)	**McGarry (0–4)**	Bartnicki (3)	713	11–14	4–12
April 2	at No. 6 Georgia Tech		Russ Chandler Stadium	**W** 8–2	**Abbott (3–4)**	Archer (4–2)	—	713	12–14	5–12
April 3	at No. 6 Georgia Tech		Russ Chandler Stadium	**W** 11–4	**Vasil (4–2)**	Crawford (2–3)	**Schoch (5)**	713	13–14	6–12
April 6	William & Mary*		Davenport Field							—
April 9	at Clemson		Doug Kingsmore Stadium; Clemson, South Carolina							
April 10	at Clemson		Doug Kingsmore Stadium							
April 11	at Clemson		Doug Kingsmore Stadium							
April 14	No. 22 Old Dominion*		Davenport Field							—
April 16	Louisville		Davenport Field							
April 17	Louisville		Davenport Field							
April 18	Louisville		Davenport Field							
April 20	at VCU*; Duel at the Diamond		The Diamond; Richmond, Virginia							—
April 23	Duke		Davenport Field							
April 24	Duke		Davenport Field							
April 25	Duke		Davenport Field							
April 27	Liberty*		Davenport Field							—
April 30	at Virginia Tech; Commonwealth Series		English Field; Blacksburg, Virginia							

May (0–0)
Date	Opponent	Rank	Site/stadium	Score	Win	Loss	Save	Attendance	Overall record	ACC record
May 1	at Virginia Tech; Commonwealth Series		English Field							
May 2	at Virginia Tech; Commonwealth Series		English Field							
May 4	VCU*; Duel at the Diamond		Davenport Field							—
May 14	Wake Forest		Davenport Field							
May 15	Wake Forest		Davenport Field							
May 16	Wake Forest		Davenport Field							
May 20	at Boston College		Eddie Pellagrini Diamond; Boston, Massachusetts							
May 21	at Boston College		Eddie Pellagrini Diamond							
May 22	at Boston College		Eddie Pellagrini Diamond							

Postseason (0–0)

ACC Tournament (0–0)
Date	Opponent	Rank	Site/stadium	Score	Win	Loss	Save	Attendance	Overall record	ACCT Record
May 27	vs. TBD		TBD							—
May 28	vs. TBD		TBD							—
May 29	vs. TBD		TBD							—

NCAA Columbia Regional (0–0)
Date	Opponent	Rank	Site/stadium	Score	Win	Loss	Save	Attendance	Overall record	NCCAT Record
June 4	at (2) No. 16 South Carolina; Regional First Round	(3)	Founders Park; Columbia, South Carolina	**L** 3–4	Bosnic (4–2)	**Abbott (8–6)**	Lloyd (2)	5,444	29–24	0–1
June 5	vs. (1) No. 11 Old Dominion or (4) Jacksonville; Regional Losers First Round	(3)	Founders Park							

=== Columbia Regional ===
Columbia Regional Teams
(1) Old Dominion Monarchs	(2) South Carolina Gamecocks	(3) Virginia Cavaliers	(4) Jacksonville Dolphins

First Round
1	**Old Dominion**	**4**
4	Jacksonville	3
3	Virginia	3
2	**South Carolina**	**4**
Lower round 1
4	Jacksonville	8
3	**Virginia**	**13**

Semi-Finals
1	**Old Dominion**	**2**
2	South Carolina	1
Lower final
2	South Carolina	2
3	**Virginia**	**3**

Finals
1	Old Dominion	3	3
3	**Virginia**	**8**	**4**^{10}

=== College World Series ===
2021 College World Series Teams
NC State Wolfpack	(9) Stanford Cardinal	(5) Arizona Wildcats	(4) Vanderbilt Commodores	Virginia Cavaliers	(3) Tennessee Volunteers	(7) Mississippi State Bulldogs	(2) Texas Longhorns

First round	Second round
**NC State**	**10**
9	Stanford	4
**NC State**	**1**
4	Vanderbilt	0
5	Arizona	6
4	**Vanderbilt**	**7**^{12}
Bracket 1
9	**Stanford**	**14**
5	Arizona	5
9	Stanford	5
4	**Vanderbilt**	**6**
3	Tennessee	0
**Virginia**	**6**
Virginia	5
7	**Mississippi State**	**6**
7	**Mississippi State**	**2**
2	Texas	1
Bracket 2
3	Tennessee	4
2	**Texas**	**8**
2	**Texas**	**6**
Virginia	2

Semifinals
NC State	1	–
4	**Vanderbilt**	**3**	– (Note: Game declared no contest due to COVID-19 protocols with NC State. Vanderbilt advanced in the tournament.)
7	**Mississippi State**	5	**4**
2	Texas	**8**	3

Finals
4	Vanderbilt	**8**	2	0
7	**Mississippi State**	2	**13**	**9**

== Rankings ==
Ranking movements Legend: ██ Increase in ranking ██ Decrease in ranking RV = Received votes
	Week																		
Poll	Pre	1	2	3	4	5	6	7	8	9	10	11	12	13	14	15	16	17	Final
Coaches'	14	14*	18	RV															
Baseball America	8	8	8	21															
Collegiate Baseball^	14	14	25	RV															
NCBWA†	15	12	17	25															
D1Baseball	16	12	16	RV															

^ Collegiate Baseball ranked 40 teams in their preseason poll, but only ranked 30 teams weekly during the season.
† NCBWA ranks 30 teams in their preseason poll, but only ranks 25 teams weekly during the season.
* A new poll was not released for this week, so for comparison purposes, the previous week's ranking is inserted in this week's slot.
