= 2021 Miami Hurricanes baseball team =

Baseball team season

2021 Miami Hurricanes baseball
- Conference: Atlantic Coast Conference

Ranking
- Coaches: No. 6
- CB: No. 6
- Record: 33–21 (20–15 ACC)
- Head coach: Gino DiMare (3rd season)
- Assistant coaches: J.D. Arteaga (19th season); Norberto Lopez (6th season); Matt Cleveland (2nd season)
- Home stadium: Alex Rodriguez Park at Mark Light Field

2021 Atlantic Coast Conference baseball standings
| | Conf. | | | | Overall |
| Team | W | | L | PCT | W | | L | PCT |
|---|---|---|---|---|---|---|---|---|
Atlantic
| No. 10 Notre Dame ^{x}‍‍‍^{y} | 25 | – | 10 | .714 | 34 | – | 13 | .723 |
| No. 4 NC State ‍‍‍^{y} | 19 | – | 14 | .576 | 37 | – | 19 | .661 |
| Florida State ‍‍‍^{y} | 20 | – | 16 | .556 | 31 | – | 24 | .564 |
| Louisville ‍‍‍ | 16 | – | 16 | .500 | 28 | – | 22 | .560 |
| Clemson ‍‍‍ | 16 | – | 20 | .444 | 25 | – | 27 | .481 |
| Wake Forest ‍‍‍ | 10 | – | 22 | .313 | 20 | – | 27 | .426 |
| Boston College ‍‍‍ | 10 | – | 23 | .303 | 21 | – | 28 | .429 |
Coastal
| Georgia Tech ^{x}‍‍‍^{y} | 21 | – | 15 | .583 | 31 | – | 25 | .554 |
| Miami (FL) ‍‍‍^{y} | 20 | – | 15 | .571 | 33 | – | 21 | .611 |
| Virginia ‍‍‍^{y} | 18 | – | 18 | .500 | 36 | – | 27 | .571 |
| North Carolina ‍‍‍^{y} | 18 | – | 18 | .500 | 28 | – | 27 | .509 |
| Duke ‍‍‡‍^{y} | 16 | – | 17 | .485 | 33 | – | 22 | .600 |
| Pittsburgh ‍‍‍ | 16 | – | 17 | .485 | 23 | – | 20 | .535 |
| Virginia Tech ‍‍‍ | 16 | – | 20 | .444 | 27 | – | 25 | .519 |
x – Division champion ‡ – Tournament champion y – Invited to the NCAA tournament As of July 1, 2021; Rankings from D1Baseball

The 2021 Miami Hurricanes baseball team represented the University of Miami during the 2021 NCAA Division I baseball season. The Hurricanes played their home games at Alex Rodriguez Park at Mark Light Field as a member of the Atlantic Coast Conference. They were led by head coach Gino DiMare, in his 3rd season at Miami.

== Previous season ==
The 2020 Miami Hurricanes baseball team notched a 12–4 (3–0) regular season record. The season prematurely ended on March 12, 2020, due to concerns over the COVID-19 pandemic.

== Game log ==
2021 Miami Hurricanes baseball game log
Legend: = Win = Loss = Canceled Bold = Miami team member * Non-conference game
Regular season (0–0)

February (0–0)
| Date | Time (ET) | TV | Opponent | Rank | Stadium | Score | Win | Loss | Save | Attendance | Overall | ACC | Sources |

March (0–0)
| Date | Time (ET) | TV | Opponent | Rank | Stadium | Score | Win | Loss | Save | Attendance | Overall | ACC | Sources |

April (0–0)
| Date | Time (ET) | TV | Opponent | Rank | Stadium | Score | Win | Loss | Save | Attendance | Overall | ACC | Sources |

May (0–0)
| Date | Time (ET) | TV | Opponent | Rank | Stadium | Score | Win | Loss | Save | Attendance | Overall | ACC | Sources |

Postseason (0–0)

ACC Tournament (0–0)
| Date | Time (ET) | TV | Opponent | Rank | Stadium | Score | Win | Loss | Save | Attendance | Overall | Postseason | Sources |

== 2021 MLB draft ==
| Player | Position | Round | Overall | MLB team |
|---|---|---|---|---|
| Adrian Del Castillo | C | 2 | 67 | Arizona Diamondbacks |
| Jake Smith | RHP | 6 | 171 | Los Angeles Angels |
| Anthony Villar | C | 15 | 460 | San Diego Padres |
