= 2021 Virginia Tech Hokies baseball team =

American college baseball season

2021 Virginia Tech Hokies baseball
- Conference: Atlantic Coast Conference
- Record: 27–25 (16–20 ACC)
- Head coach: John Szefc (4th season)
- Assistant coaches: Ryan Fecteau (4th season); Kurt Elbin (4th season); Tyler Hanson (3rd season)
- Home stadium: English Field

2021 Atlantic Coast Conference baseball standings
	Conf.				Overall
Team	W		L	PCT	W		L	PCT
Atlantic
No. 10 Notre Dame ^{x}‍‍‍^{y}	25	–	10	.714	34	–	13	.723
No. 4 NC State ‍‍‍^{y}	19	–	14	.576	37	–	19	.661
Florida State ‍‍‍^{y}	20	–	16	.556	31	–	24	.564
Louisville ‍‍‍	16	–	16	.500	28	–	22	.560
Clemson ‍‍‍	16	–	20	.444	25	–	27	.481
Wake Forest ‍‍‍	10	–	22	.313	20	–	27	.426
Boston College ‍‍‍	10	–	23	.303	21	–	28	.429
Coastal
Georgia Tech ^{x}‍‍‍^{y}	21	–	15	.583	31	–	25	.554
Miami (FL) ‍‍‍^{y}	20	–	15	.571	33	–	21	.611
Virginia ‍‍‍^{y}	18	–	18	.500	36	–	27	.571
North Carolina ‍‍‍^{y}	18	–	18	.500	28	–	27	.509
Duke ‍‍‡‍^{y}	16	–	17	.485	33	–	22	.600
Pittsburgh ‍‍‍	16	–	17	.485	23	–	20	.535
Virginia Tech ‍‍‍	16	–	20	.444	27	–	25	.519
x – Division champion ‡ – Tournament champion y – Invited to the NCAA tournament As of July 1, 2021; Rankings from D1Baseball

The 2021 Virginia Tech Hokies baseball team represented Virginia Tech during the 2021 NCAA Division I baseball season. The Hokies played their home games at English Field as a member of the Atlantic Coast Conference. They were led by head coach John Szefc, in his 4th season at Virginia Tech.

== Previous season ==
The 2020 Virginia Tech Hokies baseball team notched a 11–5 (1–2) regular season record. The season prematurely ended on March 12, 2020, due to concerns over the COVID-19 pandemic.

== Personnel ==
=== Roster ===
2021 Virginia Tech Hokies baseball roster
Pitchers: 3 - Chris Gerard- Sophomore; 10 - Nolan Wilson - (redshirt) Sophomore; 12 - Shane Connolly - Junior; 15 - Nic Psimas - Freshman; 16 - Matthew Siverling - Freshman; 18 - Xander Hamilton - Freshman; 20 - Grant Umberger - Freshman; 21 - Kyle McKernan - Freshman; 22 - Ryan Okuda - Junior; 25 - Samuel Rochard - Freshman; 27 - Noah Johnson - Freshman; 30 - Peyton Alford - Senior; 34 - Anthony Simonelli - Junior; 35 - Ryan Metz - Junior; 38 - Jaison Heard - Senior; 39 - Peter Sakellaris - Freshman; 40 - Henry Weycker - Freshman; 42 - Ryan Gleason - Freshman; 44 - Jackson Ritchey - Freshman; 45 - Christian Worley - Freshman; 46 - Griffin Green - Freshman; 47 - Jonah Hurney - Sophomore; 48 - Brady Kirtner - Freshman; 49 - Ethan Firoved - Freshman; 51 - Graham Firoved - Sophomore; 55 - Mike Grupé - Freshman; 56 - Jenner Kehe - Freshman	Catchers: 5 - Gehrig Ebel - Freshman; 17 - Cade Hunter - Freshman; 41 - Dayne Leonard - Freshman; Infielders: 2 - Sam Tackett - Freshman; 4 - Fritz Genther - Freshman; 7 - T. J. Rumfield - (redshirt) Freshman; 8 - Tanner Schobel - Freshman; 24 - Nick Biddison - Sophomore; 26 - Kevin Madden - Sophomore; 32 - Lucas Donlon - Freshman; 33 - Nick Holesa - Sophomore	Outfielders: 9 - Brennan Reback - Junior; 11 - Cade Swisher - Freshman; 23 - Tanner Thomas - Senior; 29 - Carson Jones - Freshman; 31 - Jack Hurley - Freshman; 37 - Jonah Seagears - Sophomore; 43 - Dusty Mercer - Freshman; 58 - Parker Stallard - Freshman; Utility: 19 - Gavin Cross - Freshman

=== Coaching staff ===
2021 Virginia Tech Hokies baseball coaching staff
Name	Position	Seasons at VT	Alma mater
John Szefc	Head coach	4	Drexel University (1989)
Ryan Fecteau	Assistant coach	4	Saint Anselm College (2005)
Kurt Elbin	Assistant coach	4	Lock Haven University (2006)
Tyler Hanson	Assistant coach	3	University of Maine at Farmington (2009)

== Game log ==
2021 Virginia Tech Hokies baseball game log
Legend: = Win = Loss = Canceled Bold = Virginia Tech team member * Non-conference game
Regular season (27–23)

February (5–1)
Date	Time (ET)	TV	Opponent	Rank	Stadium	Score	Win	Loss	Save	Attendance	Overall	ACC	Sources
February 21	11:05 am	ACCNX	Kent State*		English Field; Blacksburg, Virginia	**W** 3–1	**Gerard (1–0)**	Albright (0–1)	**Heard (1)**	203	1–0	—	Box Score; Recap
February 21	2:30 pm	ACCNX	Kent State*		English Field	**W** 9–2	**Simonelli (1–0)**	Romel (0–1)	**Connolly (1)**	203	2–0	—	Box Score; Recap
February 23	2:00 p.m.	ACCNX	Radford*; New River Valley rivalry		English Field	**W** 22–2	**Okuda (1–0)**	Bowes (0–1)	—	250	3–0	—	Box Score; Recap
February 26	7:00 p.m.	ACCN	at No. 6 Miami (FL)		Alex Rodriguez Park; Coral Gables, Florida	**W** 5–3	**Siverling (1–0)**	Federman (0–2)	**Connolly (2)**	623	4–0	1–0	Box Score; Recap
February 27	7:00 p.m.	ACCN	at No. 6 Miami (FL)		Alex Rodriguez Park	**L** 0–3	Rosario (1–0)	**Gerard (1–1)**	Palmquist (2)	652	4–1	1–1	Box Score; Recap
February 28	1:00 p.m.	ACCN	at No. 6 Miami (FL)		Alex Rodriguez Park	**W** 9–6	**Heard (1–0)**	Wanger (1–1)	**Connolly (3)**	634	5–1	2–1	Box Score; Recap

March (8–7)
Date	Time (ET)	TV	Opponent	Rank	Stadium	Score	Win	Loss	Save	Attendance	Overall	ACC	Sources
March 5	4:00 p.m.	ESPN+	No. 25 North Carolina	No. 24	English Field	**W** 10–6	**Okuda (2–0)**	Pry (0–1)	**Connolly (4)**	1,000	6–1	3–1	Box Score; Recap
March 6	3:00 p.m.	ACCN	No. 25 North Carolina	No. 24	English Field	**W** 6–4	**Firoved (1–0)**	Lancellotti (0–1)	**Siverling (1)**	1,000	7–1	4–1	Box Score; Recap
March 7	1:00 p.m.	ACCN	No. 25 North Carolina	No. 24	English Field	**L** 6–9	James (1–0)	**Johnson (0–1)**	—	1,000	7–2	4–2	Box Score; Recap
March 9	4:00 p.m.	ACCNX	VCU*	No. 18	English Field	**W** 10–9	**Siverling (2–0)**	Ward (0–1)	—	1,000	8–2	—	Box Score; Recap
March 10	3:00 p.m.	ACCNX	VCU*	No. 18	English Field	**L** 7–10	Davis (3–1)	**Ritchey (0–1)**	—	780	8–3	—	Box Score; Recap
March 12	4:00 p.m.	ACCN	Florida State	No. 18	English Field	**L** 4–6	Haney (1–0)	**Connolly (0–1)**	Hare (1)	739	8–4	4–3	Bos Score; Recap
March 13	3:00 p.m.	ACCN	Florida State	No. 18	English Field	**W** 5–0	**Gerard (2–1)**	Hubbart (2–2)	—	1,000	9–4	5–3	Box Score; Recap
March 14	1:00 p.m.	ACCNX	Florida State	No. 18	English Field	**L** 7–14	Grady (2–1)	**Metz (0–1)**	—	790	9–5	5–4	Box Score; Recap
March 16	4:00 p.m.	ACCNX	UNCG*	No. 25	English Field	**L** 2–7	Collins (2–0)	Okuda (2–1)	—	1,000	9–6	—	Box Score; Recap
March 19	6:00 p.m.	VTSN	at Clemson	No. 25	Doug Kingsmore Stadium; Clemson, South Carolina	**L** 2–8	Clark (1–0)	**Alford (0–1)**	—	1,280	9–7	5–5	Box Score; Recap
March 20	3:00 p.m.	VTSN	at Clemson	No. 25	Doug Kingsmore Stadium	**W** 11–3	**Heard (2–0)**	Olenchuk (1–3)	—	1,280	10–7	6–5	Box Score; Recap
March 21	1:00 p.m.	VTSN	at Clemson	No. 25	Doug Kingsmore Stadium	**L** 2–4	Gilbert (1–1)	**Johnson (0–2)**	—	1,280	10–8	6–6	Box Score; Recap
March 26	3:00 p.m.	VTSN	at No. 14 Pitt		Charles L. Cost Field; Pittsburgh, Pennsylvania	**W** 5–1	**Alford (1–1)**	Myers (2–3)	**Siverling (2)**	55	11–8	7–6	Box Score; Recap
March 27	3:00 p.m.	VTSN	at No. 14 Pitt		Charles L. Cost Field	**W** 8–4	**Simonelli (2–0)**	Gilbertson (3–3)	**Connolly (5)**	55	12–8	8–6	Box Score; Recap
March 28	1:00 p.m.	VTSN	at No. 14 Pitt		Charles L. Cost Field	**W** 8–4	**Siverling (3–0)**	McCrum (1–1)	—	55	13–8	9–6	Box Score; Recap

April (9–8)
Date	Time (ET)	TV	Opponent	Rank	Stadium	Score	Win	Loss	Save	Attendance	Overall	ACC	Sources
April 1	1:00 p.m.	ACCNX	Boston College	No. 23	English Field	**L** 3–7	Pelio (3–3)	**Alford (1–2)**	—	201	13–9	9–7	Box Score; Recap
April 2	6:00 p.m.	ACCNX	Boston College	No. 23	English Field	**W** 6–5	**Green (1–0)**	Gieg (0–2)	—	438	14–9	10–7	Box Score; Recap
April 3	1:00 p.m.	ACCNX	Boston College	No. 23	English Field	**W** 4–3	**Siverling (4–0)**	Vetrano (0–1)	**Firoved (1)**	967	15–9	11–7	Box Score; Recap
April 6	6:00 p.m.	VTSN	at ETSU*	No. 23	Thomas Stadium; Johnson City, Tennessee	**W** 15–5	**Sakellaris (1–0)**	Trusley (0–1)	—	761	16–9	—	Box Score; Recap
April 9	6:00 p.m.	VTSN	at Wake Forest	No. 23	David F. Couch Ballpark; Winston-Salem, North Carolina	**W** 8–4	**Heard (2–0)**	Cusick (1–2)	—	606	17–9	12–7	Box Score; Recap
April 10	4:00 p.m.	VTSN	at Wake Forest	No. 23	David F. Couch Ballpark	**W** 16–4	**Simonelli (3–0)**	Fleming (2–3)	—	558	18–9	13–7	Box Score; Recap
April 11	1:00 p.m.	VTSN	at Wake Forest	No. 23	David F. Couch Ballpark	**W** 10–9	**Connolly (1–1)**	Lowder (1–2)	**Firoved (2)**	521	19–9	14–7	Box Score; Recap
April 13	6:00 p.m.	VTSN	at Liberty*	No. 17	Liberty Baseball Stadium; Lynchburg, Virginia	**L** 2–8	Cumming (1–0)	**Okuda (2–2)**	Ellard (3)	598	19–10	—	Box Score; Recap
April 16	6:00 p.m.	ACCNX	Georgia Tech	No. 17	English Field	**L** 11–15	Bartnicki (1–1)	**Heard** (3–1)	—	731	19–11	14–8	Box Score; Recap
April 17	3:00 p.m.	ACCNX	Georgia Tech	No. 17	English Field	**W** 7–0	**Simonelli** (4–0)	Crawford (2–4)	**Firoved** (3)	1,000	20–11	15–8	Box Score; Recap
April 18	1:00 p.m.	ACCNX	Georgia Tech	No. 17	English Field	**L** 4–11	Maxwell (1–1)	**Heard** (3–2)	Grissom (1)	863	20–12	15–9	Box Score; Recap
April 20	6:00 p.m.	ACCNX	VMI*	No. 22	English Field	**W** 7–5	**Firoved** (2–0)	Jewell (1–5)	**Heard** (2)	1,000	21–12	—	Box Score; Recap
April 23	6:30 p.m.	VTSN	at NC State	No. 22	Doak Field; Raleigh, North Carolina	**L** 1–3	Highfill (4–2)	**Alford** (1–3)	Justice (3)	395	21–13	15–10	Box Score; Recap
April 25	12:00 p.m.	VTSN	at NC State	No. 22	Doak Field	**L** 3–11	Johnston (4–2)	**Simonelli** (4–1)	—	380	21–14	15–11	Box Score; Recap
April 25	4:00 p.m.	VTSN	at NC State	No. 22	Doak Field	**L** 6–7	Justice (3–2)	**Heard** (3–3)	—	481	21–15	15–12	Box Score; Recap
April 27	6:00 p.m.	ACCNX	ETSU*		English Field	**W** 12–0	**Green** (2–0)	Kirby (1–1)	—	1,000	22–15	—	Box Score; Recap
April 30	7:00 p.m.	ACCN	Virginia; Commonwealth Series		English Field	**L** 1–18	Abbott (5–5)	**Alford** (1–4)	—	1,000	22–16	15–13	Box Score; Recap

May (5–7)
Date	Time (ET)	TV	Opponent	Rank	Stadium	Score	Win	Loss	Save	Attendance	Overall	ACC	Sources
May 1	7:00 p.m.	ESPNU	Virginia; Commonwealth Series		English Field	**W** 6–3	**Simonelli** (5–1)	Vasil (6–4)	**Connolly** (6)	1,000	23–16	16–13	Box Score; Recap
May 2	6:00 p.m.	ACCN	Virginia; Commonwealth Series		English Field	**L** 1–6	Savino (2–2)	**Connolly** (1–2)	—	1,000	23–17	16–14	Box Score; Recap
May 5	3:00 p.m.	ACCNX	Georgetown*		English Field	**W** 6–2	**Green** (3–0)	Redfern (0–3)	—	1,000	24–17	—	Box Score; Recap
May 8	2:00 p.m.	ACCNX	Toledo*		English Field	**W** 7–1	**Alford** (2–4)	Schnitz-Paxton (5–1)	—		25–17	—	Box Score; Recap
May 8	6:00 p.m.	ACCNX	Toledo*		English Field	**W** 3–2	**Firoved** (3–0)	Power (2–3)	—	1,000	26–17	—	Box Score; Recap
May 9	2:00 p.m.	ACCN	Toledo*		English Field	**W** 16–5	**Connolly** (2–2)	Brandon (1–2)	—	1,000	27–17	—	Box Score; Recap
May 12			Liberty*	**Cancelled**									
May 14	6:00 p.m.	ACCNX	at Duke		Jack Coombs Field; Durham, North Carolina	**L** 6–11	Loper (1–1)	**Connolly** (2–3)	—		27–18	16–15	Box Score; Recap
May 15	1:00 p.m.	VTSN	at Duke		Jack Coombs Field	**L** 1–3	Loper (2–1)	**Siverling** (4–1)	Johnson (4)		27–19	16–16	Box Score; Recap
May 16	1:00 p.m.	ACCNX	at Duke		Jack Coombs Field	**L** 1–2	Dockman (1–1)	**Gerard** (2–2)	—		27–20	16–17	Box Score; Recap
May 20	6:00 p.m.	ACCNX	#8 Notre Dame		English Field	**L** 2–8	Bertrand (7–1)	**Alford** (2–5)	—	448	27–21	16–18	Box Score; Recap
May 21	6:00 p.m.	ACCNX	#8 Notre Dame		English Field	**L** 0–4	Tyrell (3–1)	**Simonelli** (5–2)	Brannigan (3)	664	27–22	16–19	Box Score; Recap
May 22	1:00 p.m.	ACCNX	#8 Notre Dame		English Field	**L** 1–7	Rao (2–1)	**Okuda** (2–3)	Mercer (2)	619	27–23	16–20	Box Score

Post-Season (0–2)

ACC Tournament (0–2)
Date	Time (ET)	TV	Opponent	Rank	Stadium	Score	Win	Loss	Save	Attendance	Overall	Postseason	Sources
May 25	3:00 p.m.	ACCRSN	vs. Virginia		Truist Field; Charlotte, North Carolina	**L** 2–3	Messinger (3–1)	**Alford** (2–6)	Whitten (1)	2,065	27–24	0–1	Box Score; Recap
May 26	3:00 p.m.	ACCRSN	vs. #7 Notre Dame		Truist Field	**L** 1–14	Mercer (3–2)	**Bertrand** (7–2)	—	3,020	27–25	0–2	Box Score; Recap

== Rankings ==
Ranking movements Legend: ██ Increase in ranking ██ Decrease in ranking — = Not ranked RV = Received votes
	Week																		
Poll	Pre	1	2	3	4	5	6	7	8	9	10	11	12	13	14	15	16	17	Final
Coaches'	22	22*	22	19	RV	RV	RV	25	19	22	RV	RV	RV	—	—	—	—	—	—
Baseball America	RV	RV	16	12	14	22	13	13	12	15	25								
Collegiate Baseball^	—	RV	27	22	RV	—	RV	RV	RV										
NCBWA†	RV	RV	28	24	RV	RV	30	26	20	29									
D1Baseball	RV	RV	24	18	25	RV	23	23	17	22									

^ Collegiate Baseball ranked 40 teams in their preseason poll, but only ranked 30 teams weekly during the season.
† NCBWA ranks 30 teams in their preseason poll, but only ranks 25 teams weekly during the season.
* A new poll was not released for this week, so for comparison purposes, the previous week's ranking is inserted in this week's slot.
