= 2021 North Carolina Tar Heels baseball team =

Baseball team season

2021 North Carolina Tar Heels baseball

NCAA Lubbock Regional, 1–2
- Conference: Atlantic Coast Conference
- Record: 28–27 (18–18 ACC)
- Head coach: Scott Forbes (1st season)
- Assistant coaches: Bryant Gaines (11th season); Jesse Wierzbicki (5th season); Jason Howell (1st season)
- Home stadium: Boshamer Stadium

2021 Atlantic Coast Conference baseball standings
	Conf.				Overall
Team	W		L	PCT	W		L	PCT
Atlantic
No. 10 Notre Dame ^{x}‍‍‍^{y}	25	–	10	.714	34	–	13	.723
No. 4 NC State ‍‍‍^{y}	19	–	14	.576	37	–	19	.661
Florida State ‍‍‍^{y}	20	–	16	.556	31	–	24	.564
Louisville ‍‍‍	16	–	16	.500	28	–	22	.560
Clemson ‍‍‍	16	–	20	.444	25	–	27	.481
Wake Forest ‍‍‍	10	–	22	.313	20	–	27	.426
Boston College ‍‍‍	10	–	23	.303	21	–	28	.429
Coastal
Georgia Tech ^{x}‍‍‍^{y}	21	–	15	.583	31	–	25	.554
Miami (FL) ‍‍‍^{y}	20	–	15	.571	33	–	21	.611
Virginia ‍‍‍^{y}	18	–	18	.500	36	–	27	.571
North Carolina ‍‍‍^{y}	18	–	18	.500	28	–	27	.509
Duke ‍‍‡‍^{y}	16	–	17	.485	33	–	22	.600
Pittsburgh ‍‍‍	16	–	17	.485	23	–	20	.535
Virginia Tech ‍‍‍	16	–	20	.444	27	–	25	.519
x – Division champion ‡ – Tournament champion y – Invited to the NCAA tournament As of July 1, 2021; Rankings from D1Baseball

The 2021 North Carolina Tar Heels baseball team represented University of North Carolina, Chapel Hill during the 2021 NCAA Division I baseball season. The Tar Heels played their home games at Boshamer Stadium as a member of the Atlantic Coast Conference. They were led by head coach Scott Forbes, in his first season at North Carolina.

== Previous season ==
The 2020 North Carolina Tar Heels baseball team notched a 12–7 (0–3) regular season record. The season prematurely ended on March 12, 2020, due to concerns over the COVID-19 pandemic.

== Game log ==
2021 North Carolina Tar Heels baseball game log
Legend: = Win = Loss = Canceled Bold = UNC team member * Non-conference game
Regular season (0–0)

February (0–0)
Date	Time (ET)	TV	Opponent	Rank	Stadium	Score	Win	Loss	Save	Attendance	Overall	ACC	Sources

March (0–0)
Date	Time (ET)	TV	Opponent	Rank	Stadium	Score	Win	Loss	Save	Attendance	Overall	ACC	Sources

April (0–0)
Date	Time (ET)	TV	Opponent	Rank	Stadium	Score	Win	Loss	Save	Attendance	Overall	ACC	Sources

May (0–0)
Date	Time (ET)	TV	Opponent	Rank	Stadium	Score	Win	Loss	Save	Attendance	Overall	ACC	Sources

Postseason (0–0)

ACC Tournament (0–0)
Date	Time (ET)	TV	Opponent	Rank	Stadium	Score	Win	Loss	Save	Attendance	Overall	Postseason	Sources
