= 2021 Atlantic Coast Conference baseball tournament =

American college baseball tournament

- Teams: 12
- Format: See below
- Finals site: Truist Field; Charlotte, North Carolina
- Champions: Duke (1st title)
- Winning coach: Chris Pollard (1st title)
- MVP: Joey Loperfido (Duke)
- Attendance: 58,516
- Television: ACCRSN (Tues-Sat); ACC Network (Semifinals); ESPN2 (Championship)

2021 Atlantic Coast Conference baseball standings
	Conf.				Overall
Team	W		L	PCT	W		L	PCT
Atlantic
No. 10 Notre Dame ^{x}‍‍‍^{y}	25	–	10	.714	34	–	13	.723
No. 4 NC State ‍‍‍^{y}	19	–	14	.576	37	–	19	.661
Florida State ‍‍‍^{y}	20	–	16	.556	31	–	24	.564
Louisville ‍‍‍	16	–	16	.500	28	–	22	.560
Clemson ‍‍‍	16	–	20	.444	25	–	27	.481
Wake Forest ‍‍‍	10	–	22	.313	20	–	27	.426
Boston College ‍‍‍	10	–	23	.303	21	–	28	.429
Coastal
Georgia Tech ^{x}‍‍‍^{y}	21	–	15	.583	31	–	25	.554
Miami (FL) ‍‍‍^{y}	20	–	15	.571	33	–	21	.611
Virginia ‍‍‍^{y}	18	–	18	.500	36	–	27	.571
North Carolina ‍‍‍^{y}	18	–	18	.500	28	–	27	.509
Duke ‍‍‡‍^{y}	16	–	17	.485	33	–	22	.600
Pittsburgh ‍‍‍	16	–	17	.485	23	–	20	.535
Virginia Tech ‍‍‍	16	–	20	.444	27	–	25	.519
x – Division champion ‡ – Tournament champion y – Invited to the NCAA tournament As of July 1, 2021; Rankings from D1Baseball

The 2021 Atlantic Coast Conference baseball tournament was held from May 25 through 30 at Truist Field in Charlotte, North Carolina. The annual tournament determined the conference champion of the Division I Atlantic Coast Conference for college baseball. Duke will receive the league's automatic bid to the 2021 NCAA Division I baseball tournament after defeating NC State in the Championship game.

The tournament has been held every year but two since 1973, with Clemson winning ten championships, the most all-time. Georgia Tech has won nine championships, and Florida State has won eight titles since their entry into the league in 1992. Charter league member Duke, along with recent entrants Virginia Tech, Boston College, Pittsburgh, Notre Dame and Louisville have never won the event.

== Format and seeding ==
The winner of each seven-team division and the top ten other teams based on conference winning percentage, regardless of division, from the conference's regular season were seeded one through twelve. Seeds one and two were awarded to the two division winners. Teams were then divided into four pools of three teams each, with the winners advancing to single elimination bracket for the championship.

If a 1–1 tie were to occur among all three teams in a pool, the highest seeded team will advance to the semifinals. Because of this, seeds 5–12 must win both pool play games to advance to the single-elimination bracket, and seeds 1–4 must only win the game against the first game winner. For example, if the 7 seed beats the 11 seed in the first game, then the winner of the 7 seed versus 2 seed advances to the semi-finals and the result of the 11 vs. 2 game would not determine further play.

Pool play is the official model of how the ACC tournament is played, but it can also be modeled as a single-elimination tournament. The tie-breaker described above is equivalent to a first round bye for the top four seeds. Seeds 5 through 12 play a first round game each, then the second round games between the first round winners and the top seeds determine who advances to the semi-finals. Games between the top seeds and the first round losers are also played but those are equivalent to consolation games that do not lead to further play.

The seeds were announced on May 22, after the conclusion of the regular season.

Team	W–L	Pct	GB #1	Seed
Atlantic Division
Notre Dame	25–10	.714	–	1
NC State	19–14	.576	5	3
Florida State	20–16	.556	5.5	5
Louisville	16–16	.500	7.5	7
Clemson	16–20	.444	9.5	11
Wake Forest	10–22	.313	13.5	–
Boston College	10–23	.303	14	–

Team	W–L	Pct	GB #1	Seed
Coastal Division
Georgia Tech	21–15	.583	4.5	2
Miami (FL)	20–15	.571	5	4
North Carolina	18–18	.500	7.5	6
Virginia	18–18	.500	7.5	8
Duke	16–17	.485	8	9
Pittsburgh	16–17	.485	8	10
Virginia Tech	16–20	.444	9.5	12

Tiebreakers
Teams	Record	Tiebreaker
(6) North Carolina (7) Louisville (8)Virginia	18–18; 16–16; 18–18	UNC 5–1; LOU 2–3; UVA 2–4
(9) Duke (10) Pittsburgh	16–17	DUKE vs. PITT, 2–1
(11) Clemson (12) Virginia Tech	16–20	CLEM vs. VT, 2–1

- Three-way tie broken by combined head-to-head records.
- Two-way tie broken by combined head-to-head records.

== Schedule and results ==
=== Schedule ===
Game	Time*	Matchup^{#}	Score	Television	Attendance	Reference
Tuesday, May 25
1	11:00 a.m.	No. 7 Louisville vs. No. 11 Clemson	15–10	ACCRSN	2,857	
2	3:00 p.m.	No. 8 Virginia vs. No. 12 Virginia Tech	3–2	ACCRSN	2,065	
3	7:00 p.m.	No. 6 North Carolina vs. No. 10 Pittsburgh	3–5	ACCRSN	3,235	
Wednesday, May 26
4	11:00 a.m.	No. 5 Florida State vs. No. 9 Duke	1–12	ACCRSN	1,219	
5	3:00 p.m.	No. 1 Notre Dame vs. No. 12 Virginia Tech	8–0	ACCRSN	3,020	
6	7:00 p.m.	No. 2 Georgia Tech vs. No. 11 Clemson	5–11	ACCRSN	3,915	
Thursday, May 27
7	11:00 a.m.	No. 4 Miami (FL) vs. No. 9 Duke	2–3	ACCRSN	2,914	
8	3:00 p.m.	No. 2 Georgia Tech vs. No. 7 Louisville	9–8 (12)	ACCRSN	3,002	
9	7:00 p.m.	No. 3 NC State vs. No. 10 Pittsburgh	3–2	ACCRSN	3,987	
Friday, May 28
10	11:00 a.m.	No. 1 Notre Dame vs. No. 8 Virginia	1–14	ACCRSN	3,655	
11	3:00 p.m.	No. 4 Miami (FL) vs. No. 5 Florida State	3–6	ACCRSN	3,655	
12	7:00 p.m.	No. 3 NC State vs. No. 6 North Carolina	6–9	ACCRSN	7,291	
Saturday, May 29
Semifinal 1	1:00 p.m.	No. 8 Virginia vs. No. 9 Duke	2–4	ACC Network	3,984	
Semifinal 2	5:00 p.m.	No. 2 Georgia Tech vs. No. 3 NC State	1–8	ACC Network	4,960	
Championship – Sunday, May 30
Championship	Noon	No. 3 NC State vs No. 9 Duke	0–1	ESPN2	7,162	
*Game times in EDT. # – Rankings denote tournament seed.

== Pool Play ==
=== Pool A ===
Pos	Team	Pld	W	L	RF	RA	RD	PCT	Qualification
1	Virginia	2	2	0	17	3	+14	1.000	Advance to Playoff round
2	Notre Dame	2	1	1	9	14	−5	.500	
3	Virginia Tech	2	0	2	2	11	−9	.000	

Source: ACC

=== Pool B ===
Pos	Team	Pld	W	L	RF	RA	RD	PCT	Qualification
1	Georgia Tech	2	1	1	14	19	−5	.500 (Note: Georgia Tech advances as the highest seed in the pool.)	Advance to Playoff round
2	Louisville	2	1	1	23	19	+4	.500	
3	Clemson	2	1	1	21	20	+1	.500	

Source: ACC

=== Pool C ===
Pos	Team	Pld	W	L	RF	RA	RD	PCT	Qualification
1	NC State	2	1	1	9	11	−2	.500 (Note: NC State advances as the highest seed in the pool.)	Advance to Playoff round
2	North Carolina	2	1	1	12	11	+1	.500	
3	Pittsburgh	2	1	1	7	6	+1	.500	

Source: ACC

=== Pool D ===
Pos	Team	Pld	W	L	RF	RA	RD	PCT	Qualification
1	Duke	2	2	0	15	3	+12	1.000	Advance to Playoff round
2	Florida State	2	1	1	7	15	−8	.500	
3	Miami	2	0	2	5	9	−4	.000	

Source: ACC

== Playoffs ==
Semifinals
8	Virginia	2
9	Duke	4
2	Georgia Tech	1
3	NC State	8

Finals
9	Duke	1
3	NC State	0

=== Championship Game ===
ACC Championship
(9) Duke Blue Devils	vs.	(3) NC State Wolfpack

May 30, 2021, 12:00 p.m. (EDT) at Truist Field in Charlotte, North Carolina
Team	1	2	3	4	5	6	7	8	9	R	H	E
(9) Duke	0	0	0	1	0	0	0	0	0	1	4	2
(3) NC State	0	0	0	0	0	0	0	0	0	0	5	0
WP: Stinson (3–3) LP: Willadsen (4–3) Sv: Johnson (7); Home runs: DUKE: None; NCSU: None; Attendance: 7,162; Boxscore

== All–Tournament Team ==
Position	Player	Team
C	Michael Rothenberg	Duke
1B	Alex Binelas	Louisville
2B	J.T. Jarrett	NC State
3B	Zack Gelof	Virginia
SS	Zack Prajzner	Notre Dame
OF	Bryce Teodosio	Clemson
OF	Tyler McDonough	NC State
OF	Joey Loperfido (MVP)	Duke
DH	Ben Metzinger	Louisville
P	Andrew Abbott	Virginia
P	Cooper Stinson	Duke
