= Frank Eck Stadium =

Baseball stadium in Notre Dame, Indiana

- The Eck
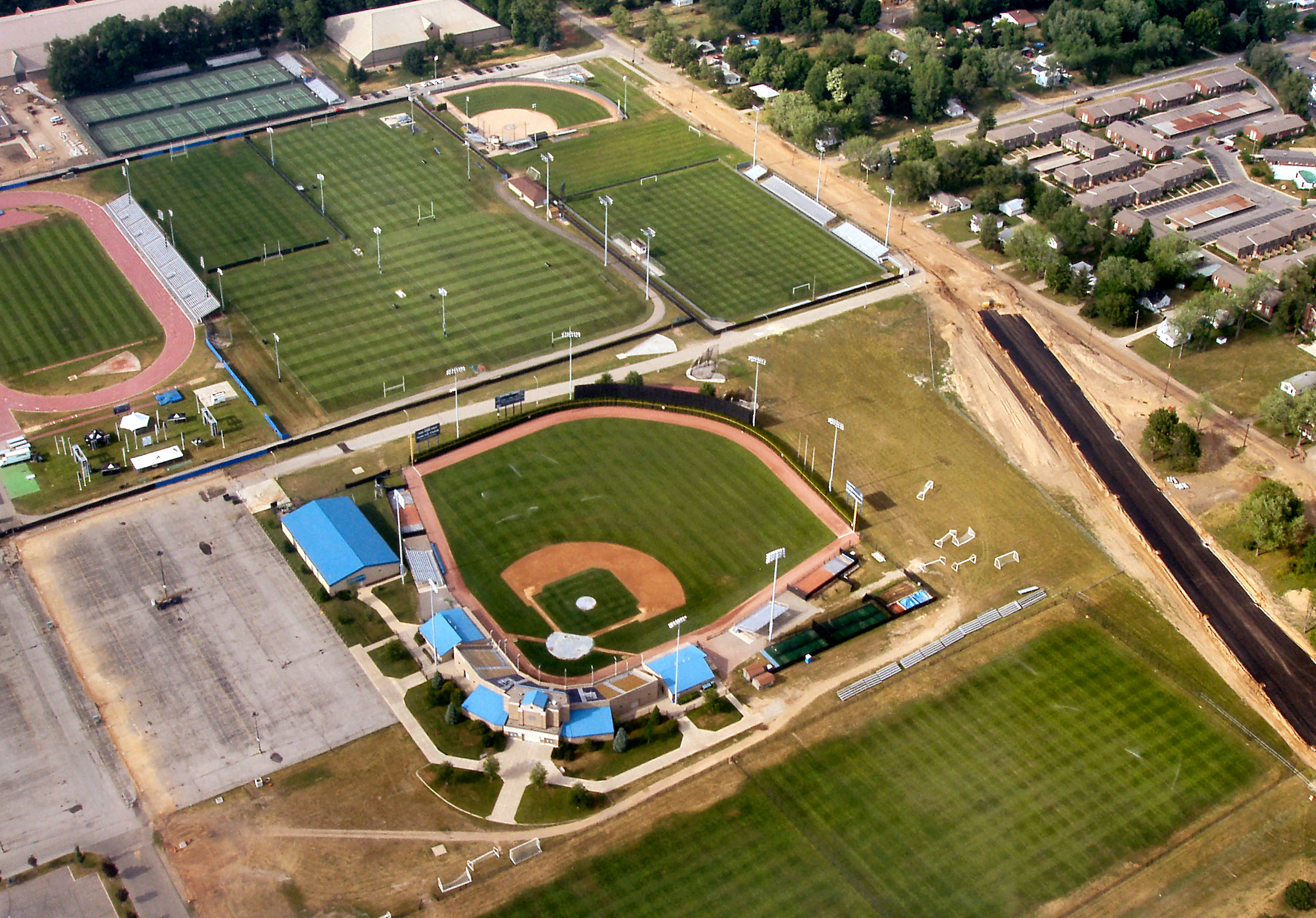
- Interactive map of Frank Eck Stadium
- Full name: Jake Kline Field at Frank Eck Stadium
- Location: Notre Dame, Indiana
- Coordinates: 41.696164°N 86.228192°W
- Capacity: 2,500
- Type: Stadium
- Event: Baseball
- Surface: Grass (1994–2013); FieldTurf (2014–present)
- Record attendance: 3,927 (April 21, 2007)
- Field size: Left field line – 330 ft (101 m); Left center – 380 ft (116 m); Center field – 400 ft (122 m); Right center – 380 ft (116 m); Right field line – 330 ft (101 m)

Construction
- Opened: March 17, 1994; 32 years ago
- Cost: $5.7 million

Tenants
- Notre Dame Fighting Irish baseball (1994–present); NCAA Regional: 1999, 2001

Frank Eck Stadium is a baseball stadium in Notre Dame, Indiana. It hosts the University of Notre Dame Fighting Irish college baseball team. The stadium holds 2,500 people and was built in 1994. The stadium was named after Frank Eck, an alumnus, benefactor and advisor to the university.

Since its construction, the stadium has hosted three NCAA Regionals, 1999, 2001 and 2021.

== History ==
In June 1991, the university announced a decision to build a new baseball stadium southeast of the Joyce Center. Frank Eck, a wealthy benefactor and alumnus of the university, helped subsidize the cost of the new stadium with a sizable contribution; the total cost of the new stadium would be $5.7 million. Due to the donation, the new stadium would be named after Eck.

Construction on the new stadium would finish in Spring 1994, with the Irish's first game in the stadium being held on March 30, with a 7–6 win against Indiana. Since its construction, Frank Eck Stadium has been renovated several times. These upgrades include, but are not limited to: a 9,000-square foot indoor hitting and pitching facility; a complete remodel of the locker rooms to include 36 brand new, 30-inch wood lockers, including four specially designed corner lockers for the catchers, as well as flat-screen, HD televisions and installation of FieldTurf for the entire field.

== Features ==
The facility has a clubhouse and locker room, training area and team rooms, indoor and outdoor hitting cages, turf field, press box, lights for night play, bench and stadium chair seating, entry plaza, concessions and restrooms.

== Attendance ==
Year	Total Yearly Attendance	Average Attendance
2010	20,621	1,085
2011	7,927	417
2012	9,724	540
2013	9,296	516
2014	8,948	406
2015	13,390	582
2016	17,987	580
2017	11,518	426

== See also ==
- List of NCAA Division I baseball venues
