= 2021 NCAA Division I baseball tournament =

American college sports championship

- Season: 2021
- Teams: 64
- Finals site: TD Ameritrade Park Omaha; Omaha, Nebraska
- Champions: Mississippi State (1st title)
- Runner-up: Vanderbilt (5th CWS Appearance)
- Winning coach: Chris Lemonis (1st title)
- MOP: Will Bednar (Mississippi State)

The 2021 NCAA Division I baseball tournament was the 74th edition of the NCAA Division I Baseball Championship. The 64-team tournament began on Friday, June 4, 2021, as part of the 2021 NCAA Division I baseball season and concluded with the 2021 College World Series in Omaha, Nebraska, which started on June 19 and ended on June 30. Mississippi State defeated Vanderbilt in the best-of-three final series to win their first national championship in program history.

The 64 participating NCAA Division I college baseball teams were selected out of an eligible 299 teams. There were 30 (Note: The Ivy League canceled its 2021 season, dropping the number of automatic bids from 31 to 30 for the 2021 tournament.) teams awarded an automatic bid as champions of their conferences, and 34 teams were selected at-large by the NCAA Division I Baseball Committee. Teams were divided into sixteen regionals of four teams, each of which conducted a double-elimination tournament. Regional champions then faced each other in Super Regionals, a best-of-three game series, to determine the eight participants in the College World Series.

Grand Canyon, NJIT, Norfolk State and Presbyterian made their NCAA tournament debuts after winning their first conference tournaments in program history. Nevada qualified for the tournament for the first time since 2000, Rider qualified for the first time since 2010 and Charlotte qualified for the first time since 2011. Auburn and Louisville were the lone teams from the 2019 College World Series field to fail to qualify.

== Tournament procedure ==
A total of 64 teams entered the tournament, with 30 of them (down from 31, due to the Ivy League having cancelled all spring sports due to COVID-19) receiving an automatic bid by winning their conference's tournament. The remaining 34 bids were at-large", with selections extended by the NCAA Selection Committee.

On Friday, May 14, the NCAA Selection Committee announced 20 potential sites for the first round regionals due to necessary coronavirus precautions, which were reduced to 16 on May 30. Typically, the top sixteen teams receive national seeds and host their respective regional tournaments. However, since the committee determined only twenty potential sites, if a team outside that list of twenty were to receive a national seed, they would play their regional on the road. This had not occurred since 2010 when No. 1 seed Florida State Seminoles traveled to the Norwich Regional hosted by UConn at Dodd Memorial Stadium. Despite receiving a national seed, Old Dominion travelled to Founders Park at the Columbia Regional hosted by the University of South Carolina.

== Schedule and venues ==
On May 30, the NCAA Division I Baseball Committee announced the sixteen regional host sites. The Southeastern Conference led the way with seven hosts. The Big 12 Conference and Pac-12 Conference each had three regional hosts, while Conference USA, Atlantic Coast Conference, and American Athletic Conference each had one regional host. Texas led all institutions as they hosted for the 28th time. Louisiana Tech hosted for the first time in program history.

The Super Regional sites were announced on the morning of Tuesday, June 8, after the completion of the regional round.

Regionals

- June 4–7
  - UFCU Disch–Falk Field, Austin, Texas, (Host: University of Texas at Austin)
  - Founders Park, Columbia, South Carolina, (Host: University of South Carolina)
  - PK Park, Eugene, Oregon (Host: University of Oregon)
  - Baum–Walker Stadium, Fayetteville, Arkansas (Host: University of Arkansas)
  - Lupton Stadium, Fort Worth, Texas, (Host: Texas Christian University)
  - Florida Ballpark, Gainesville, Florida, (Host: University of Florida)
  - Clark–LeClair Stadium, Greenville, North Carolina, (Host: East Carolina University)
  - Lindsey Nelson Stadium, Knoxville, Tennessee, (Host: University of Tennessee)
  - Dan Law Field at Rip Griffin Park, Lubbock, Texas, (Host: Texas Tech University)
  - Hawkins Field, Nashville, Tennessee, (Host: Vanderbilt University)
  - Swayze Field, Oxford, Mississippi, (Host: University of Mississippi)
  - J. C. Love Field at Pat Patterson Park, Ruston, Louisiana, (Host: Louisiana Tech University)
  - Frank Eck Stadium, South Bend, Indiana (Host: University of Notre Dame)
  - Klein Field at Sunken Diamond, Stanford, California (Host: Stanford University)
  - Dudy Noble Field, Polk–DeMent Stadium, Starkville, Mississippi, (Host: Mississippi State University)
  - Hi Corbett Field, Tucson, Arizona (Host: University of Arizona)

Super Regionals

- June 11–13
  - Baum–Walker Stadium, Fayetteville, Arkansas (Host: University of Arkansas)
  - Dan Law Field at Rip Griffin Park, Lubbock, Texas (Host: Texas Tech University)
  - Hi Corbett Field, Tucson, Arizona (Host: University of Arizona)
  - Hawkins Field, Nashville, Tennessee (Host: Vanderbilt University)
- June 12–14
  - UFCU Disch–Falk Field, Austin, Texas (Host: University of Texas at Austin)
  - Dudy Noble Field, Polk–DeMent Stadium, Starkville, Mississippi (Host: Mississippi State University)
  - Founders Park, Columbia, South Carolina (Host: University of South Carolina)
  - Lindsey Nelson Stadium, Knoxville, Tennessee (Host: University of Tennessee)

College World Series

- June 19–30
  - TD Ameritrade Park Omaha, Omaha, Nebraska, (Host: Creighton University)

== Bids ==
Of the 64 qualified to play in the 2021 NCAA Division I baseball tournament, 35 competed in the previous tournament in 2019. Grand Canyon, NJIT, Norfolk State and Presbyterian all made their NCAA tournament debuts after winning their first conference tournaments in program history. Nevada qualified for the tournament for the first time since 2000, Rider qualified for the first time since 2010 and Charlotte qualified for the first time since 2011.

Notable teams that failed to qualify included Auburn and Louisville, who both advanced to the 2019 College World Series.

School	Conference	Record (Conf)	Berth	Last NCAA Appearance
Alabama	SEC	31–24 (12–17)	At-large	2014 (Tallahassee Regional)
Arizona	Pac-12	40–15 (21–9)	Regular season	2017 (Lubbock Regional)
Arizona State	Pac-12	32–20 (16–14)	At-large	2019 (Baton Rouge Regional)
Arkansas	SEC	46–10 (22–8)	Tournament	2019 College World Series
Army West Point	Patriot	28–23 (15–10)	Tournament	2019 (Lubbock Regional)
Campbell	Big South	35–16 (28–9)	At-large	2019 (Greenville Regional)
Central Connecticut	Northeast	28–13 (21–9)	Tournament	2019 (Fayetteville Regional)
Central Michigan	Mid-American	40–16 (31–9)	Regular season	2019 (Starkville Regional)
Charlotte	Conference USA	39–19 (24–8)	At-large	2011 (Tempe Regional)
Dallas Baptist	Missouri Valley	37–15 (18–6)	Tournament	2019 (Lubbock Regional)
Duke	ACC	32–20 (16–17)	Tournament	2019 (Morgantown Regional)
East Carolina	American	41–15 (20–8)	At-large	2019 (Louisville Super Regional)
Fairfield	Metro Atlantic	37–3 (33–1)	At-large	2016 (Lubbock Regional)
Florida	SEC	38–20 (17–13)	At-large	2019 (Lubbock Regional)
Florida State	ACC	30–22 (20–16)	At-large	2019 College World Series
Georgia Tech	ACC	29–23 (21–15)	At-large	2019 (Atlanta Regional)
Gonzaga	West Coast	33–17 (20–7)	Regular season	2018 (Minneapolis Regional)
Grand Canyon	Western Athletic	39–19–1 (29–7)	Tournament	First appearance
Indiana State	Missouri Valley	30–19 (14–10)	At-large	2019 (Nashville Regional)
Jacksonville	ASUN	16–32 (4–15)	Tournament	2018 (Gainesville Regional)
Liberty	ASUN	39–14 (19–2)	At-large	2019 (Chapel Hill Regional)
Louisiana Tech	Conference USA	40–18 (22–8)	At-large	2016 (Starkville Regional)
LSU	SEC	34–22 (13–17)	At-large	2019 (Baton Rouge Super Regional)
Maryland	Big Ten	28–16 (28–16)	At-large	2017 (Winston-Salem Regional)
McNeese State	Southland	32–28 (21–18)	Tournament	2019 (Nashville Regional)
Miami (FL)	ACC	32–19 (20–15)	At-large	2019 (Starkville Regional)
Michigan	Big Ten	27–17 (27–17)	At-large	2019 College World Series Runner-up
Mississippi State	SEC	40–15 (20–10)	At-large	2019 College World Series
NC State	ACC	30–17 (19–14)	At-large	2019 (Greenville Regional)
Nebraska	Big Ten	31–12 (31–12)	Regular season	2019 (Oklahoma City Regional)
Nevada	Mountain West	25–18 (22–9)	Regular season	2000 (Palo Alto Regional)
NJIT	America East	26–22 (23–17)	Tournament	First appearance
Norfolk State	Mid-Eastern	25–26 (18–10)	Tournament	First appearance
North Carolina	ACC	27–25 (18–18)	At-large	2019 (Chapel Hill Super Regional)
North Dakota State	Summit	41–17 (20–11)	Tournament	2014 (Corvallis Regional)
Northeastern	Colonial	36–10 (20–3)	Tournament	2018 (Raleigh Regional)
Notre Dame	ACC	30–11 (25–10)	At-large	2015 (Champaign Regional)
Oklahoma State	Big 12	35–17–1 (12–12)	At-large	2019 (Lubbock Super Regional)
Old Dominion	Conference USA	42–14 (22–10)	Tournament	2014 (Columbia Regional)
Ole Miss	SEC	41–19 (18–12)	At-large	2019 (Fayetteville Super Regional)
Oregon	Pac-12	37–14 (20–10)	At-large	2015 (Springfield Regional)
Oregon State	Pac-12	34–22 (16–14)	At-large	2019 (Corvallis Regional)
Presbyterian	Big South	22–21 (18–16)	Tournament	First appearance
Rider	Metro Atlantic	23–16 (18–16)	Tournament	2010 (Austin Regional)
Samford	Southern	35–22 (20–10)	Tournament	2018 (Tallahassee Regional)
South Alabama	Sun Belt	33–20 (15–9)	Tournament	2017 (Hattiesburg Regional)
South Carolina	SEC	33–21 (16–14)	At-large	2018 (Fayetteville Super Regional)
South Florida	American	28–27 (14–14)	Tournament	2018 (DeLand Regional)
Southeast Missouri State	Ohio Valley	30–20 (17–10)	Tournament	2016 (Starkville Regional)
Southern	Southwestern Athletic	20–28 (13–11)	Tournament	2019 (Starkville Regional)
Southern Miss	Conference USA	37–19 (22–9)	At-large	2019 (Baton Rouge Regional)
Stanford	Pac-12	33–14 (17–10)	At-large	2019 (Starkville Super Regional)
TCU	Big 12	40–17 (17–7)	Tournament	2019 (Fayetteville Regional)
Tennessee	SEC	45–16 (20–10)	At-large	2019 (Chapel Hill Regional)
Texas	Big 12	42–15 (17–7)	At-large	2018 College World Series
Texas Tech	Big 12	36–15 (14–10)	At-large	2019 College World Series
UC Irvine	Big West	40–16 (32–8)	Regular season	2014 College World Series
UC Santa Barbara	Big West	39–18 (29–11)	At-large	2019 (Stanford Regional)
UCLA	Pac-12	35–18 (18–12)	At-large	2019 (Los Angeles Super Regional)
UConn	Big East	33–16 (13–4)	Tournament	2019 (Oklahoma City Regional)
Vanderbilt	SEC	40–15 (19–10)	At-large	2019 National champions
VCU	Atlantic 10	37–14 (13–3)	Tournament	2015 (Dallas Regional)
Virginia	ACC	29–23 (18–18)	At-large	2017 (Fort Worth Regional)
Wright State	Horizon	35–11 (28–4)	Tournament	2018 (Stanford Regional)

=== By conference ===
Conference	Total	Schools
SEC	9	Alabama, Arkansas, Florida, LSU, Mississippi State, Ole Miss, South Carolina, Tennessee, Vanderbilt
ACC	8	Duke, Florida State, Georgia Tech, Miami, NC State, North Carolina, Notre Dame, Virginia
Pac-12	6	Arizona, Arizona State, Oregon, Oregon State, Stanford, UCLA
Big 12	4	TCU, Texas, Texas Tech, Oklahoma State
Conference USA	4	Charlotte, Louisiana Tech, Old Dominion, Southern Miss
Big Ten	3	Maryland, Michigan, Nebraska
American	2	East Carolina, South Florida
ASUN	2	Liberty, Jacksonville
Big South	2	Campbell, Presbyterian
Big West	2	UC Irvine, UC Santa Barbara
Metro Atlantic	2	Fairfield, Rider
Missouri Valley	2	Dallas Baptist, Indiana State
America East	1	NJIT
Atlantic 10	1	VCU
Big East	1	UConn
Colonial	1	Northeastern
Horizon	1	Wright State
Mid-American	1	Central Michigan
Mid-Eastern	1	Norfolk State
Mountain West	1	Nevada
Northeast	1	Central Connecticut
Ohio Valley	1	Southeast Missouri State
Patriot	1	Army
Southern	1	Samford
Southland	1	McNeese State
Southwestern Athletic	1	Southern
Summit	1	North Dakota State
Sun Belt	1	South Alabama
West Coast	1	Gonzaga
Western Athletic	1	Grand Canyon

== National seeds ==
The sixteen national seeds were announced on the Selection Show on Monday, May 31 at 12 p.m. EDT on ESPN2. Teams in italics advanced to the Super Regionals. Teams in bold advanced to the 2021 College World Series.

1. Arkansas
2. **Texas**
3. **Tennessee**
4. **Vanderbilt**
5. **Arizona**
6. TCU
7. **Mississippi State**
8. Texas Tech
9. **Stanford**
10. Notre Dame
11. Old Dominion
12. Ole Miss
13. East Carolina
14. Oregon
15. Florida
16. Louisiana Tech

== Regionals and Super Regionals ==
Bold indicates winner. Seeds for regional tournaments indicate seeds within regional. Seeds for super regional tournaments indicate national seeds only.

=== Fayetteville Super Regional ===
Regional	Regional
1	**Arkansas**	**13**
4	NJIT	8
1	**Arkansas**	**5**
2	Nebraska	1
3	Northeastern	6
2	**Nebraska**	**8**
Fayetteville Regional – Baum–Walker Stadium
4	**NJIT**	**3**
3	Northeastern	2
4	NJIT	4
2	**Nebraska**	**18**
1	**Louisiana Tech**	**18**
4	Rider	2
1	Louisiana Tech	3
2	**NC State**	**8**
3	Alabama	1
2	**NC State**	**8**
Ruston Regional – J. C. Love Field at Pat Patterson Park
4	Rider	1
3	**Alabama**	**3**
3	Alabama	8
1	**Louisiana Tech**	**10**

Regional Final
1	**Arkansas**	3	**6**
2	Nebraska	**5**	2
2	**NC State**	**14**	–
1	Louisiana Tech	7	–

Super Regional
1	Arkansas	**21**	5	2
**NC State**	2	**6**	**3**

=== Lubbock Super Regional ===
Regional	Regional
1	**Texas Tech**	**6**
4	Army	3
1	**Texas Tech**	**7**
3	North Carolina	2
3	**North Carolina**	**5**
2	UCLA	4
Lubbock Regional – Dan Law Field at Rip Griffin Park
4	Army	6
2	**UCLA**	**13**
2	**UCLA**	**12**
3	North Carolina	2
1	**Stanford**	**9**
4	North Dakota State	1
1	**Stanford**	**12**
2	UC Irvine	4
3	Nevada	0
2	**UC Irvine**	**7**
Stanford Regional – Klein Field at Sunken Diamond
4	**North Dakota State**	**6**
3	Nevada	1
4	North Dakota State	3
2	**UC Irvine**	**18**

Regional Final
1	**Texas Tech**	**8**	–
2	UCLA	2	–
1	**Stanford**	4	**11**
2	UC Irvine	**8**	8

Super Regional
8	Texas Tech	3	0	–
9	**Stanford**	**15**	**9**	–

=== Tucson Super Regional ===
Regional	Regional
1	**Arizona**	**12**
4	Grand Canyon	6
1	**Arizona**	**4**
3	UC Santa Barbara	0
3	**UC Santa Barbara**	**14**
2	Oklahoma State	4
Tucson Regional – Hi Corbett Field
4	Grand Canyon	3
2	**Oklahoma State**	**5**
2	Oklahoma State	3
3	**UC Santa Barbara**	**13**
1	**Ole Miss**	**6**
4	Southeast Missouri State	3
1	**Ole Miss**	**4**
3	Florida State	3
3	**Florida State**	**5**
2	Southern Miss	2
Oxford Regional – Swayze Field
4	Southeast Missouri State	0
2	**Southern Miss**	**21**
2	**Southern Miss**	**7**
3	Florida State	4

Regional Final
1	**Arizona**	**5**	–
3	UC Santa Barbara	2	–
1	**Ole Miss**	7	**12**
2	Southern Miss	**10**	9

Super Regional
5	**Arizona**	**9**	3	**16**
12	Ole Miss	3	**12**	3

=== Nashville Super Regional ===
Regional	Regional
1	**Vanderbilt**	**10**
4	Presbyterian	0
1	**Vanderbilt**	**4**
2	Georgia Tech	3
3	Indiana State	6
2	**Georgia Tech**	**7**
Nashville Regional – Hawkins Field
4	Presbyterian	2
3	**Indiana State**	**9**
3	Indiana State	0
2	**Georgia Tech**	**9**
1	**East Carolina**	**8**
4	Norfolk State	5
1	**East Carolina**	**7**
2	Charlotte	5
3	Maryland	10
2	**Charlotte**	**13**
Greenville Regional – Clark–LeClair Stadium
4	Norfolk State	0
3	**Maryland**	**16**
3	**Maryland**	**2**
2	Charlotte	1

Regional Final
1	**Vanderbilt**	**14**	–
2	Georgia Tech	11^{11}	–
1	**East Carolina**	**9**	–
3	Maryland	6	–

Super Regional
4	**Vanderbilt**	**2**	**4**	–
13	East Carolina	0	1	–

=== Knoxville Super Regional ===
Regional	Regional
1	**Tennessee**	**9**
4	Wright State	8
1	**Tennessee**	**9**
3	Liberty	3
3	**Liberty**	**11**
2	Duke	6
Knoxville Regional – Lindsey Nelson Stadium
4	Wright State	6
2	**Duke**	**14**
2	Duke	4
3	**Liberty**	**15**
1	**Oregon**	**13**
4	Central Connecticut	10
1	**Oregon**	**7**
2	Gonzaga	3
3	LSU	0
2	**Gonzaga**	**3**
Eugene Regional – PK Park
4	Central Connecticut	5
3	**LSU**	**6**^{10}
3	**LSU**	**9**
2	Gonzaga	4

Regional Final
1	**Tennessee**	**3**	–
3	Liberty	1	–
1	Oregon	1	8
3	**LSU**	**4**	**9**

Super Regional
3	**Tennessee**	**4**	**15**	–
LSU	2	6	–

=== Columbia Super Regional ===
The Columbia Super Regional between Dallas Baptist and Virginia was held at Founders Park due to NCAA COVID-19 guidelines for the 2021 tournament mandating that all Super Regionals take place at one of the original sixteen regional sites regardless of the winners of those regionals.

Regional	Regional
1	**TCU**	**12**
4	McNeese State	4
1	TCU	6
3	**Dallas Baptist**	**8**
3	**Dallas Baptist**	**6**
2	Oregon State	5
Fort Worth Regional – Lupton Stadium
4	McNeese State	5
2	**Oregon State**	**10**
2	**Oregon State**	**3**
1	TCU	2
1	**Old Dominion**	**4**
4	Jacksonville	3
1	**Old Dominion**	**2**
2	South Carolina	1
3	Virginia	3
2	**South Carolina**	**4**
†Columbia Regional – Founders Park
4	Jacksonville	8
3	**Virginia**	**13**
3	**Virginia**	**3**
2	South Carolina	2

Regional Final
3	**Dallas Baptist**	4	**8**
2	Oregon State	**5**	5
1	Old Dominion	3	3
3	**Virginia**	**8**	**4**^{10}

Super Regional
Dallas Baptist	**6**	0	2
**Virginia**	5	**4**	**5**

†Old Dominion was unable to host at their home stadium, Bud Metheny Baseball Complex in Norfolk, Virginia, due to inadequate facilities according to NCAA regional hosting guidelines.

=== Starkville Super Regional ===
Regional	Regional
1	**Mississippi State**	**8**
4	Samford	4
1	**Mississippi State**	**16**
2	VCU	4
3	Campbell	4
2	**VCU**	**19**
Starkville Regional – Dudy Noble Field, Polk–DeMent Stadium
4	Samford	13
3	**Campbell**	**16**
3	**Campbell**	**19**
2	VCU	10
1	**Notre Dame**	**10**
4	Central Michigan	0
1	**Notre Dame**	**26**
2	UConn	3
3	Michigan	1
2	**UConn**	**6**
South Bend Regional – Frank Eck Stadium
4	**Central Michigan**	**8**
3	Michigan	2
4	**Central Michigan**	**14**
2	UConn	9

Regional Final
1	**Mississippi State**	**6**	–
3	Campbell	5	–
1	**Notre Dame**	**14**	–
4	Central Michigan	2	–

Super Regional
7	**Mississippi State**	**9**	1	**11**
10	Notre Dame	8	**9**	7

=== Austin Super Regional ===
Regional	Regional
1	**Texas**	**11**
4	Southern	0
1	**Texas**	**10**
2	Arizona State	3
3	Fairfield	6
2	**Arizona State**	**7**
Austin Regional – UFCU Disch–Falk Field
4	Southern	2
3	**Fairfield**	**6**
3	**Fairfield**	**9**
2	Arizona State	7
1	Florida	3
4	**South Florida**	**5**
4	**South Florida**	**10**
2	Miami (FL)	2
3	South Alabama	0
2	**Miami (FL)**	**1**
Gainesville Regional – Florida Ballpark
1	Florida	1
3	**South Alabama**	**19**
3	**South Alabama**	**7**
2	Miami (FL)	2

Regional Final
1	**Texas**	**12**	–
3	Fairfield	2	–
4	**South Florida**	0	**6**
3	South Alabama	**4**	4

Super Regional
2	**Texas**	**4**	**12**	–
South Florida	3	4	–

== College World Series ==
The College World Series was held at TD Ameritrade Park Omaha in Omaha, Nebraska.

=== Participants ===
School	Conference	Record (Conf)	Head coach	Super Regional	Previous CWS Appearances	CWS Best Finish	CWS W-L Record
NC State	ACC	35–18 (19–14)	Elliott Avent	Fayetteville	2 (last: 2013)	3rd (1968)	3–4
Stanford	Pac–12	38–15 (17–10)	David Esquer	Lubbock	16 (last: 2008)	1st (1987, 1988)	40–29
Arizona	Pac–12	45–16 (21–9)	Jay Johnson	Tucson	17 (last: 2016)	1st (1976, 1980, 1986, 2012)	43–30
Vanderbilt	SEC	45–15 (19–10)	Tim Corbin	Nashville	4 (last: 2019)	1st (2014, 2019)	16–7
Tennessee	SEC	50–16 (20–10)	Tony Vitello	Knoxville	4 (last: 2005)	2nd (1951)	8–8
Virginia	ACC	35–25 (18–18)	Brian O'Connor	Columbia	5 (last: 2015)	1st (2015)	12–8
Mississippi State	SEC	45–16 (20–10)	Chris Lemonis	Starkville	11 (last: 2019)	2nd (2013)	13–22
Texas	Big 12	47–15 (17–7)	David Pierce	Austin	36 (last: 2018)	1st (1949, 1950, 1975, 1983, 2002, 2005)	85–61

=== Bracket ===
First round	Second round
**NC State**	**10**
9	Stanford	4
**NC State**	**1**
4	Vanderbilt	0
5	Arizona	6
4	**Vanderbilt**	**7**^{12}
Bracket 1
9	**Stanford**	**14**
5	Arizona	5
9	Stanford	5
4	**Vanderbilt**	**6**
3	Tennessee	0
**Virginia**	**6**
Virginia	5
7	**Mississippi State**	**6**
7	**Mississippi State**	**2**
2	Texas	1
Bracket 2
3	Tennessee	4
2	**Texas**	**8**
2	**Texas**	**6**
Virginia	2

Semifinals
NC State	1	–
4	**Vanderbilt**	**3**	– (Note: Game declared no contest due to COVID-19 protocols with NC State. Vanderbilt advanced in the tournament.)
7	**Mississippi State**	5	**4**
2	Texas	**8**	3

Finals
4	Vanderbilt	**8**	2	0
7	**Mississippi State**	2	**13**	**9**

=== Bracket 1 ===
June 19, 2021; 1:10 pm CDT (UTC-5); Game 1	Stanford	**4–10**	**NC State**	TD Ameritrade Park Omaha; Attendance: 22,193
June 19, 2021; 1:10 pm CDT (UTC-5); Game 1	LP: Brandon Beck (9–2)	Boxscore	WP: Reid Johnston (9–3); Sv: Evan Justice (12)	TD Ameritrade Park Omaha; Attendance: 22,193

June 19, 2021; 6:09 pm CDT (UTC-5); Game 2	**Vanderbilt**	**7–6 (F/12)**	Arizona	TD Ameritrade Park Omaha; Attendance: 23,870
June 19, 2021; 6:09 pm CDT (UTC-5); Game 2	WP: Chris McElvain (5–1)	Boxscore	LP: Vince Vannelle (5–3)	TD Ameritrade Park Omaha; Attendance: 23,870

June 21, 2021; 1:08 pm CDT (UTC-5); Game 5	Arizona	**5–14**	**Stanford**	TD Ameritrade Park Omaha; Attendance: 19,341
June 21, 2021; 1:08 pm CDT (UTC-5); Game 5	LP: Garrett Irvin (6–3)	Boxscore	WP: Alex Williams (5–2); Sv: Jacob Palisch (2)	TD Ameritrade Park Omaha; Attendance: 19,341

June 21, 2021; 6:07 pm CDT (UTC-5); Game 6	**NC State**	**1–0**	Vanderbilt	TD Ameritrade Park Omaha; Attendance: 23,712
June 21, 2021; 6:07 pm CDT (UTC-5); Game 6	WP: Sam Highfill (9–2); Sv: Evan Justice (13)	Boxscore	LP: Jack Leiter (10–4)	TD Ameritrade Park Omaha; Attendance: 23,712

June 23, 2021; 6:08 pm CDT (UTC-5); Game 9	**Vanderbilt**	**6–5**	Stanford	TD Ameritrade Park Omaha; Attendance: 22,804
June 23, 2021; 6:08 pm CDT (UTC-5); Game 9	WP: Luke Murphy (4–1)	Boxscore	LP: Brandon Beck (9–3)	TD Ameritrade Park Omaha; Attendance: 22,804

June 25, 2021; 2:07 pm CDT (UTC-5); Game 11	NC State	**1–3**	**Vanderbilt**	TD Ameritrade Park Omaha; Attendance: 20,538
June 25, 2021; 2:07 pm CDT (UTC-5); Game 11	LP: Garrett Payne (0–1)	Boxscore	WP: Kumar Rocker (14–3); Sv: Luke Murphy (9)	TD Ameritrade Park Omaha; Attendance: 20,538

June 26, 2021; 1:07 pm CDT (UTC-5); Game 13	NC State	**WO**	**Vanderbilt**	TD Ameritrade Park Omaha

=== Bracket 2 ===
June 20, 2021; 1:09 pm CDT (UTC-5); Game 3	Tennessee	**0–6**	**Virginia**	TD Ameritrade Park Omaha; Attendance: 22,130
June 20, 2021; 1:09 pm CDT (UTC-5); Game 3	LP: Chad Dallas (11–2)	Boxscore	WP: Andrew Abbott (9–6); Sv: Matt Wyatt (1)	TD Ameritrade Park Omaha; Attendance: 22,130

June 20, 2021; 6:09 pm CDT (UTC-5); Game 4	Texas	**1–2**	**Mississippi State**	TD Ameritrade Park Omaha; Attendance: 23,885
June 20, 2021; 6:09 pm CDT (UTC-5); Game 4	LP: Ty Madden (7–5)	Boxscore	WP: Will Bednar (8–1); Sv: Landon Sims (11)	TD Ameritrade Park Omaha; Attendance: 23,885

June 22, 2021; 1:07 pm CDT (UTC-5); Game 7	**Texas**	**8–4**	Tennessee	TD Ameritrade Park Omaha; Attendance: 19,150
June 22, 2021; 1:07 pm CDT (UTC-5); Game 7	WP: Tanner Witt (5–0)	Boxscore	LP: Sean Hunley (7–5)	TD Ameritrade Park Omaha; Attendance: 19,150

June 22, 2021; 6:07 pm CDT (UTC-5); Game 8	Virginia	**5–6**	**Mississippi State**	TD Ameritrade Park Omaha; Attendance: 22,803
June 22, 2021; 6:07 pm CDT (UTC-5); Game 8	LP: Stephen Schoch (4–2)	Boxscore	WP: Cade Smith (3–0); Sv: Landon Sims (12)	TD Ameritrade Park Omaha; Attendance: 22,803

June 24, 2021; 6:07 pm CDT (UTC-5); Game 10	Virginia	**2–6**	**Texas**	TD Ameritrade Park Omaha; Attendance: 23,173
June 24, 2021; 6:07 pm CDT (UTC-5); Game 10	LP: Matt Wyatt (4–2)	Boxscore	WP: Cole Quintanilla (5–0; Sv: Aaron Nixon (9)	TD Ameritrade Park Omaha; Attendance: 23,173

June 25, 2021; 6:56 pm CDT (UTC-5); Game 12	Mississippi State	**5–8**	**Texas**	TD Ameritrade Park Omaha; Attendance: 24,003
June 25, 2021; 6:56 pm CDT (UTC-5); Game 12	LP: Brandon Smith (4–4)	Boxscore	WP: Aaron Nixon (4–3)	TD Ameritrade Park Omaha; Attendance: 24,003

June 26, 2021; 6:08 pm CDT (UTC-5); Game 14	**Mississippi State**	**4–3**	Texas	TD Ameritrade Park Omaha; Attendance: 21,883
June 26, 2021; 6:08 pm CDT (UTC-5); Game 14	WP: Landon Sims (5–0)	Boxscore	LP: Cole Quintanilla (5–1)	TD Ameritrade Park Omaha; Attendance: 21,883

=== Finals ===
Game 1

June 28, 2021 6:00 p.m. (CDT) at TD Ameritrade Park Omaha in Omaha, Nebraska
Team	1	2	3	4	5	6	7	8	9	R	H	E
Mississippi State	1	0	0	1	0	0	0	0	0	**2**	**5**	**0**
**Vanderbilt**	7	0	0	0	0	0	1	0	X	**8**	**5**	**0**
WP: Jack Leiter (11–4) LP: Christian MacLeod (6–6) Sv: Nick Maldonado (9); Home runs: MSU: Kamren James (12); VAN: Jayson Gonzalez (9); Attendance: 24,052; Boxscore

Game 2

June 29, 2021 6:00 p.m. (CDT) at TD Ameritrade Park Omaha in Omaha, Nebraska
Team	1	2	3	4	5	6	7	8	9	R	H	E
Vanderbilt	0	1	0	0	0	0	0	0	1	**2**	**4**	**3**
**Mississippi State**	1	0	4	1	2	0	5	0	X	**13**	**14**	**0**
WP: Preston Johnson (4–0) LP: Christian Little (3–2); Home runs: VAN: CJ Rodriguez (5), Maxwell Romero Jr. (4); MSU: None; Attendance: 24,122; Boxscore

Game 3

June 30, 2021 6:00 p.m. (CDT) at TD Ameritrade Park Omaha in Omaha, Nebraska
Team	1	2	3	4	5	6	7	8	9	R	H	E
**Mississippi State**	1	2	0	0	2	0	4	0	0	**9**	**12**	**0**
Vanderbilt	0	0	0	0	0	0	0	0	0	**0**	**1**	**3**
WP: Will Bednar (9–1) LP: Kumar Rocker (14–4) Sv: Landon Sims (13); Home runs: MSU: Kellum Clark (5), Logan Tanner (15); VAN: None; Attendance: 24,052; Boxscore

== Awards ==
The 2021 College World Series Most Outstanding Player was pitcher Will Bednar of Mississippi State. In addition to the Most Outstanding Player, an All-Tournament team was selected for the College World Series.

=== All-CWS Team ===
The following players were members of the College World Series All-Tournament Team.

Position	Player	School
P	**Will Bednar (MOP)**	Mississippi State
P	Jack Leiter	Vanderbilt
C	Logan Tanner	Mississippi State
1B	Luke Hancock	Mississippi State
2B	Tim Tawa	Stanford
3B	Zack Gelof	Virginia
SS	Lane Forsythe	Mississippi State
OF	Tanner Allen	Mississippi State
OF	Brock Jones	Stanford
OF	Rowdey Jordan	Mississippi State
DH	Ivan Melendez	Texas

== Final standings ==
Seeds listed below indicate national seeds only

Place	School	Record
1st	No. 7 Mississippi State	10–3
2nd	No. 4 Vanderbilt	9–3
3rd	No. 2 Texas	8–2
3rd	NC State	7–2
5th	No. 9 Stanford	6–3
5th	Virginia	7–4
7th	No. 3 Tennessee	5–2
7th	No. 5 Arizona	5–3
9th	No. 1 Arkansas	4–3
9th	Dallas Baptist	4–3
9th	No. 13 East Carolina	3–2
9th	LSU	4–3
9th	No. 10 Notre Dame	4–2
9th	No. 12 Ole Miss	4–3
9th	South Florida	3–3
9th	No. 8 Texas Tech	3–2
17th	Campbell	2–2
17th	Central Michigan	2–2
17th	Fairfield	2–2
17th	Georgia Tech	2–2
17th	Liberty	2–2
17th	No. 16 Louisiana Tech	2–2
17th	Maryland	2–2
17th	Nebraska	3–2
17th	No. 11 Old Dominion	2–2
17th	No. 14 Oregon	2–2
17th	Oregon State	3–2
17th	South Alabama	3–2
17th	Southern Miss	3–2
17th	UC Irvine	3–2
17th	UCLA	2–2
17th	UC Santa Barbara	2–2
33rd	Alabama	1–2
33rd	Arizona State	1–2
33rd	Charlotte	1–2
33rd	Duke	1–2
33rd	Florida State	1–2
33rd	Gonzaga	1–2
33rd	Indiana State	1–2
33rd	Miami (FL)	1–2
33rd	NJIT	1–2
33rd	North Carolina	1–2
33rd	North Dakota State	1–2
33rd	Oklahoma State	1–2
33rd	South Carolina	1–2
33rd	No. 6 TCU	1–2
33rd	UConn	1–2
33rd	VCU	1–2
49th	Army	0–2
49th	Central Connecticut	0–2
49th	No. 15 Florida	0–2
49th	Grand Canyon	0–2
49th	Jacksonville	0–2
49th	McNeese State	0–2
49th	Michigan	0–2
49th	Nevada	0–2
49th	Norfolk State	0–2
49th	Northeastern	0–2
49th	Presbyterian	0–2
49th	Rider	0–2
49th	Samford	0–2
49th	Southeast Missouri St	0–2
49th	Southern	0–2
49th	Wright State	0–2

== Record by conference ==
Conference	# of Bids	Record	Win %	Nc Record	Nc Win %	RF	SR	WS	NS	CS	NC
SEC	9	38–23	.623	33–18	.647	6	6	3	2^{†}	2	1
ACC	8	24–18	.571	24–18	.571	4	3	2	1^{†}	–	–
Big 12	4	13–8	.619	13–8	.619	2	2	1	1	–	–
Pac-12	6	19–14	.576	18–13	.581	5	2	2	–	–	–
American	2	6–5	.545	6–5	.545	2	2	–	–	–	–
Missouri Valley	2	5–5	.500	5–5	.500	1	1	–	–	–	–
Conference USA	4	8–8	.500	8–8	.500	3	–	–	–	–	–
Big Ten	3	5–6	.455	5–6	.455	2	–	–	–	–	–
Big West	2	5–4	.556	5–4	.556	2	–	–	–	–	–
ASUN	2	2–4	.333	2–4	.333	1	–	–	–	–	–
Big South	2	2–4	.333	2–4	.333	1	–	–	–	–	–
Metro Atlantic	2	2–4	.333	2–4	.333	1	–	–	–	–	–
Mid-American	1	2–2	.500	2–2	.500	1	–	–	–	–	–
Sun Belt	1	3–2	.600	3–2	.600	1	–	–	–	–	–
Other	16	5–32	.135	5–32	.135	–	–	–	–	–	–

^{†} Includes a game declared no-contest due to COVID-19 protocols with NC State. Vanderbilt advanced to the CWS Finals.

The columns RF, SR, WS, NS, CS, and NC respectively stand for the Regional Finals, Super Regionals, College World Series Teams, National Semifinals, Championship Series, and National Champion.

Nc is non–conference records, i.e., with the records of teams within the same conference having played each other removed.

== Media coverage ==
=== Radio ===
NRG Media provided nationwide radio coverage of the College World Series through its Omaha Station KOZN, in association with Westwood One. It also streamed all CWS games at westwoodonesports.com on Tunein and on SiriusXM. Kevin Kugler and John Bishop provided pxp on games leading up to the Championship Series. Bishop (Gms 6, 8–10, 12), Jeff Leise (Gms 2, 4–5), Damon Benning (Gms 1, 3, 7, 11), and Gary Sharp (Gms 13–14) provided the analysis. The Championship Series was called by Kugler and Scott Graham.

=== Television ===
ESPN aired every game from the Regionals, Super Regionals, and the College World Series across its networks.

==== Broadcast assignments ====
Regionals

- Bob Wischusen and Gregg Olson: Austin, Texas
- Mike Monaco and Gaby Sánchez: Columbia, South Carolina
- Clay Matvick and Ben McDonald: Eugene, Oregon
- Steve Lenox and Lance Cormier: Fayetteville, Arkansas
- Anish Shroff and Keith Moreland: Fort Worth, Texas
- Jon Meterparel and Nick Belmonte: Gainesville, Florida
- Chris Cotter and Danan Hughes: Greenville, North Carolina
- Mark Neely and Adam Greenberg: Knoxville, Tennessee
- Dave Neal and Chris Burke: Lubbock, Texas
- Mike Couzens and Greg Swindell: Nashville, Tennessee
- Tom Hart and Kyle Peterson: Oxford, Mississippi
- Sam Ravech and Roddy Jones: Ruston, Louisiana
- Mike Morgan and Todd Walker: South Bend, Indiana
- John Schriffen and Xavier Scruggs: Stanford, California
- Roy Philpott and Jay Walker: Starkville, Mississippi
- Roxy Bernstein and Wes Clements: Tucson, Arizona

Super Regionals

- Mike Monaco and Eduardo Pérez: Austin, Texas
- John Schriffen and Gaby Sánchez: Columbia, South Carolina
- Mike Morgan and Todd Walker: Fayetteville, Arkansas
- Tom Hart and Chris Burke: Knoxville, Tennessee
- Karl Ravech and Mike Rooney: Lubbock, Texas
- Clay Matvick and Ben McDonald: Nashville, Tennessee
- Dave Neal and Kyle Peterson: Starkville, Mississippi
- Roxy Bernstein and Wes Clements: Tucson, Arizona

College World Series

- Tom Hart, Chris Burke, Ben McDonald, and Kris Budden: Afternoons, Thursday night
- Karl Ravech, Eduardo Pérez, Kyle Peterson, and Kris Budden: Evenings minus Thursday

CWS Championship Series

- Karl Ravech, Eduardo Pérez, Kyle Peterson, and Kris Budden
