= 2021 Stanford Cardinal baseball team =

American college baseball season

2021 Stanford Cardinal baseball

NCAA Stanford Regional champion Lubbock Super Regional champion

College World Series Second Round
- Conference: Pac-12 Conference

Ranking
- Coaches: No. 9
- CB: No. 6
- Record: 39–17 (17–10 Pac-12)
- Head coach: David Esquer (4th season)
- Assistant coaches: Thomas Eager (4th season); Tommy Nicholson (4th season); Steve Rodriguez (2nd season)
- Home stadium: Klein Field at Sunken Diamond

2021 Pac-12 Conference baseball standings
	Conf.				Overall
Team	W		L	PCT	W		L	PCT
No. 5 Arizona ‍†‍‍^{y}	21	–	9	.700	45	–	18	.714
No. 10 Oregon ‍‍‍^{y}	20	–	10	.667	39	–	16	.709
No. 7 Stanford ‍‍‍^{y}	17	–	10	.630	39	–	17	.696
No. 21 UCLA ‍‍‍^{y}	18	–	12	.600	37	–	20	.649
Arizona State ‍‍‍^{y}	16	–	14	.533	33	–	22	.600
Oregon State ‍‍‍^{y}	16	–	14	.533	37	–	24	.607
California ‍‍‍	15	–	15	.500	29	–	26	.527
Washington State ‍‍‍	13	–	17	.433	26	–	23	.531
USC ‍‍‍	13	–	17	.433	25	–	26	.490
Utah ‍‍‍	7	–	23	.233	17	–	33	.340
Washington ‍‍‍	6	–	21	.222	20	–	30	.400
† – Conference champion y – Invited to the NCAA tournament As of June 23, 2021; Rankings from D1Baseball

The 2021 Stanford Cardinal baseball team represented Stanford University in the 2021 NCAA Division I baseball season. The Cardinal played their home games at Klein Field at Sunken Diamond under fourth year coach David Esquer.

== Previous season ==
The Cardinal started the 2020 season losing eight of their first ten games and went 5–11 before the season was canceled due the COVID-19 pandemic.

=== 2020 MLB draft ===
The Cardinal had no players drafted in the 2020 MLB draft.

== Personnel ==
=== Roster ===
2021 Stanford Cardinal roster
Pitchers: 13 - Justin Moore - (redshirt) Sophomore; 18 - Cody Jensen - Junior; 20 - Brendan Beck - Senior; 26 - Quinn Mathews - Sophomore; 28 - Alex Williams - Junior; 30 - Zach Grech - Senior (5th Year); 34 - Ryan Bruno - Freshman; 36 - Jonathan Worley - (redshirt) Senior; 37 - Tommy O'Rourke - Freshman; 38 - Nathan Fleischli - Sophomore; 39 - Jacob Palisch - Senior; 40 - Nicolas Lopez - Junior; 41 - Matt Swartz - Sophomore; 42 - Austin Weiermiller - Senior; 43 - Brandt Pancer - Freshman; 45 - Max Meier - Sophomore; 46 - Jaden Bruno - Freshman; 49 - Drew Dowd - Freshman	Catchers: 11 - Alberto Rios - Freshman; 16 - Vincent Martinez - Junior; Infielders: 1 - Owen Cobb - Sophomore; 2 - Drew Bowser - Freshman; 4 - Carson Greene - Sophomore; 5 - Austin Kretzschmar - Junior; 6 - Zach Sehgal - (redshirt) Junior; 10 - Adam Crampton - Sophomore; 24 - Nick Brueser - Senior; 31 - Carter Graham - 'Freshman; 33 - Brett Barrera - Sophomore	Outfielders: 7 - Brock Jones - Sophomore; 14 - Eddie Park - Freshman; 15 - Grant Burton - Junior; 44 - Christian Robinson - Senior; Utility: 12 - Tommy Troy (INF/OF) - Freshman; 19 - Henry Gargus (INF/OF) - Sophomore; 21 - Tim Tawa - Junior; 23 - Joey Dixon - (P/INF) Freshman; 25 - Kody Huff (C/INF) - Sophomore; 29 - Cole Hinkleman (OF/INF) - Sophomore

=== Coaching staff ===
2021 Stanford Cardinal coaching staff
Name	Position
David Esquer	Clarke and Elizabeth Nelson Director of Baseball
Thomas Eager	Assistant Coach
Tommy Nicholson	Assistant Coach
Steve Rodriguez	Assistant Coach
Jeanette Morganti	Director of Baseball Operations
Sky Valenzuela	Video Coordinator

== Schedule and results ==
Legend
	Stanford win
	Stanford loss
	Postponement
**Bold**	Stanford team member

2021 Stanford Cardinal baseball game log
Regular season (33–14)

February (3–1)
Date	Opponent	Rank	Site/stadium	Score	Win	Loss	Save	TV	Attendance	Overall record	Pac-12 Record
Feb. 25	Santa Clara*		Klein Field at Sunken Diamond • Stanford, CA	**W** 10–7	**Beck** (1–0)	Grant (0–1)	**Grech** (1)	Stanford Live Stream 2		1–0	-
Feb. 26	at Santa Clara*		Stephen Schott Stadium • Santa Clara, CA	**W** 8–0	**Mathews** (1–0)	Erlandson (0–1)				2–0	-
Feb. 27	Santa Clara*		Klein Field at Sunken Diamond • Stanford, CA	**W** 10–6	**Grech** (1–0)	Howard (0–1)		Stanford Live Stream 2		3–0	-
Feb. 28	at Santa Clara*		Stephen Schott Stadium • Santa Clara, CA	**L** 0–13	Buckley (1–0)	**Bruno** (0–1)				3–1	-

March (11–3)
Date	Opponent	Rank	Site/stadium	Score	Win	Loss	Save	TV	Attendance	Overall record	Pac-12 Record
Mar. 4	San Francisco*		Klein Field at Sunken Diamond • Stanford, CA	**W** 7–6^{10}	**Grech** (2–0)	Pham (0–2)		Stanford Live Stream 2		4–1	-
Mar. 5	San Francisco*		Klein Field at Sunken Diamond • Stanford, CA	**W** 3–2	**Weiermiller** (1–0)	Bourassa (1–1)		Stanford Live Stream 2		5–1	-
Mar. 6	at San Francisco*		Dante Benedetti Diamond at Max Ulrich Field • San Francisco, CA	**W** 10–6	**Pancer** (1–0)	Meisner (0–1)	**Grech** (2)			6–1	-
Mar. 7	at San Francisco*		Dante Benedetti Diamond at Max Ulrich Field • San Francisco, CA	**W** 15–13	**Worley** (1–0)	Barron (0–1)	**Grech** (3)			7–1	-
Mar. 12	UC Irvine*		Klein Field at Sunken Diamond • Stanford, CA	**W** 4–1	**Beck** (2–0)	Denholm (0–1)	**Grech** (4)	Stanford Live Stream 2		8–1	-
Mar. 13	UC Irvine*		Klein Field at Sunken Diamond • Stanford, CA	**W** 6–1	**Mathews** (2–0)	Ibarra (1–2)		Stanford Live Stream		9–1	-
Mar. 13	UC Irvine*		Klein Field at Sunken Diamond • Stanford, CA	**L** 1–5	Frias (2–0)	**Dowd** (0–1)		Stanford Live Stream		9–2	-
Mar. 14	UC Irvine*		Klein Field at Sunken Diamond • Stanford, CA	**W** 8–6	**Pancer** (2–0)	Wentworth (0–1)	**Grech** (5)	Stanford Live Stream		10–2	-
Mar. 19	Utah		Klein Field at Sunken Diamond • Stanford, CA	**W** 4–2	**Beck** (3–0)	MacIver (0–1)	**Grech** (6)	Stanford Live Stream 2		11–2	1–0
Mar. 20	Utah		Klein Field at Sunken Diamond • Stanford, CA	**L** 4–8	Hostert (1–0)	**Pancer** (2–1)		Stanford Live Stream 2		11–3	1-1
Mar. 21	Utah		Klein Field at Sunken Diamond • Stanford, CA	**W** 4–1	**Pancer** (3–1)	Watson (0–3)	**Grech** (7)	Stanford Live Stream 2		12–3	2–1
Mar. 26	Cal State Bakersfield*		Klein Field at Sunken Diamond • Stanford, CA	–	(–)	(–)		Stanford Live Stream 2		–	-
Mar. 27	Fresno State*		Klein Field at Sunken Diamond • Stanford, CA	**W** 12–4	**Mathews** (3–0)	Kendrick (0–1)		Stanford Live Stream		13–3	-
Mar. 27	Cal State Bakersfield*		Klein Field at Sunken Diamond • Stanford, CA	–	(–)	(–)		Stanford Live Stream		–	-
Mar. 28	Fresno State*		Klein Field at Sunken Diamond • Stanford, CA	**W** 11–8	**Grech** (3–0)	Peters (1–1)		Stanford Live Stream		14–3	-
Mar. 28	Cal State Bakersfield*		Klein Field at Sunken Diamond • Stanford, CA	–	(–)	(–)		Stanford Live Stream		–	-
Mar. 29	at Sacramento State*		John Smith Field • Sacramento, CA	**L** 2–3	Zalasky (3–0)	**Grech** (3–1)		WAC Digital Network	15	14–4	-

April (9–4)
Date	Opponent	Rank	Site/stadium	Score	Win	Loss	Save	TV	Attendance	Overall record	Pac-12 Record
Apr. 1	at Washington State		Bailey–Brayton Field • Pullman, WA	**W** 18–3	**Beck** (4–0)	White (3–2)		PAC12N		15–4	3–1
Apr. 2	at Washington State		Bailey–Brayton Field • Pullman, WA	**W** 7–5	**Grech** (4–1)	Hawkins (1–4)		PAC12N		16–4	4–1
Apr. 3	at Washington State		Bailey–Brayton Field • Pullman, WA	**L** 9–10^{10}	Sierra (2–1)	**Grech** (4–2)		PAC12N		16–5	4–2
Apr. 6	California*		Klein Field at Sunken Diamond • Stanford, CA	**W** 4–3	**Weiermiller** (2–0)	Villers (0–1)	**Grech** (8)	Stanford Live Stream	72	17–5	-
Apr. 9	No. 21 UCLA		Klein Field at Sunken Diamond • Stanford, CA	**W** 6–2	**Beck** (5–0)	Pettway (0–2)	**Grech** (9)	Stanford Live Stream 3	136	18–5	5–2
Apr. 10	No. 21 UCLA		Klein Field at Sunken Diamond • Stanford, CA	**W** 11–6	**Pancer** (4–1)	Bergin (3–2)		Stanford Live Stream 3	160	19–5	6–2
Apr. 11	No. 21 UCLA		Klein Field at Sunken Diamond • Stanford, CA	**L** 1–6	Mullen (6–1)	**Williams** (0–1)		Stanford Live Stream 2	155	19–6	6–3
Apr. 14	Pacific*	No. 20	Klein Field at Sunken Diamond • Stanford, CA	**W** 2–0	**Dixon** (1–0)	Hayes (0–4)	**Grech** (10)	Stanford Live Stream	140	20–6	-
Apr. 16	at Arizona State	No. 20	Phoenix Municipal Stadium • Phoenix, AZ	**L** 5–9	Dennie (2–1)	**Grech** (4–3)		ASU Live Stream-3	1,739	20–7	6–4
Apr. 17	at Arizona State	No. 20	Phoenix Municipal Stadium • Phoenix, AZ	**W** 11–9^{12}	**O'Rourke** (1–0)	Levine (3–2)	**Grech** (11)	ASU Live Stream-3	1,838	21–7	7–4
Apr. 18	at Arizona State	No. 20	Phoenix Municipal Stadium • Phoenix, AZ	**W** 13–5	**Dowd** (1–1)	Thornton (1–2)	**Dixon** (1)	ASU Live Stream-3	1,657	22–7	8–4
Apr. 23	Washington	No. 17	Klein Field at Sunken Diamond • Stanford, CA					Stanford Live Stream			-
Apr. 24	Washington	No. 17	Klein Field at Sunken Diamond • Stanford, CA					Stanford Live Stream			-
Apr. 25	Washington	No. 17	Klein Field at Sunken Diamond • Stanford, CA					Stanford Live Stream			-
Apr. 28	at Pacific*	No. 18	Klein Family Field • Stockton, CA; Rescheduled from May 21	**L** 12–15	Swanson (2–2)	**Grech** (4–4)			60	–	-
Apr. 30	at USC	No. 18	Dedeaux Field • Los Angeles, CA	**W** 5–2^{10}	**Palisch** (1–0)	Clarke (3–1)	**Grech** (12)	USC Live Stream	159	23–8	9–4

May (10–6)
Date	Opponent	Rank	Site/stadium	Score	Win	Loss	Save	TV	Attendance	Overall record	Pac-12 Record
May 1	at USC	No. 18	Dedeaux Field • Los Angeles, CA	**W** 3–2	**Mathews** (4–0)	Champlain (2–4)	**Grech** (13)	USC Live Stream	197	24–8	10–4
May 2	at USC	No. 18	Dedeaux Field • Los Angeles, CA	**L** 1–2	Cornwell (5–4)	**Pancer** (4–2)	Clow (4)	USC Live Stream	185	24–9	10–5
May 7	No. 9 Arizona	No. 16	Klein Field at Sunken Diamond • Stanford, CA	**W** 5–4^{13}	**Pancer** (5–2)	Flanagan (0–3)		Stanford Live Stream	523	25–9	11–5
May 8	No. 9 Arizona	No. 16	Klein Field at Sunken Diamond • Stanford, CA	**L** 2–20	Irvin (4–1)	**Mathews** (4–1)		Stanford Live Stream	315	25–10	11–6
May 9	No. 9 Arizona	No. 16	Klein Field at Sunken Diamond • Stanford, CA	**W** 8–2	**Williams** (1–1)	Smith (2–1)		Stanford Live Stream	327	26–10	12–6
May 11	San Jose State	No. 12	Klein Field at Sunken Diamond • Stanford, CA	**W** 8–7	**Dowd** (2–1)	Jansen (1–1)		Stanford Live Stream	288	27–10	-
May 14	at California	No. 12	Evans Diamond • Berkeley, CA	**W** 9–2	**Beck** (6–0)	White (4–2)		Cal Live Stream-2		28–10	13–6
May 15	at California	No. 12	Evans Diamond • Berkeley, CA	**L** 4–5	Stoutenborough (1–2)	**Grech** (4–5)		Cal Live Stream-2		28–11	13–7
May 16	at California	No. 12	Evans Diamond • Berkeley, CA	**L** 5–9	Holman (1–2)	**Mathews** (4–2)	Scott (2)	Cal Live Stream-2		28–12	13–8
May 17	California*	No. 15	Klein Field at Sunken Diamond • Stanford, CA	**W** 7–6^{12}	**Palisch** (2–0)	Lake (0–1)		Stanford Live Stream	422	29–12	–
May 21	at No. 6 Oregon	No. 15	PK Park • Eugene, OR	**L** 1–2	Ahlstrom (7–3)	**Beck** (6–1)	Somers (10)	PAC12N	641	29–13	13–9
May 22	at No. 6 Oregon	No. 15	PK Park • Eugene, OR	**W** 6–5	**Williams** (2–1)	Kafka (5–3)	**Dixon** (2)	PAC12N	641	30–13	14–9
May 23	at No. 6 Oregon	No. 15	PK Park • Eugene, OR	**W** 8–5^{12}	**Dixon** (2–0)	Somers (1–1)		PAC12N	641	31–13	15–9
May 27	Oregon State	No. 9	Klein Field at Sunken Diamond • Stanford, CA	**W** 1–0	**Beck** (7–1)	Abel (3–4)		PAC12N	486	32–13	16–9
May 28	Oregon State	No. 9	Klein Field at Sunken Diamond • Stanford, CA	**W** 5–0	**Grech** (5–5)	Hjerpe (3–6)		PAC12N	517	33–13	17–9
May 29	Oregon State	No. 9	Klein Field at Sunken Diamond • Stanford, CA	**L** 1–9	Pfennings (5–0)	**Williams** (2–2)		PAC12N	516	33–14	17–10

Postseason (6–2)

Stanford Regional (3–1)
Date	Opponent	Rank	Site/stadium	Score	Win	Loss	Save	TV	Attendance	Overall record	Regional Record
June 4	(4) North Dakota State	No. 7 (1)	Klein Field at Sunken Diamond • Stanford, CA	**W** 9–1	**Williams** (3–2)	Loven (3–3)		ESPN3	559	34–14	1–0
June 5	(2) No. 17 UC Irvine	No. 7 (1)	Klein Field at Sunken Diamond • Stanford, CA	**W** 12–4	**Beck** (8–1)	Pinto (7–4)		ESPN3	560	35–14	2–0
June 6	(2) at No. 17 UC Irvine	No. 7 (1)	Klein Field at Sunken Diamond • Stanford, CA	**L** 4–8	King (3–1)	**Dixon** (2–1)		ESPN3	593	35–15	2–1
June 7	(2) at No. 17 UC Irvine	No. 7 (1)	Klein Field at Sunken Diamond • Stanford, CA	**W** 11–8	**Mathews** (5–2)	Frias (9–2)	**Palisch** (1)	ESPNU	593	36–15	3–1

Lubbock Super Regional (2–0)
Date	Opponent	Rank	Site/stadium	Score	Win	Loss	Save	TV	Attendance	Overall record	Regional Record
June 11	at (1) No. 9 Texas Tech	No. 7 (1)	Dan Law Field at Rip Griffin Park • Lubbock, TX	**W** 15–3	**Beck** (9–1)	Hampton (4–1)		ESPNU	4,732	37–15	1–0
June 12	at (1) No. 9 Texas Tech	No. 7 (1)	Dan Law Field at Rip Griffin Park • Lubbock, TX	**W** 9–2	**Williams** (4–2)	Montverde (7–4)		ESPNU		38–15	2–0

College World Series (1–2)
Date	Opponent	Rank	Site/stadium	Score	Win	Loss	Save	TV	Attendance	Overall record	Regional Record
June 19	No. 16 NC State	No. 7	TD Ameritrade Park Omaha • Omaha, NE	**L** 4–10	Johnston (9–3)	**Beck** (9–2)	Justice (12)	ESPN	22,193	38–16	0–1
June 21	No. 5 Arizona	No. 7	TD Ameritrade Park Omaha • Omaha, NE	**W** 14–5	**Williams** (5–2)	Irvin (6–4)	**Palisch** (2)	ESPNU	19,341	39–16	1–1
June 23	No. 2 Vanderbilt	No. 7	TD Ameritrade Park Omaha • Omaha, NE	**L** 5–6	Murphy (4–1)	**Beck** (9–3)		ESPN	22,804	39–17	1–2

- Rankings from D1 Baseball.

=== Stanford Regional ===
Stanford Regional Teams
(1) Stanford Cardinal	(2) UC Irvine Anteaters	(3) Nevada Wolfpack	(4) North Dakota State Bison

First Round
1	**Stanford**	**9**
4	North Dakota State	1
3	Nevada	0
2	**UC Irvine**	**7**
Lower round 1
4	**North Dakota State**	**6**
3	Nevada	1

Semi-Finals
1	**Stanford**	**12**
2	UC Irvine	4
Lower final
4	North Dakota State	3
2	**UC Irvine**	**18**

Finals
1	**Stanford**	4	**11**
2	UC Irvine	**8**	8

=== Lubbock Super Regional ===
Lubbock Super Regional Game 1
(9) Stanford Cardinal	vs.	(8) Texas Tech Red Raiders

June 11, 2021, 2:00 pm (CDT) at Dan Law Field at Rip Griffin Park in Lubbock, Texas
Team	1	2	3	4	5	6	7	8	9	R	H	E
(9) Stanford	4	0	0	0	0	2	5	3	1	**15**	**14**	**0**
(8) Texas Tech	0	0	0	1	0	1	0	0	1	**3**	**7**	**3**
WP: Brendan Beck (9-1) LP: Chase Hampton (4-1); Home runs: STAN: Tim Tawa (1), Nick Bruser (1), Drew Bowser (1); TTU: Cole Stilwell (1), Nate Rombach (1); Attendance: 4,732

June 12, 2021, 2:00 pm (CDT) at Dan Law Field at Rip Griffin Park in Lubbock, Texas
Team	1	2	3	4	5	6	7	8	9	R	H	E
(8) Texas Tech	0	0	0	0	0	0	0	0	0	**0**	**2**	**2**
(9) Stanford	1	2	0	0	1	4	0	1	0	**9**	**11**	**0**
WP: Williams (4–2) LP: Monteverde (7–4); Home runs: TTU: None; STAN: Brock Jones 3 (3), Tommy Troy (1)

== College World Series ==
2021 College World Series Teams
NC State Wolfpack	(9) Stanford Cardinal	(5) Arizona Wildcats	(4) Vanderbilt Commodores	(3) Tennessee Volunteers	Virginia Cavaliers	(7) Mississippi State Bulldogs	(2) Texas Longhorns

First round	Second round
NC State	10
9	Stanford	4
NC State	1
4	Vanderbilt	0
5	Arizona	6
4	Vanderbilt	7^{12}
Bracket 1
9	Stanford	14
5	Arizona	5
9	Stanford	5
4	Vanderbilt	6
3	Tennessee	0
Virginia	6
Virginia	5
7	Mississippi State	6
7	Mississippi State	2
2	Texas	1
Bracket 2
3	Tennessee	4
2	Texas	8
2	Texas	6
Virginia	2

Semifinals
NC State	1	–
4	Vanderbilt	3	– (Note: Game declared no contest due to COVID-19 protocols with NC State. Vanderbilt advanced in the tournament.)
7	Mississippi State	5	4
2	Texas	8	3

Finals
4	Vanderbilt	8	2	0
7	Mississippi State	2	13	9

== Rankings ==
Ranking movements Legend: ██ Increase in ranking ██ Decrease in ranking — = Not ranked RV = Received votes т = Tied with team above or below
	Week																			
Poll	Pre	1	2	3	4	5	6	7	8	9	10	11	12	13	14	15	16	17	18	Final
Coaches'	—	—*	—	RV	RV	RV	24	23т	18	16	16	16	13	15	10	9	9*	9*		
Baseball America	—	—	—	—	—	—	—	—	22	21	21	19	14	17	12	7	7*	7*		
Collegiate Baseball^	50	—	—	—	—	26	24	25	15	13	13	14	10	14	9	9	8	6		
NCBWA†	RV	RV	RV	30т	29	28	24	24	18	16	16	16	14	14	12	11	9	9*		
D1Baseball	—	—	—	—	—	—	—	—	20	17	18	16	12	15	9	7	7*	7*		

^ Collegiate Baseball ranked 40 teams in their preseason poll, but only ranked 30 teams weekly during the season.
† NCBWA ranks 30 teams in their preseason poll, but only ranks 25 teams weekly during the season.
* A new poll was not released for this week, so for comparison purposes, the previous week's ranking is inserted in this week's slot.
