= 2021 Arizona Wildcats baseball team =

2021 Arizona Wildcats baseball

Tucson Super Regional Champions Tucson Regional Champions Pac-12 Regular Season Champions

College World Series
- Conference: Pac-12 Conference
- CB: No. 6
- Record: 45–18 (21–9 Pac-12)
- Head coach: Jay Johnson (6th season)
- Assistant coaches: Nate Yeskie (2nd season); Dave Lawn (6th season); Marc Wanaka (6th season)
- Home stadium: Hi Corbett Field

2021 Pac-12 Conference baseball standings
	Conf.				Overall
Team	W		L	PCT	W		L	PCT
No. 5 Arizona ‍†‍‍^{y}	21	–	9	.700	45	–	18	.714
No. 10 Oregon ‍‍‍^{y}	20	–	10	.667	39	–	16	.709
No. 7 Stanford ‍‍‍^{y}	17	–	10	.630	39	–	17	.696
No. 21 UCLA ‍‍‍^{y}	18	–	12	.600	37	–	20	.649
Arizona State ‍‍‍^{y}	16	–	14	.533	33	–	22	.600
Oregon State ‍‍‍^{y}	16	–	14	.533	37	–	24	.607
California ‍‍‍	15	–	15	.500	29	–	26	.527
Washington State ‍‍‍	13	–	17	.433	26	–	23	.531
USC ‍‍‍	13	–	17	.433	25	–	26	.490
Utah ‍‍‍	7	–	23	.233	17	–	33	.340
Washington ‍‍‍	6	–	21	.222	20	–	30	.400
† – Conference champion y – Invited to the NCAA tournament As of June 23, 2021; Rankings from D1Baseball

The 2021 Arizona Wildcats baseball team represented the University of Arizona during the 2021 NCAA Division I baseball season. The Wildcats played their home games for the 10th season at Hi Corbett Field. The team was coached by Jay Johnson in his 6th season and final season at Arizona. Following the season, Coach Johnson was hired as the head baseball coach at Louisiana State University. The Wildcats ranked 10th in Collegiate Baseball's preseason poll - their highest preseason ranking in any poll since 2013 - and their incoming recruiting class was ranked 4th in the nation by D1Baseball. On May 23, the Wildcats clinched at least a share of the Pac-12 Championship for the first time since the 2012 season that saw the team win the College World Series. Following a 3-11 loss by the Oregon Ducks to the California Golden Bears on May 28, the team clinched their first outright Pac-12 title since 1989. On May 30, Hi Corbett Field was selected as one of the NCAA's 16 postseason Regional sites for the first time since 2012. The following day the Wildcats were selected as the tournaments No. 5 overall seed - their first selection as a top 8 seed since the implementation of the current seeding system in 1999 - marking their first postseason appearance since 2017. On June 6, the Wildcats defeated UC Santa Barbara 5-2 to win the Tucson Regional and advance to their first Super Regional since 2016 when the team forged their way to the College World Series finals. The Wildcats would go on to defeat Ole Miss 2 games to 1, to advance to their 18th College World Series appearance all-time. They subsequently were eliminated in two games, losing to the defending champion from 2019, No. 4 seed Vanderbilt as well as Stanford.

== Previous season ==
The Wildcats began the 2020 season 10–5, good for a tie for third-place in the Pac-12 prior to the NCAA's decision to cancel the season on March 12 due to the COVID-19 pandemic. Due to the season's cancellation, all Division I college baseball players were granted an extra year of eligibility.

== Personnel ==
=== Roster ===
2021 Arizona Wildcats roster
Pitchers • 4 - Gil Luna - Junior • 12 - Garrett Irvin - Junior • 14 - Jonathan Guardado - Junior • 18 - Austin Smith - Junior • 20 - Bryce Collins - Freshman • 22 - Chandler Murphy - Freshman • 25 - TJ Nichols - Freshman • 26 - Vince Vannelle - Senior • 27 - Dawson Netz - Freshman • 29 - Chase Silseth - Sophomore • 30 - Preston Price - Senior • 34 - Ian Churchill - Junior • 35 - Blake Peyton - Freshman • 36 - George Arias Jr. - Sophomore • 37 - German Fajardo - Freshman • 38 - Riley Cooper - Freshman • 38 - Ryan Kysar - Freshman • 40 - Quinn Flanagan - Sophomore • 43 - Javyn Pimental - Freshman • 45 - Mason Millett - Sophomore • 47 - Hunter Cope - Freshman • 51 - Trevor Long - Freshman • 99 - Randy Abshier - Sophomore	Catchers • 6 - Daniel Susac - Freshman • 31 - Kaden Hopson - Freshman • 50 - Cameron Laliberte - Freshman Infielders • 1 - Kobe Kato - Sophomore • 3 - Tony Bullard - Sophomore • 5 - Kyson Donahue - Freshman • 10 - Jacob Blas - Sophomore • 15 - Jacob Berry - Freshman • 19 - Nik McClaughry - Sophomore • 33 - TJ Curd - Freshman • 46 - Jack Grant - Freshman	Outfielders • 7 - Mac Bingham - Freshman • 8 - Chase Davis - Freshman • 13 - Tyler Casagrande - Sophomore • 16 - Kyle Casper - Freshman • 17 - Branden Boissiere - Sophomore • 23 - Donta Williams - Junior • 28 - Blake Paugh - Junior • 42 - Ryan Holgate - Sophomore • 44 - Tanner O'Tremba - Freshman • 52 - Tag Bross - Freshman Utility • 24 - Jacob Shaver - Freshman

=== Coaches ===
2021 Arizona Wildcats baseball coaching staff
- Jay Johnson - Head coach
- Nate Yeskie - Assistant coach
- Dave Lawn - Assistant coach
- Marc Wanaka - Volunteer assistant coach

=== Opening day ===
Opening Day Starters
Name	Position
Donta Williams	Center fielder
Jacob Blas	Shortstop
Kobe Kato	Second baseman
Branden Boissiere	First baseman
Ryan Holgate	Designated hitter
Daniel Susac	Catcher
Tyler Casagrande	Right fielder
Jacob Berry	Third baseman
Mac Bingham	Left fielder
Chase Silseth	Starting pitcher

== Schedule and results ==
2021 Arizona Wildcats baseball game log
Regular season
Date	Opponent	Rank	Site/stadium	Score	Win	Loss	Save	Overall Record	Pac-12 Record
Feb 19	Ball State	#10	Hi Corbett Field • Tucson, AZ	W 3-0	Silseth (1-0)	Weatherly (0-1)	Vannelle (1)	1-0	
Feb 20	Ball State	#10	Hi Corbett Field • Tucson, AZ	L 7-8	Baker (1-0)	Churchill (0-1)	None	1-1	
Feb 21	Ball State	#10	Hi Corbett Field • Tucson, AZ	L 2-5	Ruetschle (1-0)	Flanagan (0-1)	Orselli (1)	1-2	
Feb 22	Ball State	#24	Hi Corbett Field • Tucson, AZ	W 11-5	Nichols (1-0)	Johnson (0-1)	None	2-2	
Feb 25	Southeastern Louisiana	#24	Hi Corbett Field • Tucson, AZ	W 7-4	Silseth (2-0)	Kinzeler (0-1)	Price (1)	3-2	
Feb 26	Southeastern Louisiana	#24	Hi Corbett Field • Tucson, AZ	W 13-11	Murphy (1-0)	Shaffer (1-1)	Vannelle (2)	4-2	
Feb 27	Southeastern Louisiana	#24	Hi Corbett Field • Tucson, AZ	W 4-3	Long (1-0)	Bartley (0-1)	Flanagan (1)	5-2	
Feb 28	Southeastern Louisiana	#24	Hi Corbett Field • Tucson, AZ	W 14-2	Nichols (2-0)	Upton (1-1)	None	6-2	
Mar 4	vs Oklahoma	#24	Dr Pepper Ballpark • Frisco, TX	W 20-13	Vannelle (1-0)	Taggart (0-1)	None	7-2	
Mar 5	vs Oklahoma	#24	Dr Pepper Ballpark • Frisco, TX	W 12-1	Murphy (2-0)	Olds (0-1)	None	8-2	
Mar 6	vs Dallas Baptist	#24	Dr Pepper Ballpark • Frisco, TX	W 15-8	Vannelle (2-0)	Sagedahl (0-1)	Flanagan (2)	9-2	
Mar 7	vs Missouri	#24	Dr Pepper Ballpark • Frisco, TX	W 8-4	Nichols (3-0)	Hise (0-2)	None	10-2	
Mar 11	Wichita State	#13	Hi Corbett Field • Tucson, AZ	W 8-5	Silseth (3-0)	Eddy (1-2)	Price (2)	11-2	
Mar 12	Wichita State	#13	Hi Corbett Field • Tucson, AZ	L 9-10	Stuempfig (2-0)	Vannelle (2-1)	Haase (3)	11-3	
Mar 13	Wichita State	-	Hi Corbett Field • Tucson, AZ	Cancelled	-	-	-	-	-
Mar 13	Air Force	#13	Hi Corbett Field • Tucson, AZ	L 2-5	Fairburn (2-2)	Irvin (0-1)	Skenes (2)	11-4	
Mar 14	Wichita State	-	Hi Corbett Field • Tucson, AZ	Cancelled	-	-	-	-	-
Mar 14	Air Force	#13	Hi Corbett Field • Tucson, AZ	W 14-5	Price (1-0)	Shuger (0-1)	None	12-4	
Mar 19	at #15 UCLA	#21	Jackie Robinson Stadium • Los Angeles, CA	L 2-3	Mullen (4-0)	Price (1-1)	None	12-5	0-1
Mar 20	at #15 UCLA	#21	Jackie Robinson Stadium • Los Angeles, CA	W 7-3	Cooper (1-0)	Mora (1-1)	Vannelle (3)	13-5	1-1
Mar 21	at #15 UCLA	#21	Jackie Robinson Stadium • Los Angeles, CA	L 3-11	Saum (1-2)	Flanagan (0-2)	None	13-6	1-2
Mar 22	at Loyola Marymount	#23	George C. Page Stadium • Los Angeles, CA	W 18-2	Long (2-0)	Paquet (0-1)	None	14-6	
Mar 26	#15 Oregon	#23	Hi Corbett Field • Tucson, AZ	W 5-4	Silseth (4-0)	Ahlstrom (1-2)	Vannelle (4)	15-6	2-2
Mar 27	#15 Oregon	#23	Hi Corbett Field • Tucson, AZ	W 15-2	Irvin (1-1)	Kafka (2-1)	None	16-6	3-2
Mar 28	#15 Oregon	#23	Hi Corbett Field • Tucson, AZ	L 13-18	Walker (3-1)	Nichols (3-1)	None	16-7	3-3
Apr 1	at #14 Arizona State	#19	Phoenix Municipal Stadium • Phoenix, AZ	W 10-5	Murphy (3-0)	Corrigan (0-1)	None	17-7	4-3
Apr 2	at #14 Arizona State	#19	Phoenix Municipal Stadium • Phoenix, AZ	W 7-6	Vannelle (3-1)	Osman (1-2)	Price (3)	18-7	5-3
Apr 3	at #14 Arizona State	#19	Phoenix Municipal Stadium • Phoenix, AZ	L 2-3	Fall (4-1)	Nichols (3-2)	Levine (2)	18-8	5-4
Apr 6	#18 Arizona State	#16	Hi Corbett Field • Tucson, AZ	W 14-2	Abshier (1-0)	Bodlovich (0-1)	None	19-8	
Apr 9	California	#16	Hi Corbett Field • Tucson, AZ	W 5-1	Silseth (5-0)	Holman (0-1)	None	20-8	6-4
Apr 10	California	#16	Hi Corbett Field • Tucson, AZ	W 4-3	Irvin (2-1)	White (3-1)	Abshier (1)	21-8	7-4
Apr 11	California	#16	Hi Corbett Field • Tucson, AZ	L 1-9	Pasqualotto (4-3)	Nichols (3-3)	Proctor (1)	21-9	7-5
Apr 13	at Grand Canyon	#13	Brazell Field • Phoenix, AZ	L 4-5	Glover (2-1)	Vannelle (3-2)	None	21-10	
Apr 16	at Washington State	#13	Bailey-Brayton Field • Pullman, WA	L 2-21	White (5-2)	Silseth (5-1)	None	21-11	7-6
Apr 17	at Washington State	#13	Bailey-Brayton Field • Pullman, WA	W 13-8	Irvin (3-1)	Mills (3-3)	Flanagan (3)	22-11	8-6
Apr 18	at Washington State	#13	Bailey-Brayton Field • Pullman, WA	W 14-8	Murphy (4-0)	Hawkins (2-5)	Vannelle (5)	23-11	9-6
Apr 20	New Mexico State	#16	Hi Corbett Field • Tucson, AZ	W 11-4	Abshier (2-0)	Mejia (0-2)	None	24-11	
Apr 23	USC	#16	Hi Corbett Field • Tucson, AZ	W 8-5	Silseth (6-1)	Esqueda (4-2)	Flanagan (4)	25-11	10-6
Apr 24	USC	#16	Hi Corbett Field • Tucson, AZ	W 10-6	Murphy (5-0)	Gursky (1-1)	None	26-11	11-6
Apr 25	USC	#16	Hi Corbett Field • Tucson, AZ	W 8-4	Smith (1-0)	Cornwell (4-4)	Vannelle (6)	27-11	12-6
Apr 30	Utah	#10	Hi Corbett Field • Tucson, AZ	W 11-1	Silseth (7-1)	Kelly (0-8)	None	28-11	13-6
May 1	Utah	#10	Hi Corbett Field • Tucson, AZ	W 4-3	Cooper (2-0)	Hurdsman (1-1)	Vannelle (7)	29-11	14-6
May 2	Utah	#10	Hi Corbett Field • Tucson, AZ	W 15-3	Smith (2-0)	Watson (2-6)	None	30-11	15-6
May 4	Grand Canyon	#8	Hi Corbett Field • Tucson, AZ	W 13-2	Nichols (4-3)	Markl (1-1)	None	31-11	
May 7	at #14 Stanford	#8	Sunken Diamond • Stanford, CA	L 4-5	Pancer (5-2)	Flanagan (0-3)	None	31-12	15-7
May 8	at #14 Stanford	#8	Sunken Diamond • Stanford, CA	W 20-2	Irvin (4-1)	Mathews (4-1)	None	32-12	16-7
May 9	at #14 Stanford	#8	Sunken Diamond • Stanford, CA	L 2-8	Williams (1-1)	Smith (2-1)	None	32-13	16-8
May 10	at Santa Clara	-	Schott Stadium • Santa Clara, CA	Cancelled	-	-	-	-	-
May 14	Washington	#11	Hi Corbett Field • Tucson, AZ	W 17-16	Abshier (3-0)	Lamb (3-2)	None	33-13	17-8
May 15	Washington	#11	Hi Corbett Field • Tucson, AZ	W 4-1	Irvin (5-1)	Guerrero (1-3)	None	34-13	18-8
May 16	Washington	#11	Hi Corbett Field • Tucson, AZ	W 11-2	Luna (1-0)	Raeth (2-2)	None	35-13	19-8
May 18	New Mexico State	#8	Hi Corbett Field • Tucson, AZ	W 14-3	Murphy (6-0)	Dickson Jr. (1-2)	None	36-13	
May 21	at Oregon State	#8	Goss Stadium • Corvallis, OR	W 12-4	Silseth (8-1)	Washburn (3-2)	None	37-13	20-8
May 22	at Oregon State	#8	Goss Stadium • Corvallis, OR	L 1-3	Hjerpe (3-5)	Irvin (5-2)	Mulholland (13)	37-14	20-9
May 23	at Oregon State	#8	Goss Stadium • Corvallis, OR	W 6-5	Vannelle (4-2)	Watkins (2-4)	None	38-14	21-9
May 27	Dixie State	#6	Hi Corbett Field • Tucson, AZ	W 4-2	Abshier (4-0)	Gonzales (2-5)	Luna (1)	39-14	
May 28	Dixie State	#6	Hi Corbett Field • Tucson, AZ	L 9-11	Hart (3-5)	Flanagan (0-4)	Hardman (1)	39-15	
May 29	Dixie State	#6	Hi Corbett Field • Tucson, AZ	W 5-4	Vannelle (5-2)	Gerber (1-2)	None	40-15	
NCAA Tucson Regional
Jun 4	(4) Grand Canyon	(1) #6	Hi Corbett Field • Tucson, AZ	W 12-6	Nichols (5-3)	Ohl (10-2)	None	41-15	
Jun 5	(3) UC Santa Barbara	(1) #6	Hi Corbett Field • Tucson, AZ	W 4-0	Irvin (6-2)	McGreevy (9-2)	None	42-15	
Jun 6	(3) UC Santa Barbara	(1) #6	Hi Corbett Field • Tucson, AZ	W 5-2	Murphy (7-0)	Callahan (3-4)	Vannelle (8)	43-15	
NCAA Tucson Super Regional
Jun 11	#14 Ole Miss	#6	Hi Corbett Field • Tucson, AZ	W 9-3	Cooper (3-0)	Diamond (3-5)	None	44-15	
Jun 12	#14 Ole Miss	#6	Hi Corbett Field • Tucson, AZ	L 3-12	Nikhazy (12-2)	Irvin (6-3)	Miller (1)	44-16	
Jun 13	#14 Ole Miss	#6	Hi Corbett Field • Tucson, AZ	W 16-3	Nichols (6-3)	Broadway (4-3)	None	45-16	
College World Series
Jun 19	#1 Vanderbilt	#5	TD Ameritrade Park • Omaha, NE	L 6-7	McElvain (5-1)	Vannelle (5-3)	None	45-17	
Jun 21	#7 Stanford	#5	TD Ameritrade Park • Omaha, NE	L 5-14	Williams (5-2)	Irvin (6-4)	Palisch (2)	45-18	

=== Tucson Regional ===
Tucson Regional Teams
(1) Arizona Wildcats	(4) Grand Canyon Antelopes	(2) Oklahoma State Cowboys	(3) UC Santa Barbara Gauchos

=== Tucson Super Regional ===
Tucson Super Regional Teams
(5) Arizona Wildcats	vs.	(12) Ole Miss Rebels

== College World Series ==
2021 College World Series Teams
NC State Wolfpack	(9) Stanford Cardinal	(5) Arizona Wildcats	(4) Vanderbilt Commodores	Virginia Cavaliers	(3) Tennessee Volunteers	(7) Mississippi State Bulldogs	(2) Texas Longhorns

First round	Second round
NC State	10
9	Stanford	4
NC State	1
4	Vanderbilt	0
5	Arizona	6
4	Vanderbilt	7^{12}
Bracket 1
9	Stanford	14
5	Arizona	5
9	Stanford	5
4	Vanderbilt	6
3	Tennessee	0
Virginia	6
Virginia	5
7	Mississippi State	6
7	Mississippi State	2
2	Texas	1
Bracket 2
3	Tennessee	4
2	Texas	8
2	Texas	6
Virginia	2

Semifinals
NC State	1	–
4	Vanderbilt	3	– (Note: Game declared no contest due to COVID-19 protocols with NC State. Vanderbilt advanced in the tournament.)
7	Mississippi State	5	4
2	Texas	8	3

Finals
4	Vanderbilt	8	2	0
7	Mississippi State	2	13	9

== Rankings ==
Ranking movements
	Week																			
Poll	Pre	1	2	3	4	5	6	7	8	9	10	11	12	13	14	15	16	17	18	Final
Coaches'		*																		
Baseball America																				
NCBWA†																				

† NCBWA ranks 30 teams in their preseason poll, but only ranks 25 teams weekly during the season.
* A new poll was not released for this week, so for comparison purposes, the previous week's ranking is inserted in this week's slot.

== 2021 MLB draft ==
Player	Position	Round	Overall	MLB team
Ryan Holgate	OF	2	70	St. Louis Cardinals
Brandon Boissiere	OF	3	82	Washington Nationals
Donta' Williams	OF	4	106	Baltimore Orioles
Gil Luna	LHP	9	275	Chicago White Sox
Chase Silseth	RHP	11	321	Los Angeles Angels
Kobe Kato	2B	13	388	Houston Astros
Austin Smith	RHP	18	547	Atlanta Braves
