= 2021 Oregon State Beavers baseball team =

Baseball team season

2021 Oregon State Beavers baseball

NCAA tournament, Fort Worth Regional
- Conference: Pac-12 Conference
- Record: 37–24 (16–14 Pac-12)
- Head coach: Mitch Canham (2nd season)
- Assistant coaches: Darwin Barney (1st season); Ryan Gipson (3rd season)
- Pitching coach: Rich Dorman (2nd season)
- Home stadium: Goss Stadium at Coleman Field

2021 Pac-12 Conference baseball standings
	Conf.				Overall
Team	W		L	PCT	W		L	PCT
No. 5 Arizona ‍†‍‍^{y}	21	–	9	.700	45	–	18	.714
No. 10 Oregon ‍‍‍^{y}	20	–	10	.667	39	–	16	.709
No. 7 Stanford ‍‍‍^{y}	17	–	10	.630	39	–	17	.696
No. 21 UCLA ‍‍‍^{y}	18	–	12	.600	37	–	20	.649
Arizona State ‍‍‍^{y}	16	–	14	.533	33	–	22	.600
Oregon State ‍‍‍^{y}	16	–	14	.533	37	–	24	.607
California ‍‍‍	15	–	15	.500	29	–	26	.527
Washington State ‍‍‍	13	–	17	.433	26	–	23	.531
USC ‍‍‍	13	–	17	.433	25	–	26	.490
Utah ‍‍‍	7	–	23	.233	17	–	33	.340
Washington ‍‍‍	6	–	21	.222	20	–	30	.400
† – Conference champion y – Invited to the NCAA tournament As of June 23, 2021; Rankings from D1Baseball

The 2021 Oregon State Beavers baseball team represented Oregon State University in the 2021 NCAA Division I baseball season. The Beavers played their home games at Goss Stadium at Coleman Field and were members of the Pac-12 Conference. The team was coached by Mitch Canham in his 2nd season at Oregon State. The previous season was indefinitely suspended 14 games into the season after the NCAA abruptly canceled all winter and spring season tournaments, including the College World Series, in response to the COVID-19 pandemic.

== Season synopsis ==
The Beavers entered the season unranked and picked to finish 4th in the Pac-12 Conference coaches preseason baseball poll.

Jake Mulholland passed Kevin Gunderson for most saves in Oregon State history when he threw his 38th career save in a 2–1 win against California.

== Roster ==
2021 Oregon State Beavers baseball team
Players
Coaches

#	Pos.	Name	B/T	Height	Weight	Year	Home town
1	INF	Kyler McMahan	R/R	5 ft 9 in (1.75 m)	177 lb (80 kg)	Jr	Seattle, Washington
2	INF	Jordan Donahue	L/R	5 ft 9 in (1.75 m)	163 lb (74 kg)	Fr	Mililani, Hawaii
3	INF	Matthew Gretler	R/R	6 ft 0 in (1.83 m)	180 lb (82 kg)	So	Bonney Lake, Washington
4	INF	Justin Boyd	R/R	6 ft 0 in (1.83 m)	195 lb (88 kg)	Fr	Parker, Colorado
5	OF	Joe Casey	L/L	6 ft 0 in (1.83 m)	187 lb (85 kg)	RS Jr	Corvallis, Oregon
6	INF	Paul Myro IV	R/R	5 ft 8 in (1.73 m)	185 lb (84 kg)	Fr	Las Vegas, Nevada
7	INF	Jake Dukart	L/R	6 ft 1 in (1.85 m)	200 lb (91 kg)	So	Lake Oswego, Oregon
8	INF	Cesar Valero Sanchez	R/R	6 ft 2 in (1.88 m)	198 lb (90 kg)	Fr	Calgary, Alberta
9	INF	Andy Armstrong	R/R	5 ft 9 in (1.75 m)	175 lb (79 kg)	Sr	Salem, Oregon
12	OF	Micah McDowell	L/R	6 ft 1 in (1.85 m)	189 lb (86 kg)	Fr	Halifax, Nova Scotia
13	INF	Richie Mascareñas	R/R	5 ft 10 in (1.78 m)	173 lb (78 kg)	Jr	Las Vegas, Nevada
14	C	Cole Hamilton	L/R	5 ft 9 in (1.75 m)	194 lb (88 kg)	RS So	Salem, Oregon
15	INF	Kyle Dernedde	R/R	5 ft 8 in (1.73 m)	177 lb (80 kg)	Fr	Tualatin, Oregon
16	RHP	Reid Sebby	R/R	6 ft 0 in (1.83 m)	198 lb (90 kg)	Jr	Huntington Beach, California
17	C	Troy Claunch	R/R	6 ft 0 in (1.83 m)	108 lb (49 kg)	Jr	Vacaville, California
18	INF	Ryan Ober	R/R	5 ft 11 in (1.8 m)	196 lb (89 kg)	Jr	Snohomish, Washington
19	RHP	A. J. Lattery	R/R	6 ft 5 in (1.96 m)	240 lb (109 kg)	Fr	Prior Lake, Minnesota
20	OF	Thomas Dukart	L/R	6 ft 2 in (1.88 m)	183 lb (83 kg)	Fr	Lake Oswego, Oregon
21	RHP	Will Frisch	R/R	6 ft 0 in (1.83 m)	226 lb (103 kg)	Fr	Stillwater, Minnesota
22	RHP	Jake Pfennigs	R/R	6 ft 6 in (1.98 m)	217 lb (98 kg)	So	Post Falls, Idaho
23	RHP	Kevin Abel	R/R	6 ft 1 in (1.85 m)	195 lb (88 kg)	RS So	San Diego, California
24	RHP	Nathan Burns	R/R	6 ft 1 in (1.85 m)	193 lb (88 kg)	Jr	West Bend, Wisconsin
25	RHP	Joey Mundt	R/R	6 ft 4 in (1.93 m)	220 lb (100 kg)	So	Hughson, California
26	LHP	Cooper Hjerpe	L/L	6 ft 2 in (1.88 m)	189 lb (86 kg)	Fr	Capay, California
27	C	Gavin Logan	L/R	5 ft 10 in (1.78 m)	191 lb (87 kg)	So	Oyen, Alberta
28	INF	Wade Meckler	S/R	5 ft 10 in (1.78 m)	178 lb (81 kg)	So	Yorba Linda, California
29	OF	Jacob Melton	L/L	6 ft 3 in (1.91 m)	200 lb (91 kg)	So	Medford, Oregon
31	RHP	Jack Washburn	R/R	6 ft 2 in (1.88 m)	211 lb (96 kg)	Fr	Webster, Wisconsin
32	RHP	Mitchell Verburg	R/R	6 ft 3 in (1.91 m)	206 lb (93 kg)	RS Jr	Lake Oswego, Oregon
33	OF	Preston Jones	R/R	5 ft 11 in (1.8 m)	198 lb (90 kg)	Sr	Vancouver, Washington
34	INF	Kyle Fromke	R/R	6 ft 4 in (1.93 m)	205 lb (93 kg)	So	Round Rock, Texas
35	RHP	Jonah Giblin	R/R	6 ft 2 in (1.88 m)	218 lb (99 kg)	Fr	Bainbridge Island, Washington
36	OF	Greg Fuchs	L/R	6 ft 0 in (1.83 m)	199 lb (90 kg)	So	Mercer Island, Washington
37	RHP	Bryant Salgado	R/R	5 ft 11 in (1.8 m)	204 lb (93 kg)	So	Houston, Texas
38	LHP	Jake Mulholland	L/L	6 ft 2 in (1.88 m)	205 lb (93 kg)	Sr	Snohomish, Washington
40	OF	Brady Kasper	L/R	6 ft 1 in (1.85 m)	185 lb (84 kg)	Fr	Mission Viejo, California
43	RHP	Brock Townsend	R/R	5 ft 9 in (1.75 m)	170 lb (77 kg)	So	Eugene, Oregon
44	INF	Garret Forrester	R/R	6 ft 0 in (1.83 m)	211 lb (96 kg)	Fr	Fair Oaks, California
45	RHP	Kyle Keyes	R/R	6 ft 1 in (1.85 m)	186 lb (84 kg)	Fr	Sandy, Utah
50	RHP	Ryan Brown	R/R	6 ft 1 in (1.85 m)	201 lb (91 kg)	Fr	Salem, Oregon
51	LHP	Chase Watkins	L/L	6 ft 3 in (1.91 m)	217 lb (98 kg)	So	Watsonville, California
52	RHP	Jaren Huner	R/R	6 ft 1 in (1.85 m)	222 lb (101 kg)	Fr	Damascus, Oregon
53	RHP	Ian Lawson	R/R	6 ft 6 in (1.98 m)	227 lb (103 kg)	Fr	Hillsboro, Oregon
54	C	Daniel Pruitt	R/R	6 ft 1 in (1.85 m)	203 lb (92 kg)	Fr	Gaston, Oregon
55	LHP	Justin Thorsteinson	L/L	6 ft 2 in (1.88 m)	222 lb (101 kg)	Fr	Langley, British Columbia

Head coach

Mitch Canham

Assistant coach(es)

Darwin Barney
Ryan Gipson

Pitching coach(es)

Rich Dorman

Legend

- (C) Team captain
- (S) Suspended
- (I) Ineligible
- Injured
- Current redshirt

Roster
Last update: February 21, 2021

== Schedule and results ==
Legend
	Oregon State win
	Oregon State loss
	Postponement/Tie
**Bold**	Oregon State team member
Rank	D1 Baseball

2021 Oregon State Beavers baseball game log
Regular season

February
Date	Opponent	Rank	Site/stadium	Score	Win	Loss	Save	Overall record	PAC-12 Record
Feb 19	vs. Kansas State*		Surprise Stadium • Surprise, AZ (Sanderson Ford College Baseball Classic)	2–3	Wicks (1–0)	**Able (0–1)**	Eckberg (1)	0–1	
Feb 20	vs. New Mexico*		Surprise Stadium • Surprise, AZ (Sanderson Ford College Baseball Classic)	14–1	**Hjerpe (1–0)**	Arbruester (0–1)	None	1–1	
Feb 21	vs. Gonzaga*		Surprise Stadium • Surprise, AZ (Sanderson Ford College Baseball Classic)	20–4	**Washburn (1–0)**	Mullan (0–1)	**Townsend (1)**	2–1	
Feb 22	vs. New Mexico*		Surprise Stadium • Surprise, AZ (Sanderson Ford College Baseball Classic)	5–2	**Frisch (1–0)**	Campa (0–1)	**Verburg (1)**	3–1	
Feb 25	at Grand Canyon*		Brazell Field at GCU Ballpark • Phoenix, AZ	4–0	**Abel (1–1)**	Barns (1–1)	None	4–1	
Feb 26	at Grand Canyon*		Brazell Field at GCU Ballpark • Phoenix, AZ	3–1	**Sebby (1–0)**	Scalzo (0–1)	**Mulholland** (1)	5–1	
Feb 27	at Grand Canyon*		Brazell Field at GCU Ballpark • Phoenix, AZ	9–2	**Pfennigs (1–0)**	Glover (0–1)	None	6–1	
Feb 28	at Grand Canyon*		Brazell Field at GCU Ballpark • Phoenix, AZ	4–2	**Salgado (1–0)**	Hull (0–1)	**Mulholland** (2)	7–1	

March
Date	Opponent	Rank	Site/stadium	Score	Win	Loss	Save	Overall record	PAC-12 Record
Mar 4	vs. BYU*	No. 20	Goss Stadium at Coleman Field • Corvallis, OR	1–0	**Sebby (2–0)**	Johnson (0–1)	**Mulholland** (3)	8–1	
Mar 5	vs. BYU*	No. 20	Goss Stadium at Coleman Field • Corvallis, OR	5–3	**Mundt (1–0)**	Smith (0–1)	**Burns** (1)	9–1	
Mar 6	vs. BYU*	No. 20	Goss Stadium at Coleman Field • Corvallis, OR	4–3	**Mulholland (1–0)**	Heaton (0–1)	None	10–1	
Mar 12	vs. Oregon*	No. 16	Goss Stadium at Coleman Field • Corvallis, OR	0–7	Ahlsrom (1–0)	**Able (1–2)**	None	10–2	
Mar 13	vs. Oregon*	No. 16	Goss Stadium at Coleman Field • Corvallis, OR	0–3	Kafka (1–0)	**Hjerpe (1–1)**	Mosiello (1)	10–3	
Mar 14	vs. Oregon*	No. 16	Goss Stadium at Coleman Field • Corvallis, OR	3–1	**Pfennigs (2–0)**	Walker (1–1)	**Mulholland** (4)	11–3	
Mar 19	vs. Washington State	No. 23	Goss Stadium at Coleman Field • Corvallis, OR	2–5	White (3–0)	**Abel (1–3)**	None	11–4	0–1
Mar 20	vs. Washington State	No. 23	Goss Stadium at Coleman Field • Corvallis, OR	10–3	**Washburn (2–0)**	Mills (3–1)	None	12–4	1–1
Mar 21	vs. Washington State	No. 23	Goss Stadium at Coleman Field • Corvallis, OR	9–8	**Salgado (2–0)**	Hawkins (1–2)	**Mulholland** (5)	13–4	2–1
Mar 23	vs. Santa Clara*	No. 21	Goss Stadium at Coleman Field • Corvallis, OR	9–10	Kitchen (4–0)	**Hunter (0–1)**	Howard (4)	13–5	2–1
Mar 24	vs. Santa Clara*	No. 21	Goss Stadium at Coleman Field • Corvallis, OR	9–0	**Washburn (3–0)**	Feikes (0–2)	None	14–5	2–1
Mar 26	at Washington	No. 21	Husky Ballpark • Seattle, WA	3–0	**Abel (2–3)**	Gerling (0–2)	**Mulholland** (6)	15–5	3–1
Mar 27	at Washington	No. 21	Husky Ballpark • Seattle, WA	8–1	**Hjerpe (2–1)**	Enger (2–1)	None	16–5	4–1
Mar 28	at Washington	No. 21	Husky Ballpark • Seattle, WA	**RAINED OUT**					
Mar 29	at Washington	No. 21	Husky Ballpark • Seattle, WA	13–3	**Frisch (2–0)**	Flesland (0–1)	None	17–5	5–1
Mar 30	at Portland*	No. 21	Joe Etzel Field • Portland, OR	7–1	**Townsend (1–0)**	Gillis (1–3)	None	18–5	5–1

April
Date	Opponent	Rank	Site/stadium	Score	Win	Loss	Save	Overall record	PAC-12 Record
Apr 1	vs. Utah	No. 21	Goss Stadium at Coleman Field • Corvallis, OR	4–3	**Verburg (1–0)**	Kelly (0–5)	**Mulholland** (7)	19–5	6–1
Apr 2	vs. Utah	No. 21	Goss Stadium at Coleman Field • Corvallis, OR	17–3	**Abel (3–3)**	Robeniol (1–3)	None	20–5	7–1
Apr 3	vs. Utah	No. 21	Goss Stadium at Coleman Field • Corvallis, OR	3–5	Watson (2–3)	**Hjerpe (2–2)**	Hurdsman (2)	20–6	7–2
Apr 5	vs. Gonzaga*	No. 20	Goss Stadium at Coleman Field • Corvallis, OR	11–3	**Townsend (2–0)**	Gomez (3–1)	None	21–6	7–2
Apr 6	vs. Gonzaga*	No. 20	Goss Stadium at Coleman Field • Corvallis, OR	2–5	Zeglin (3–1)	**Hunter (0–2)**	Jacob (3)	21–7	7–2
Apr 9	at No. 19 Oregon	No. 20	PK Park • Eugene, OR	1–4	Mosiello (2–1)	**Watkins (0–1)**	Somers (5)	21–8	7–3
Apr 10	at No. 19 Oregon	No. 20	PK Park • Eugene, OR	1–5	Kafka (4–1)	**Hjerpe (2–3)**	None	21–9	7–4
Apr 11	at No. 19 Oregon	No. 20	PK Park • Eugene, OR	4–5	Stedman (2–0)	**Mulholland (1–1)**	None	21–10	7–5
Apr 16	vs. California		Goss Stadium at Coleman Field • Corvallis, OR	15–8	**Salgado (3–0)**	Zobac (2–1)	None	22–10	8–5
Apr 17	vs. California		Goss Stadium at Coleman Field • Corvallis, OR	2–1	**Mundt (2–0)**	Sullivan (2–3)	**Mulholland** (8)	23–10	9–5
Apr 18	vs. California		Goss Stadium at Coleman Field • Corvallis, OR	5–3	**Watkins (1–1)**	White (3–1)	**Mulholland** (9)	24–10	10–5
Apr 20	vs. Portland*		Goss Stadium at Coleman Field • Corvallis, OR	11–3	**Burns (1–0)**	Dobmeier (0–3)	None	25–10	10–5
Apr 23	at UC Irvine*		Anteater Ballpark • Irvine, CA	7–5	**Mulholland (2–1)**	Ingebritson (1–1)	**Mundt** (1)	26–10	10–5
Apr 24	at UC Irvine*		Anteater Ballpark • Irvine, CA	9–11	Antone (1–0)	**Watkins (1–2)**	None	26–11	10–5
Apr 25	at UC Irvine*		Anteater Ballpark • Irvine, CA	6–7	Ingebritson (2–1)	**Sebby (2–1)**	None	26–12	10–5
Apr 27	at Loyola Marymount*		George C. Page Stadium • Los Angeles, CA	8–2	**Lawson (1–0)**	Burge (1–3)	None	27–12	10–5
Apr 28	at Loyola Marymount*		George C. Page Stadium • Los Angeles, CA	8–5	**Keyes (1–0)**	Grimm (1–1)	**Mulholland** (10)	28–12	10–5
Apr 30	at UCLA		Jackie Robinson Stadium • Los Angeles, CA	5–6	Rajcic (2–1)	**Washburn (3–1)**	None	28–13	10–6

May
Date	Opponent	Rank	Site/stadium	Score	Win	Loss	Save	Overall record	PAC-12 Record
May 1	at UCLA		Jackie Robinson Stadium • Los Angeles, CA	0–2	Mullen (8–1)	**Hjerpe (2–4)**	Rajcic (3)	28–14	10–7
May 2	at UCLA		Jackie Robinson Stadium • Los Angeles, CA	5–3	**Pfennigs (3–0)**	Bergin (4–3)	**Mulholland** (11)	29–14	11–7
May 7	vs. USC		Goss Stadium at Coleman Field • Corvallis, OR	5–4	**Watkins (2–2)**	Longrie (0–1)	**Mulholland** (12)	30–14	12–7
May 8	vs. USC		Goss Stadium at Coleman Field • Corvallis, OR	9–7	**Frisch (3–0)**	Clark (3–2)	**Mundt** (2)	31–14	13–7
May 9	vs. USC		Goss Stadium at Coleman Field • Corvallis, OR	3–5	Spach (2–0)	**Watkins (2–3)**	None	31–15	13–8
May 14	at Arizona State		Phoenix Municipal Stadium • Phoenix, AZ	6–9	Levine (4–3)	**Mulholland (2–2)**	None	31–16	13–9
May 15	at Arizona State		Phoenix Municipal Stadium • Phoenix, AZ	5–11	Fall (7–1)	**Hjerpe (2–5)**	None	31–17	13–10
May 16	at Arizona State		Phoenix Municipal Stadium • Phoenix, AZ	11–4	**Pfennigs (4–0)**	Murphy (1–1)	None	32–17	14–10
May 18	at Portland*		Joe Etzel Field • Portland, OR	2–7	Brink (1–0)	**Mundt (2–1)**	None	32–18	14–10
May 21	vs. No. 7 Arizona		Goss Stadium at Coleman Field • Corvallis, OR	4–12	Silseth (8–1)	**Washburn (3–2)**	None	32–19	14–11
May 22	vs. No. 7 Arizona		Goss Stadium at Coleman Field • Corvallis, OR	3–1	**Hjerpe (3–5)**	Irvin (5–2)	**Mulholland** (13)	33–19	15–11
May 23	vs. No. 7 Arizona		Goss Stadium at Coleman Field • Corvallis, OR	5–6	Vannelle (4–2)	**Watkins (2–4)**	None	33–20	15–12
May 27	at No. 9 Stanford		Klein Field at Sunken Diamond • Stanford, CA	0–1	Beck (7–1)	**Abel (3–4)**	None	33–21	15–13
May 28	at No. 9 Stanford		Klein Field at Sunken Diamond • Stanford, CA	0–5	Grech (5–5)	**Hjerpe (3–6)**	None	33–22	15–14
May 29	at No. 9 Stanford		Klein Field at Sunken Diamond • Stanford, CA	9–1	**Pfennigs (5–0)**	Williams (2–2)	None	34–22	16–14

Postseason

Fort Worth Regional
Date	Opponent	Rank	Site/stadium	Score	Win	Loss	Save	Overall record	Regional Record
June 4	(3) Dallas Baptist	(2)	Lupton Stadium • Fort Worth, TX	5–6	Hamel (13–2)	**Abel (3–5)**	Kechely (2)	34–23	0–1
June 5	(4) McNeese State	(2)	Lupton Stadium • Fort Worth, TX	10–5	**Watkins (3–4)**	Foster (1–5)	None	35–23	1–1
June 6	No. 8 (1) TCU	(2)	Lupton Stadium • Fort Worth, TX	3–2	**Washburn (4–2)**	Green (1–2)	**Verburg** (2)	36–23	2–1
June 6	(3) Dallas Baptist	(2)	Lupton Stadium • Fort Worth, TX	5–4	**Verburg (2–0)**	Kechely (3–4)	None	37–23	3–1
June 7	(3) Dallas Baptist	(2)	Lupton Stadium • Fort Worth, TX	5–8	Russell (1–0)	**Mundt (2–2)**	Hamel (1)	37–24	3–2

== Fort Worth Regional ==
Fort Worth Regional Teams
No. 6 (1) TCU Horned Frogs	(2) Oregon State Beavers	(3) Dallas Baptist Patriots	(4) McNeese State Cowboys

First Round
1	6 TCU	12
4	McNeese State	4
3	Dallas Baptist	6
2	Oregon State	5
Lower round 1
4	McNeese State	5
2	Oregon State	10

Semi-Finals
1	6 TCU	6
3	Dallas Baptist	8
Lower final
1	6 TCU	2
2	Oregon State	3

Finals
3	Dallas Baptist	4	8
2	Oregon State	5	5

== Rankings ==
Ranking movements Legend: ██ Increase in ranking ██ Decrease in ranking — = Not ranked
	Week																			
Poll	Pre	1	2	3	4	5	6	7	8	9	10	11	12	13	14	15	16	17	18	Final
Coaches'	—	—*	19	16	20	20	17	18	23	—	—	—	—	—	—	—				
Baseball America	—	—	—	17	—	—	—	21	23	22	—	—	—	—	—	—				
Collegiate Baseball^	—	—	21	17	22	20	13	13	—	22	24	—	—	—	—	—				
NCBWA†	—	—	21	16	18	14	14	13	21	21	22	22	23	30	—	—				
D1Baseball	—	—	20	16	23	21	21	20	—	—	—	—	—	—	—	—				

^ Collegiate Baseball ranked 40 teams in their preseason poll, but only ranked 30 teams weekly during the season.
† NCBWA ranks 30 teams in their preseason poll, but only ranks 25 teams weekly during the season.
* A new poll was not released for this week, so for comparison purposes, the previous week's ranking is inserted in this week's slot.

== 2021 MLB draft ==
Player	Position	Round	Overall	MLB team
Kevin Abel	RHP	7	210	Cincinnati Reds
Chase Watkins	LHP	9	274	Chicago Cubs
Bryant Salgado	RHP	14	418	Houston Astros
Nathan Burns	RHP	19	561	Los Angeles Angels
