= 2021 College World Series =

Final stage of the 2021 NCAA Division I baseball tournament

Team (Wins)	Managers	Season
Mississippi State (2)	Chris Lemonis	50–18 (.735)
Vanderbilt (1)	Tim Corbin	49–18 (.731)
- Dates: June 19–30
- MOP: Will Bednar (Mississippi State)
- Umpires: Ramon Armendariz, Perry Costello, Jeff Henrichs, Travis Katzenmeier, Jeff Macias, Steve Mattingly, Mike Morris, Billy Van Raaphorst

Broadcast
- Television: ESPN (United States – English)
- TV announcers: Karl Ravech (play-by-play), Eduardo Pérez, Kyle Peterson (color), Kris Budden (field reporter)

The 2021 College World Series was the final stage of the 2021 NCAA Division I baseball tournament held from June 19–30 at TD Ameritrade Park Omaha. This marked the 74th edition of the College World Series and 71st time the event is being held in Omaha, Nebraska, after the 2020 tournament was canceled due to the COVID-19 pandemic in the United States.

The tournament featured eight teams in two double-elimination brackets with the two winners meeting in a best-of-three championship series.

== Background ==
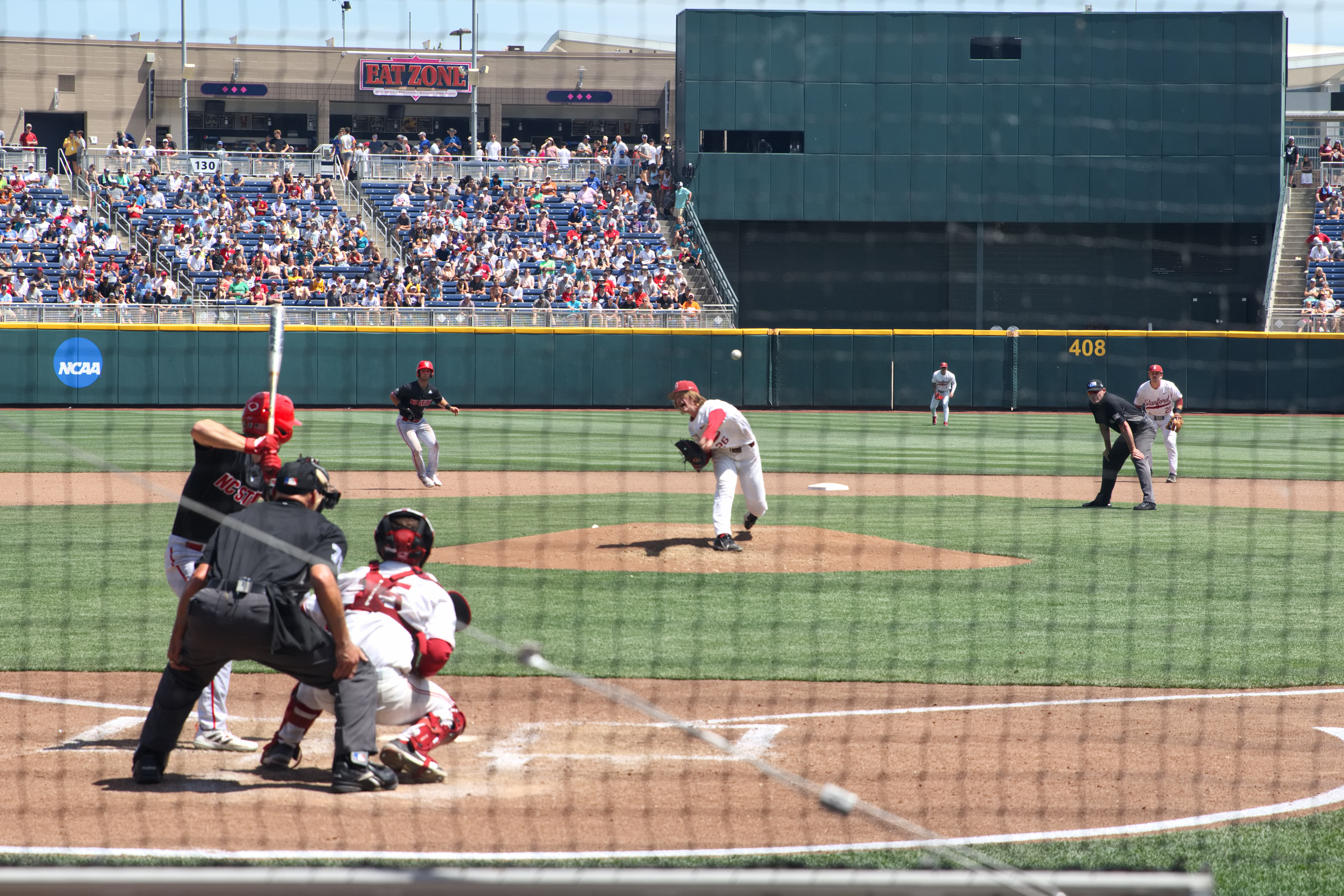
A game between Stanford and NC State on June 19, 2021

The 2021 tournament ends the one-year hiatus left by the cancellation of the 2020 tournament due to the COVID-19 pandemic in the United States. Originally, the National Collegiate Athletic Association announced that attendance at championship events would be restricted for all spring sports, including this year's CWS at TD Ameritrade Park Omaha, to 50% due to the ongoing pandemic, meaning just 12,000 spectators per game. However, on May 19, the NCAA announced that public health authorities would be in charge of placing restrictions on the baseball and softball championships. College World Series officials stated that crowds would return to full capacity.

== Participants ==
School	Conference	Record (Conf)	Head coach	Super Regional	Previous CWS Appearances	CWS Best Finish	CWS W-L Record
NC State	ACC	35–18 (19–14)	Elliott Avent	Fayetteville	2 (last: 2013)	3rd (1968)	3–4
Stanford	Pac–12	38–15 (17–10)	David Esquer	Lubbock	16 (last: 2008)	1st (1987, 1988)	40–29
Arizona	Pac–12	45–16 (21–9)	Jay Johnson	Tucson	17 (last: 2016)	1st (1976, 1980, 1986, 2012)	43–30
Vanderbilt	SEC	45–15 (19–10)	Tim Corbin	Nashville	4 (last: 2019)	1st (2014, 2019)	16–7
Tennessee	SEC	50–16 (20–10)	Tony Vitello	Knoxville	4 (last: 2005)	2nd (1951)	8–8
Virginia	ACC	35–25 (18–18)	Brian O'Connor	Columbia	5 (last: 2015)	1st (2015)	12–8
Mississippi State	SEC	45–16 (20–10)	Chris Lemonis	Starkville	11 (last: 2019)	2nd (2013)	13–22
Texas	Big 12	47–15 (17–7)	David Pierce	Austin	36 (last: 2018)	1st (1949, 1950, 1975, 1983, 2002, 2005)	85–61

== Bracket ==
Seeds listed below indicate national seeds only

First round	Second round
NC State	10
9	Stanford	4
NC State	1
4	Vanderbilt	0
5	Arizona	6
4	Vanderbilt	7^{12}
Bracket 1
9	Stanford	14
5	Arizona	5
9	Stanford	5
4	Vanderbilt	6
3	Tennessee	0
Virginia	6
Virginia	5
7	Mississippi State	6
7	Mississippi State	2
2	Texas	1
Bracket 2
3	Tennessee	4
2	Texas	8
2	Texas	6
Virginia	2

Semifinals
NC State	1	–
4	Vanderbilt	3	– (Note: Game declared no contest due to COVID-19 protocols with NC State. Vanderbilt advanced in the tournament.)
7	Mississippi State	5	4
2	Texas	8	3

Finals
4	Vanderbilt	8	2	0
7	Mississippi State	2	13	9

== Bracket 1 ==
June 19, 2021; 1:10 pm CDT (UTC-5); Game 1	Stanford	4–10	NC State	TD Ameritrade Park Omaha; Attendance: 22,193
June 19, 2021; 1:10 pm CDT (UTC-5); Game 1	LP: Brandon Beck (9–2)	Boxscore	WP: Reid Johnston (9–3); Sv: Evan Justice (12)	TD Ameritrade Park Omaha; Attendance: 22,193

June 19, 2021; 6:09 pm CDT (UTC-5); Game 2	Vanderbilt	7–6 (F/12)	Arizona	TD Ameritrade Park Omaha; Attendance: 23,870
June 19, 2021; 6:09 pm CDT (UTC-5); Game 2	WP: Chris McElvain (5–1)	Boxscore	LP: Vince Vannelle (5–3)	TD Ameritrade Park Omaha; Attendance: 23,870

June 21, 2021; 1:08 pm CDT (UTC-5); Game 5	Arizona	5–14	Stanford	TD Ameritrade Park Omaha; Attendance: 19,341
June 21, 2021; 1:08 pm CDT (UTC-5); Game 5	LP: Garrett Irvin (6–3)	Boxscore	WP: Alex Williams (5–2); Sv: Jacob Palisch (2)	TD Ameritrade Park Omaha; Attendance: 19,341

June 21, 2021; 6:07 pm CDT (UTC-5); Game 6	NC State	1–0	Vanderbilt	TD Ameritrade Park Omaha; Attendance: 23,712
June 21, 2021; 6:07 pm CDT (UTC-5); Game 6	WP: Sam Highfill (9–2); Sv: Evan Justice (13)	Boxscore	LP: Jack Leiter (10–4)	TD Ameritrade Park Omaha; Attendance: 23,712

June 23, 2021; 6:08 pm CDT (UTC-5); Game 9	Vanderbilt	6–5	Stanford	TD Ameritrade Park Omaha; Attendance: 22,804
June 23, 2021; 6:08 pm CDT (UTC-5); Game 9	WP: Luke Murphy (4–1)	Boxscore	LP: Brandon Beck (9–3)	TD Ameritrade Park Omaha; Attendance: 22,804

June 25, 2021; 2:07 pm CDT (UTC-5); Game 11	NC State	1–3	Vanderbilt	TD Ameritrade Park Omaha; Attendance: 20,538
June 25, 2021; 2:07 pm CDT (UTC-5); Game 11	LP: Garrett Payne (0–1)	Boxscore	WP: Kumar Rocker (14–3); Sv: Luke Murphy (9)	TD Ameritrade Park Omaha; Attendance: 20,538

June 26, 2021; 1:07 pm CDT (UTC-5); Game 13	NC State	WO	Vanderbilt	TD Ameritrade Park Omaha

== Bracket 2 ==
June 20, 2021; 1:09 pm CDT (UTC-5); Game 3	Tennessee	0–6	Virginia	TD Ameritrade Park Omaha; Attendance: 22,130
June 20, 2021; 1:09 pm CDT (UTC-5); Game 3	LP: Chad Dallas (11–2)	Boxscore	WP: Andrew Abbott (9–6); Sv: Matt Wyatt (1)	TD Ameritrade Park Omaha; Attendance: 22,130

June 20, 2021; 6:09 pm CDT (UTC-5); Game 4	Texas	1–2	Mississippi State	TD Ameritrade Park Omaha; Attendance: 23,885
June 20, 2021; 6:09 pm CDT (UTC-5); Game 4	LP: Ty Madden (7–5)	Boxscore	WP: Will Bednar (8–1); Sv: Landon Sims (11)	TD Ameritrade Park Omaha; Attendance: 23,885

June 22, 2021; 1:07 pm CDT (UTC-5); Game 7	Texas	8–4	Tennessee	TD Ameritrade Park Omaha; Attendance: 19,150
June 22, 2021; 1:07 pm CDT (UTC-5); Game 7	WP: Tanner Witt (5–0)	Boxscore	LP: Sean Hunley (7–5)	TD Ameritrade Park Omaha; Attendance: 19,150

June 22, 2021; 6:07 pm CDT (UTC-5); Game 8	Virginia	5–6	Mississippi State	TD Ameritrade Park Omaha; Attendance: 22,803
June 22, 2021; 6:07 pm CDT (UTC-5); Game 8	LP: Stephen Schoch (4–2)	Boxscore	WP: Cade Smith (3–0); Sv: Landon Sims (12)	TD Ameritrade Park Omaha; Attendance: 22,803

June 24, 2021; 6:07 pm CDT (UTC-5); Game 10	Virginia	2–6	Texas	TD Ameritrade Park Omaha; Attendance: 23,173
June 24, 2021; 6:07 pm CDT (UTC-5); Game 10	LP: Matt Wyatt (4–2)	Boxscore	WP: Cole Quintanilla (5–0; Sv: Aaron Nixon (9)	TD Ameritrade Park Omaha; Attendance: 23,173

June 25, 2021; 6:56 pm CDT (UTC-5); Game 12	Mississippi State	5–8	Texas	TD Ameritrade Park Omaha; Attendance: 24,003
June 25, 2021; 6:56 pm CDT (UTC-5); Game 12	LP: Brandon Smith (4–4)	Boxscore	WP: Aaron Nixon (4–3)	TD Ameritrade Park Omaha; Attendance: 24,003

June 26, 2021; 6:08 pm CDT (UTC-5); Game 14	Mississippi State	4–3	Texas	TD Ameritrade Park Omaha; Attendance: 21,883
June 26, 2021; 6:08 pm CDT (UTC-5); Game 14	WP: Landon Sims (5–0)	Boxscore	LP: Cole Quintanilla (5–1)	TD Ameritrade Park Omaha; Attendance: 21,883

== Finals ==
=== Game 1 ===
June 28, 2021 6:00 p.m. (CDT) at TD Ameritrade Park Omaha in Omaha, Nebraska
Team	1	2	3	4	5	6	7	8	9	R	H	E
Mississippi State	1	0	0	1	0	0	0	0	0	2	5	0
Vanderbilt	7	0	0	0	0	0	1	0	X	8	5	0
WP: Jack Leiter (11–4) LP: Christian MacLeod (6–6) Sv: Nick Maldonado (9); Home runs: MSU: Kamren James (12); VAN: Jayson Gonzalez (9); Attendance: 24,052; Boxscore

=== Game 2 ===
June 29, 2021 6:00 p.m. (CDT) at TD Ameritrade Park Omaha in Omaha, Nebraska
Team	1	2	3	4	5	6	7	8	9	R	H	E
Vanderbilt	0	1	0	0	0	0	0	0	1	2	4	3
Mississippi State	1	0	4	1	2	0	5	0	X	13	14	0
WP: Preston Johnson (4–0) LP: Christian Little (3–2); Home runs: VAN: CJ Rodriguez (5), Maxwell Romero Jr. (4); MSU: None; Attendance: 24,122; Boxscore

=== Game 3 ===
June 30, 2021 6:00 p.m. (CDT) at TD Ameritrade Park Omaha in Omaha, Nebraska
Team	1	2	3	4	5	6	7	8	9	R	H	E
Mississippi State	1	2	0	0	2	0	4	0	0	9	12	0
Vanderbilt	0	0	0	0	0	0	0	0	0	0	1	3
WP: Will Bednar (9–1) LP: Kumar Rocker (14–4) Sv: Landon Sims (13); Home runs: MSU: Kellum Clark (5), Logan Tanner (15); VAN: None; Attendance: 24,052; Boxscore

=== Composite line score ===
2021 College World Series Finals (2–1): Mississippi State wins.

Team	1	2	3	4	5	6	7	8	9	R	H	E
Mississippi State	3	2	4	2	4	0	9	0	0	24	31	0
Vanderbilt	7	1	0	0	0	0	1	0	1	10	10	6
Home runs: MSU: Kellum Clark (1), Kamren James (1), Logan Tanner (1); VAN: Jayson Gonzalez (1), CJ Rodriguez (1), Maxwell Romero Jr. (1); Total attendance: 72,226 Average attendance: 24,075

== All-Tournament Team ==
The following players were members of the College World Series All-Tournament Team.

Position	Player	School
P	Will Bednar (MOP)	Mississippi State
P	Jack Leiter	Vanderbilt
C	Logan Tanner	Mississippi State
1B	Luke Hancock	Mississippi State
2B	Tim Tawa	Stanford
3B	Zack Gelof	Virginia
SS	Lane Forsythe	Mississippi State
OF	Tanner Allen	Mississippi State
OF	Brock Jones	Stanford
OF	Rowdey Jordan	Mississippi State
DH	Ivan Melendez	Texas
