= 2021 NC State Wolfpack baseball team =

American college baseball season

2021 NC State Wolfpack baseball

NCAA Ruston Regional champion Fayetteville Super Regional champion

College World Series
- Conference: Atlantic Coast Conference

Ranking
- Coaches: No. 17
- CB: No. 7
- Record: 37–19 (19–15 ACC)
- Head coach: Elliott Avent (24th season)
- Assistant coaches: Chris Hart (16th season); Joey Holcomb (2nd season)
- Pitching coach: Clint Chrysler (3rd season)
- Home stadium: Doak Field

2021 Atlantic Coast Conference baseball standings
	Conf.				Overall
Team	W		L	PCT	W		L	PCT
Atlantic
No. 10 Notre Dame ^{x}‍‍‍^{y}	25	–	10	.714	34	–	13	.723
No. 4 NC State ‍‍‍^{y}	19	–	14	.576	37	–	19	.661
Florida State ‍‍‍^{y}	20	–	16	.556	31	–	24	.564
Louisville ‍‍‍	16	–	16	.500	28	–	22	.560
Clemson ‍‍‍	16	–	20	.444	25	–	27	.481
Wake Forest ‍‍‍	10	–	22	.313	20	–	27	.426
Boston College ‍‍‍	10	–	23	.303	21	–	28	.429
Coastal
Georgia Tech ^{x}‍‍‍^{y}	21	–	15	.583	31	–	25	.554
Miami (FL) ‍‍‍^{y}	20	–	15	.571	33	–	21	.611
Virginia ‍‍‍^{y}	18	–	18	.500	36	–	27	.571
North Carolina ‍‍‍^{y}	18	–	18	.500	28	–	27	.509
Duke ‍‍‡‍^{y}	16	–	17	.485	33	–	22	.600
Pittsburgh ‍‍‍	16	–	17	.485	23	–	20	.535
Virginia Tech ‍‍‍	16	–	20	.444	27	–	25	.519
x – Division champion ‡ – Tournament champion y – Invited to the NCAA tournament As of July 1, 2021; Rankings from D1Baseball

The 2021 NC State Wolfpack baseball team represented North Carolina State University during the 2021 NCAA Division I baseball season. The Wolfpack played their home games at Doak Field as a member of the Atlantic Coast Conference. They were led by head coach Elliott Avent, who was in his 25th season at NC State.

== Previous season ==
On March 12, 2020, due to the COVID-19 pandemic, NC State and the ACC announced the season was suspended. On March 17, 2020, the Atlantic Coast Conference announced all spring sports would be cancelled for the remainder of the season.

== Personnel ==
=== Roster ===
2021 NC State Wolfpack roster
Pitchers: 10 - David Harrison – Junior; 18 - Andrew Tillery – Sophomore; 19 - Dalton Feeney – (redshirt) Junior; 22 - Baker Nelson – Sophomore; 25 - Austin Pace – Freshman; 28 - Tristan Sipple – Freshman; 29 - Reid Johnston – Junior; 34 - Evan Justice – Junior; 35 - Cameron Cotter – (redshirt) Sophomore; 36 - Garrett Payne – Freshman; 37 - Logan Bender – Junior; 41 - Cameron Arnold – Freshman; 43 - John Miralia – Freshman; 44 - Kent Klyman – Senior; 48 - Trey Cooper – Freshman; 51 - Canaan Silver – Junior	Catchers: 5 - Bryce Behmer – Freshman; Infielders: 6 - Vojtech Mensik – Sophomore; 8 - Jose Torres – Freshman; 11 - Eddie Eisert – Freshman; 15 - J.T. Jarrett – Junior; 20 - DeAngelo Giles – Freshman	Outfielders: 1 - Terrell Tatum – Junior; 2 - Noah Soles – Freshman; 14 - Jonny Butler – Junior; 27 - Trey Truitt – Freshman; 31 - Thayer Thomas – (redshirt) Sophomore; Utility: 3 - Devonte Brown (INF/OF) – Junior; 7 - Danny Carnazzo (C/INF) – (redshirt) Junior; 12 - Austin Murr (INF/OF) – Junior; 13 - Tyler McDonough (INF/OF) – Sophomore; 16 - Chris Villaman (P/INF) – Freshman; 17 - Sam Highfill (P/INF) – Freshman; 23 - Matt Willadsen (P/INF) – Freshman; 24 - Luca Tresh (C/OF) – Sophomore; 32 - Coby Ingle (RHP/OF) – Freshman; 45 - Cooper King (RHP/INF) – Freshman; 46 - Connor Monroe (RHP/INF) – Freshman

=== Coaching staff ===
2021 nc state wolfpack coaching staff
Name	Position	Seasons at NC State	Alma mater
Elliott Avent	Head coach	25	NC State (1978)
Chris Hart	Associate head coach	16	Florida State (2003)
Clint Chrysler	Pitching Coach	3	Daytona State (2009)
Joey Holcomb	Assistant Coach	2	Huntingdon (2006)

== Schedule ==
Legend
	NC State win
	NC State loss
	Postponement
**Bold**	NC State team member
*	Non-Conference game
†	Make-Up Game

2021 NC State Wolfpack baseball game log
Regular season
February (2–4)

Date	Opponent	Rank	Site/stadium	Score	Win	Loss	Save	Attendance	Overall record	ACC record
February 19	VMI*	No. 13	Doak Field • Raleigh, NC	canceled					–	–
February 20	VMI*	No. 13	Doak Field • Raleigh, NC	canceled					–	–
February 21	VMI*	No. 13	Doak Field • Raleigh, NC	canceled					–	–
February 21	Davidson*	No. 13	Doak Field • Raleigh, NC	**W** 13–3	**Johnston** (1–0)	Fenton (0–1)	None	198	1–0	–
February 21	Davidson*	No. 13	Doak Field • Raleigh, NC	**W** 6–4	**Klyman** (2–0)	Flynn (0–1)	None	198	2–0	–
February 23	UNC-Greensboro*	No. 13	Doak Field • Raleigh, NC	**L** 13–16	Stephens (1–0)	**Klyman** (1–1)	Robinson (2)	198	2–1	–
February 26	No. 15 Georgia Tech	No. 13	Doak Field • Raleigh, NC	**L** 2–9	Hurter (1–0)	**Justice** (0–1)	None	198	2–2	0–1
February 27	No. 15 Georgia Tech	No. 13	Doak Field • Raleigh, NC	**L** 3–8	Smith (1–0)	**Klyman** (1–2)	Finley (1)	198	2–3	0–2
February 28	No. 15 Georgia Tech	No. 13	Doak Field • Raleigh, NC	**L** 4–8	King (1–0)	**Villaman** (0–1)	None	327	2–4	0–3

March (7–5)

Date	Opponent	Rank	Site/stadium	Score	Win	Loss	Save	Attendance	Overall record	ACC record
March 2	Campbell*		Doak Field • Raleigh, NC	**W** 14–6	**Willadsen** (1–0)	Boxrucker (0–1)	None	294	3–4	0–3
March 5	No. 9 Miami		Doak Field • Raleigh, NC	**W** 11–5	**Justice** (1–1)	Garland (0–1)	Johnston (1)	346	4–4	1–3
March 6	No. 9 Miami		Doak Field • Raleigh, NC	**L** 4–6	Arguelles (2–0)	**Silver** (0–1)	Palmquist (3)	361	4–5	1–4
March 7	No. 9 Miami		Doak Field • Raleigh, NC	**L** 4–6	Arguelles (3–0)	**Villaman** (0–2)	Palmquist (4)	393	4–6	1–5
March 12	at Duke		Durham Bulls Athletic Park • Durham, NC	canceled					4–6	1–5
March 13	at Duke		Durham Bulls Athletic Park • Durham, NC	canceled					4–6	1–5
March 14	at Duke		Durham Bulls Athletic Park • Durham, NC	canceled					4–6	1–5
March 16	at Coastal Carolina*		Springs Brooks Stadium • Conway, SC	canceled					4–6	1–5
March 19	No. 8 Louisville		Doak Field • Raleigh, NC	**L** 1–13	Kirian (4–0)	**Justice** (1–2)	None	346	4–7	1–6
March 20	No. 8 Louisville		Doak Field • Raleigh, NC	**L** 3–6	Albanese (3–0)	**Highfill** (0–1)	Corbett (3)	353	4–8	1–7
March 21	No. 8 Louisville		Doak Field • Raleigh, NC	**L** 3–8	Elliott (2–1)	**Feeney** (0–1)	None	304	4–9	1–8
March 23	at UNC-Wilmington*		Brooks Stadium • Wilmington, NC	**W** 5–3	**King** (1–0)	Cota (0–1)	**Villaman** (1)	492	5–9	1–8
March 26	at No. 24 North Carolina		Boshamer Stadium • Chapel Hill, NC	**W** 9–2	**Johnston** (1–0)	Love (4–1)	None	850	6–9	2–8
March 27	at No. 24 North Carolina		Boshamer Stadium • Chapel Hill, NC	**W** 6–1	**Highfill** (0–1)	Alba (2–2)	None	850	7–9	3–8
March 28	at No. 24 North Carolina		Boshamer Stadium • Chapel Hill, NC	**W** 8–3	**Willadsen** (1–0)	Sandy (1–1)	None	850	8–9	4–8
March 30	at UNC-Greensboro*		UNCG Baseball Stadium • Greensboro, NC	**W** 3–0	**Villaman** (1–2)	King (0–3)	None	311	9–9	4–8

April (12–4)

Date	Opponent	Rank	Site/stadium	Score	Win	Loss	Save	Attendance	Overall record	ACC record
April 2	Clemson		Doak Field • Raleigh, NC	**L** 6–10	Clayton (4–0)	**Johnston** (2–1)	None	362	9–10	4–9
April 3	Clemson		Doak Field • Raleigh, NC	**L** 3–9	Askew (1–0)	**Highfill** (1–2)	Gilbert (3)	422	9–11	4–10
April 4	Clemson		Doak Field • Raleigh, NC	**W** 9–5	**Justice** (2–2)	Gilbert (1–2)	None	360	10–11	5–10
April 6	Appalachian State*		Doak Field • Raleigh, NC	**W** 13–2	**Villaman** (2–2)	Martinez (3–4)	None	365	11–11	5–10
April 9	at Boston College		Eddie Pellagrini Diamond • Brighton, MA	**W** 20–5	**Johnston** (3–1)	Mason (3–4)	None	150	12–11	6–10
April 10	at Boston College		Eddie Pellagrini Diamond • Brighton, MA	**W** 5–4	**Highfill** (2–2)	Walsh (1–3)	**Justice** (1)	150	13–11	7–10
April 11	at Boston College		Eddie Pellagrini Diamond • Brighton, MA	**W** 7–0	**Willadsen** (3–0)	Stiegler (1–2)	None	150	14–11	8–10
April 14	North Carolina A&T*		Doak Field • Raleigh, NC	**W** 10–4	**Villaman** (3–2)	Meachem (0–6)	None	332	15–11	8–10
April 16	No. 10 Notre Dame		Frank Eck Stadium • South Bend, IN	**L** 2–3	Kohlhepp (4–1)	**Johnston** (3–2)	None	279	15–12	8–11
April 17	No. 10 Notre Dame		Frank Eck Stadium • South Bend, IN	**W** 5–2	**Highfill** (3–2)	Bertrand (3–1)	**Justice** (2)	237	16–12	9–11
April 18	No. 10 Notre Dame		Frank Eck Stadium • South Bend, IN	**L** 2–11	Kohlhepp (5–1)	**Willadsen** (3–1)	Sheridan (3)	188	16–13	9–12
April 23	No. 22 Virginia Tech		Doak Field • Raleigh, NC	**W** 3–1	**Highfill** (4–2)	Alford (1–3)	**Justice** (3)	395	17–13	10–12
April 24	No. 22 Virginia Tech		Doak Field • Raleigh, NC	**W** 11–3	**Johnston** (4–2)	Simonelli (4–1)	None	380	18–13	11–12
April 25	No. 22 Virginia Tech		Doak Field • Raleigh, NC	**W** 7–6	**Justice** (3–2)	Heard (3–3)	None	481	19–13	12–12
April 27	at Appalachian State*		Beaver Field at Jim and Bettie Smith Stadium • Boone, NC	**W** 7–3	**Villaman** (4–2)	Tujetsch (0–3)	None	220	20–13	12–12
April 30	at Wake Forest		David F. Couch Ballpark • Winston-Salem, NC	**W** 13–7	**Feeney** (1–1)	Oxford (0–1)	**Justice** (4)	707	21–13	13–12

May (7–2)

Date	Opponent	Rank	Site/stadium	Score	Win	Loss	Save	Attendance	Overall record	ACC record
May 1	at Wake Forest		David F. Couch Ballpark • Winston-Salem, NC	**L** 11–14	Lowder (2–2)	**Willadsen** (3–2)	Adler (6)	685	21–14	13–13
May 2	at Wake Forest		David F. Couch Ballpark • Winston-Salem, NC	**W** 15–8	**Johnston** (5–2)	Fleming (2–6)	None	621	22–14	14–13
May 4	Elon*		Doak Field • Raleigh, NC	canceled					22–14	14–13
May 11	UNC-Wilmington*		Doak Field • Raleigh, NC	**W** 9–1	**Villaman** (5–2)	Holjes (0–2)	None	427	23–14	14–13
May 14	at No. 16 Pittsburgh		Charles L. Cost Field • Pittsburgh, PA	**W** 3–2	**Johnston** (6–2)	McKennitt (1–1)	**Justice** (5)	210	24–14	15–13
May 15	at No. 16 Pittsburgh		Charles L. Cost Field • Pittsburgh, PA	**W** 9–7	**Tillery** (1–0)	Hansen (1–4)	**Justice** (6)	210	25–14	16–13
May 16	at No. 16 Pittsburgh		Charles L. Cost Field • Pittsburgh, PA	**W** 10–3	**Willadsen** (4–2)	Corcoran (0–2)	None	210	26–14	17–13
May 20	No. 16 Florida State	No. 23	Doak Field • Raleigh, NC	**W** 6–4	**Justice** (4–2)	Perdue (1–2)	None	1700	27–14	18–13
May 21	No. 16 Florida State	No. 23	Doak Field • Raleigh, NC	**W** 6–4	**Highfill** (5–2)	Crowell (1–3)	**Justice** (7)	1700	28–14	19–13
May 22	No. 16 Florida State	No. 23	Doak Field • Raleigh, NC	**L** 11–15	Kwiatkowski (2–2)	**Silver** (0–2)	None	1700	28–15	19–14

Postseason
ACC Tournament (2–2)

Date	Opponent	Rank	Site/stadium	Score	Win	Loss	Save	Attendance	Overall record	ACCT record
May 27	vs (10) Pittsburgh	No. 16 (3)	Truist Field • Charlotte, NC	**W** 3–2	**Johnston** (7–2)	Gilbertson (6–5)	**Justice** (8)	3,987	29–15	1–0
May 28	vs (6) North Carolina	No. 16 (3)	Truist Field • Charlotte, NC	**L** 6–9	Love (8–4)	**Tillery** (1–1)	O'Brien (3)	7,291	29–16	1–1
May 29	vs (2) Georgia Tech	No. 16 (3)	Truist Field • Charlotte, NC	**W** 8–1	**Highfill** (6–2)	Grissom, Jr. (1–2)	**Justice** (9)	4,960	30–16	2–1
May 30	vs (9) Duke	No. 16 (3)	Truist Field • Charlotte, NC	**L** 0–1	Stinson (3–3)	**Willadsen** (4–3)	Johnson (7)	7,162	30–17	2–2

Ruston Regional (3–0)

Date	Opponent	Rank	Site/stadium	Score	Win	Loss	Save	Attendance	Overall record	NCAAT record
June 4	(3) Alabama	No. 16 (2)	J. C. Love Field at Pat Patterson Park • Ruston, LA	**W** 8–1	**Johnston** (8–2)	Ras (7–5)	None	1,075	31–17	1–0
June 4	No. 18 (1) Louisiana Tech	No. 16 (2)	J. C. Love Field at Pat Patterson Park • Ruston, LA	**W** 8–3	**Highfill** (7–2)	Jennings (5–4)	**Justice** (10)	2,817	32–17	2–0
June 4	No. 18 (1) Louisiana Tech	No. 16 (2)	J. C. Love Field at Pat Patterson Park • Ruston, LA	**W** 14–7	**Willadsen** (5–3)	Martinez (4–1)	**Villaman** (2)	2,513	33–17	3–0

Fayetteville Super Regional (2–1)

Date	Opponent	Rank	Site/stadium	Score	Win	Loss	Save	Attendance	Overall record	NCAAT record
June 11	No. 1 Arkansas	No. 16	Baum–Walker Stadium • Fayetteville, AR	**L** 2–21	Wicklander (7–1)	**Johnston** (8–3)	None	11,084	33–18	3–1
June 12	No. 1 Arkansas	No. 16	Baum–Walker Stadium • Fayetteville, AR	**W** 6–5	**Highfill** (8–2)	Costeiu (8–3)	**Justice** (11)	11,084	34–18	4–1
June 13	No. 1 Arkansas	No. 16	Baum–Walker Stadium • Fayetteville, AR	**W** 3–2	**Justice** (5–2)	Kopps (12–1)	None	11,084	35–18	5–1

College World Series (2–1)

Date	Opponent	Rank	Site/stadium	Score	Win	Loss	Save	Attendance	Overall record	NCAAT record
June 19	No. 9 Stanford		TD Ameritrade Park • Omaha, NE	**W** 10–4	**Johnston** (9–3)	Beck (9–2)	**Justice** (12)	22,193	36–18	6–1
June 21	No. 4 Vanderbilt		TD Ameritrade Park • Omaha, NE	**W** 1–0	**Highfill** (9–2)	Leiter (10–4)	**Justice** (13)	23,712	37–18	7–1
June 25	No. 4 Vanderbilt		TD Ameritrade Park • Omaha, NE	**L** 1–3	Rocker (14–3)	**Payne** (0–1)	Murphy (9)	20,738	37–19	7–2

All rankings from D1Baseball except for Super Regional and College World Series where national seeds are used instead.

== Ruston Regional ==
Ruston Regional Teams
(1) Louisiana Tech Bulldogs	(2) NC State Wolfpack	(3) Alabama Crimson Tide	(4) Rider Broncs

First Round
1	Louisiana Tech	18
4	Rider	2
3	Alabama	1
2	NC State	8
Lower round 1
4	Rider	1
3	Alabama	3

Semi-Finals
1	Louisiana Tech	3
2	NC State	8
Lower final
3	Alabama	8
1	Louisiana Tech	10

Finals
2	NC State	14	–
1	Louisiana Tech	7	–

Ruston Regional Round 1
(3) Alabama Crimson Tide	vs.	(2) NC State Wolfpack

June 4, 2021 2:00 pm (EDT) at J. C. Love Field at Pat Patterson Park in Ruston, Louisiana
Team	1	2	3	4	5	6	7	8	9	R	H	E
(3) Alabama	0	0	0	0	1	0	0	0	0	1	4	0
(2) NC State	0	2	2	0	3	0	0	1	X	8	9	0
WP: Reid Johnston (8–2) LP: Tyler Ras (7–5); Home runs: BAMA: Jackson Tate; NCSU: Luca Tresh; Devonte Brown (2); Tyler McDonough; Jose Torres; Attendance: 1,075

Ruston Regional Round 2
(2) NC State Wolfpack	vs.	(1) Louisiana Tech

June 5, 2021 7:00 pm (EDT) at J. C. Love Field at Pat Patterson Park in Ruston, Louisiana
Team	1	2	3	4	5	6	7	8	9	R	H	E
(2) NC State	1	0	1	1	0	0	3	2	0	8	14	1
(1) Louisiana Tech	0	0	0	0	0	0	0	3	0	3	8	0
WP: Sam Highfill (7–2) LP: Ryan Jennings (5–4) Sv: Evan Justice (10); Home runs: NCSU: None; LAT: Steele Netterville; Cole McConnell; Attendance: 2,817

Ruston Regional Championship
(1) Louisiana Tech	vs.	(2) NC State Wolfpack

June 6, 2021 7:00 pm (EDT) at J. C. Love Field at Pat Patterson Park in Ruston, Louisiana
Team	1	2	3	4	5	6	7	8	9	R	H	E
(1) Louisiana Tech	2	0	2	0	1	0	2	0	0	7	10	1
(2) NC State	0	0	2	1	6	4	0	1	X	14	19	1
WP: Matt Willadsen (5–2) LP: Greg Martinez (4–1) Sv: Chris Villaman (2); Home runs: LAT: Parker Bates (2); Hunter Wells; NCSU: Terrell Tatum; Luca Tresh; Devonte Brown; Attendance: 2,513

== Fayetteville Super Regional ==
Fayetteville Super Regional Game 1
NC State Wolfpack	vs.	(1) Arkansas Razorbacks

June 11, 2021 6:00 pm (EDT) at Baum–Walker Stadium in Fayetteville, Arkansas
Team	1	2	3	4	5	6	7	8	9	R	H	E
NC State	0	1	0	0	0	0	0	0	1	2	7	0
(1) Arkansas	0	3	4	0	3	6	0	5	X	21	17	0
WP: Patrick Wicklander (7–1) LP: Reid Johnston (8–3); Home runs: NCSU: Jose Torres; ARK: Robert Moore (2); Cullen Smith; Charlie Welch; Attendance: 11,084

Fayetteville Super Regional Game 2
(1) Arkansas Razorbacks	vs.	NC State Wolfpack

June 12, 2021 3:00 pm (EDT) at Baum–Walker Stadium in Fayetteville, Arkansas
Team	1	2	3	4	5	6	7	8	9	R	H	E
(1) Arkansas	0	2	0	0	0	0	3	0	0	5	4	0
NC State	0	0	1	4	0	1	0	0	X	6	8	1
WP: Sam Highfill (8–2) LP: Ryan Costeiu (8–3) Sv: Evan Justice (11); Home runs: ARK: Charlie Welch; Brady Slavens; NCSU: Jose Torres; Luca Tresh; Vojtech Mensik; Attendance: 11,084

Fayetteville Super Regional Championship
NC State Wolfpack	vs.	(1) Arkansas Razorbacks

June 13, 2021 6:00 pm (EDT) at Baum–Walker Stadium in Fayetteville, Arkansas
Team	1	2	3	4	5	6	7	8	9	R	H	E
NC State	0	0	2	0	0	0	0	0	1	3	8	1
(1) Arkansas	0	1	0	0	0	0	1	0	0	2	4	0
WP: Evan Justice (5–2) LP: Kevin Kopps (12–1); Home runs: NCSU: Jonny Butler; Jose Torres; ARK: Cayden Wallace; Attendance: 11,084

== College World Series ==
2021 College World Series Teams
NC State Wolfpack	(9) Stanford Cardinal	(5) Arizona Wildcats	(4) Vanderbilt Commodores	(3) Tennessee Volunteers	Virginia Cavaliers	(7) Mississippi State Bulldogs	(2) Texas Longhorns

First round	Second round
NC State	10
9	Stanford	4
NC State	1
4	Vanderbilt	0
5	Arizona	6
4	Vanderbilt	7^{12}
Bracket 1
9	Stanford	14
5	Arizona	5
9	Stanford	5
4	Vanderbilt	6
3	Tennessee	0
Virginia	6
Virginia	5
7	Mississippi State	6
7	Mississippi State	2
2	Texas	1
Bracket 2
3	Tennessee	4
2	Texas	8
2	Texas	6
Virginia	2

Semifinals
NC State	1	–
4	Vanderbilt	3	– (Note: Game declared no contest due to COVID-19 protocols with NC State. Vanderbilt advanced in the tournament.)
7	Mississippi State	5	4
2	Texas	8	3

Finals
4	Vanderbilt	8	2	0
7	Mississippi State	2	13	9

College World Series First Round
NC State Wolfpack	vs.	(9) Stanford Cardinal

June 19, 2021 2:00 pm (EDT) at TD Ameritrade Park in Omaha, Nebraska
Team	1	2	3	4	5	6	7	8	9	R	H	E
NC State	2	1	0	3	0	0	0	0	4	10	12	2
(9) Stanford	0	0	0	1	0	0	3	0	0	4	8	3
WP: Reid Johnston (9–3) LP: Brendan Beck (9–2) Sv: Evan Justice (12); Home runs: NCSU: Jonny Butler; Devonte Brown; STAN: Christian Robinson; Attendance: 22,193

College World Series Second Round
(4) Vanderbilt Commodores	vs.	NC State Wolfpack

June 21, 2021 7:00 pm (EDT) at TD Ameritrade Park in Omaha, Nebraska
Team	1	2	3	4	5	6	7	8	9	R	H	E
(4) Vanderbilt	0	0	0	0	0	0	0	0	0	0	2	0
NC State	0	0	0	0	1	0	0	0	0	1	4	0
WP: Sam Highfill (9–2) LP: Jack Leiter (10–4) Sv: Evan Justice (13); Home runs: VAN: None; NCSU: Terrell Tatum; Attendance: 23,712

College World Series Semifinals
NC State Wolfpack	vs.	(4) Vanderbilt Commodores

June 25, 2021 2:00 pm (EDT) at TD Ameritrade Park in Omaha, Nebraska
Team	1	2	3	4	5	6	7	8	9	R	H	E
NC State	0	0	0	0	1	0	0	0	0	1	8	2
(4) Vanderbilt	0	0	0	2	0	0	1	0	0	3	6	1
WP: Kumar Rocker (14-3) LP: Garrett Payne (0–1) Sv: Luke Murphy (9); Home runs: VAN: None; NCSU: None; Attendance: 20,538

== Ranking movements ==
Ranking movements Legend: ██ Increase in ranking ██ Decrease in ranking — = Not ranked RV = Received votes
	Week																			
Poll	Pre	1	2	3	4	5	6	7	8	9	10	11	12	13	14	15	16	17	18	Final
Coaches'	12	12*	—	—								RV	—	24	17	17				
Baseball America	17	17	15	—										23	15	16				
Collegiate Baseball^	13	13	13	—										25	18	22	12	7		
NCBWA†	11	11	8	25	—						RV	RV	RV	27	25	23	12			
D1Baseball	13	13	13	—										23	16	16				

^ Collegiate Baseball ranked 40 teams in their preseason poll, but only ranked 30 teams weekly during the season.
† NCBWA ranks 30 teams in their preseason poll, but only ranks 25 teams weekly during the season.
* A new poll was not released for this week, so for comparison purposes, the previous week's ranking is inserted in this week's slot.

== 2021 MLB draft ==
Player	Position	Round	Overall	MLB team
Tyler McDonough	INF/OF	3	75	Boston Red Sox
Jose Torres	SS	3	89	Cincinnati Reds
Evan Justice	LHP	5	140	Colorado Rockies
Austin Murr	1B	6	165	Detroit Tigers
Jonny Butler	OF	14	428	Oakland Athletics
Terrell Tatum	OF	16	485	Chicago White Sox
Luca Tresh	C	17	499	Kansas City Royals
Reid Johnston	RHP	19	576	Cleveland Indians
