= Stephen Schoch =

College baseball pitcher, podcaster (born 1996)

Stephen Schoch (pronounced "shock"; born December 5, 1996) is an American former college baseball pitcher and current host of the Schoch Factor podcast.

== Playing career ==
Schoch grew up in Laurel, Maryland, and attended Our Lady of Good Counsel High School, where he lettered in baseball in all four years. During the regular season of his senior season, Schoch recorded a 0.00 ERA in 53 1/3 innings, striking out 45 batters and walking three. Schoch adopted a submarine-style pitching motion as a freshman in high school, which he believed would make him more attractive to college teams.

In 2016, Schoch played for the Appalachian State Mountaineers, where he posted a 4.46 ERA in 34 1/3 innings. After the Mountaineers changed coaches following the 2016–17 season, he transferred to the University of Maryland, Baltimore County (UMBC). He sat out the 2017–18 season due to NCAA transfer rules, then pitched for the Retrievers for two seasons. He holds UMBC's record for saves in a single season (10, in 2018) and overall (13).

In the summer of 2017, Schoch pitched for the Bethesda Big Train of the Cal Ripken Collegiate Baseball League, where he allowed no runs in 26 1/3 innings, struck out 33 and walked no batters. In 2017 and 2018, he played collegiate summer baseball with the Cotuit Kettleers of the Cape Cod Baseball League, and was named a league All-Star in 2018 and the Most Valuable Pitcher for the Kettleers. After clinching the championship for the Big Train, Schoch adopted the habit of throwing his glove into the outfield after recording a save.

After transferring to the University of Virginia, Schoch played for the Cavaliers during the 2019–2020 and 2020–21 seasons, the latter season as a graduate student pursuing a master's degree in higher education. After pitching the final 2 1/3 innings against South Carolina in the 2021 College World Series, getting 5 strikeouts, Schoch gave a television interview that went viral. On the ACC Network, Schoch told a reporter that a fan offered him free Dippin' Dots if he blew the save, about his fear of caves, and about the profane way he motivates himself on the mound. The interviewer lightheartedly compared him with fictional pitcher Kenny Powers of the show Eastbound & Down. Schoch earned the save, and Dippin' Dots sent the Cavaliers a box of ice cream. MLB.com called Schoch "the NCAA's most entertaining pitcher".

== Media career ==
To supplement his partial scholarship, Schoch worked as a landscaper, as a delivery driver for Instacart and DoorDash, and selling insurance in a call center. After discovering Rube Waddell through a podcast, Schoch went into college baseball broadcasting himself. He met Jake Mintz and Jordan Shusterman, of Céspedes Family BBQ fame. Kyle Peterson, founder of D1 Baseball, started The Schoch Factor podcast, with Mintz and Shusterman as co-hosts. Schoch has been praised for his enthusiasm and relatability as a podcaster. He supplements his time reporting on college baseball with a full-time job in real estate.
