= 2021 UCLA Bruins baseball team =

2021 season of the University of California, Los Angeles baseball team

2021 UCLA Bruins baseball

Lubbock Regional, 2–2
- Conference: Pac-12 Conference

Ranking
- Coaches: No. 21
- CB: No. 20
- Record: 37–20 (18–12 Pac-12)
- Head coach: John Savage (16th season)
- Hitting coach: Bryant Ward (6th season)
- Pitching coach: Rex Peters (10th season)
- Home stadium: Jackie Robinson Stadium

2021 Pac-12 Conference baseball standings
	Conf.				Overall
Team	W		L	PCT	W		L	PCT
No. 5 Arizona ‍†‍‍^{y}	21	–	9	.700	45	–	18	.714
No. 10 Oregon ‍‍‍^{y}	20	–	10	.667	39	–	16	.709
No. 7 Stanford ‍‍‍^{y}	17	–	10	.630	39	–	17	.696
No. 21 UCLA ‍‍‍^{y}	18	–	12	.600	37	–	20	.649
Arizona State ‍‍‍^{y}	16	–	14	.533	33	–	22	.600
Oregon State ‍‍‍^{y}	16	–	14	.533	37	–	24	.607
California ‍‍‍	15	–	15	.500	29	–	26	.527
Washington State ‍‍‍	13	–	17	.433	26	–	23	.531
USC ‍‍‍	13	–	17	.433	25	–	26	.490
Utah ‍‍‍	7	–	23	.233	17	–	33	.340
Washington ‍‍‍	6	–	21	.222	20	–	30	.400
† – Conference champion y – Invited to the NCAA tournament As of June 23, 2021; Rankings from D1Baseball

The 2021 UCLA Bruins baseball team represented the University of California, Los Angeles during the 2021 NCAA Division I baseball season. The Bruins played their home games at Jackie Robinson Stadium as a member of the Pac-12 Conference. They were led by head coach John Savage, in his 16th season at UCLA.

== Previous season ==
The 2020 UCLA Bruins baseball team notched a 13–2 (0–0) regular season record. The season prematurely ended on March 12, 2020, due to concerns over the COVID-19 pandemic.

== Game log ==
2021 UCLA Bruins baseball game log
Legend: = Win = Loss = Canceled Bold = UCLA team member * Non-conference game
Regular season (35–18)

February (4–3)
Date	Time (PT)	TV	Opponent	Rank	Stadium	Score	Win	Loss	Save	Attendance	Overall	P12	Sources
February 19	5:00 p.m.	P12LA	San Francisco*	No. 2	Jackie Robinson Stadium; Los Angeles, California	**L** 2–6	Bourassa (1–0)	**Karros (0–1)**	—	0	0–1	—	Box Score; Recap
February 20	2:00 p.m.	P12LA	San Francisco*	No. 2	Jackie Robinson Stadium	**W** 8–2	**Bergin (1–0)**	Mollerus (0–1)	—	0	1–1	—	Box Score; Recap
February 21	1:00 p.m.	P12LA	San Francisco*	No. 2	Jackie Robinson Stadium	**L** 3–8	Lee (1–0)	**Saum (0–1)**	Barron (1)	0	1–2	—	Box Score; Recap
February 23	5:00 p.m.	P12LA	Loyola Marymount*	No. 8	Jackie Robinson Stadium	**W** 5–2	**Mullen (1–0)**	Burge (0–2)	**Mora (1)**	0	2–2	—	Box Score; Recap
February 26	5:00 p.m.	P12LA	UC Irvine*	No. 8	Jackie Robinson Stadium	**W** 4–3	**Mora (1–0)**	Ibarra (0–1)	—	0	3–2	—	Box Score; Recap
February 27	1:00 p.m.	P12LA	at UC Irvine*	No. 8	Cicerone Field; Irvine, California	**L** 3–7	Frias (1–0)	**Bergin (1–1)**	—	0	3–3	—	Box Score; Recap
February 28	2:00 p.m.	P12LA	UC Irvine*	No. 8	Jackie Robinson Stadium	**W** 4–0	**Nastrini (1–0)**	Pinto (0–1)	—	0	4–3	—	Box Score; Recap

March (11–4)
Date	Time (PT)	TV	Opponent	Rank	Stadium	Score	Win	Loss	Save	Attendance	Overall	P12	Sources
March 2	5:00 p.m.	P12LA	Cal State Fullerton*	No. 8	Jackie Robinson Stadium	**W** 14–1	**Mullen (2–0)**	Rodriguez (0–1)	—	0	5–3	—	Box Score; Recap
March 5	5:00 p.m.	P12LA	Pepperdine	No. 8	Jackie Robinson Stadium	**W** 16–8					6–3	—	
March 6	2:00 p.m.	P12LA	at Cal State Fullerton*	No. 8	Jackie Robinson Stadium	**W** 6–1					7–3	—	
March 7	1:00 p.m.	P12LA	USC*	No. 8	Jackie Robinson Stadium	**W** 10–1					8–3	—	
March 9	5:00 p.m.	P12LA	Cal State Fullerton*	No. 6	Fullerton, CA	**W** 6–2					9–3	—	
March 12	6:00 p.m.	CPTV	at Cal Poly*	No. 6	San Luis Obispo, CA	**L** 4–5					9–4	—	
March 13	6:00 p.m.	CPTV	at Cal Poly*	No. 6	San Luis Obispo, CA	**W** 13–12					10–4	—	
March 14	1:00 p.m.	CPTV	at Cal Poly*	No. 6	San Luis Obispo, CA	**L** 5–8					10–5	—	
March 19	6:00 p.m.	P12LA	No. 17 Arizona	No. 11	Los Angeles, CA	**W** 3–2					11–5	1–0	
March 20	2:00 p.m.	P12LA	No. 17 Arizona	No. 11	Los Angeles, CA	**L** 3–7					11–6	1–1	
March 21	1:00 p.m.	P12LA	No. 17 Arizona	No. 11	Los Angeles, CA	**W** 11–3					12–6	2–1	
March 23	6:00 p.m.	P12LA	Loyola Marymount*	No. 10	Los Angeles, CA	**W** 13–6					13–6	—	
March 26	7:00 p.m.	P12LA	USC	No. 10	Los Angeles, CA	**L** 4–5					13–7	2–2	
March 27	6:00 p.m.	P12LA	USC	No. 10	Los Angeles, CA	**W** 6–3					14–7	3–2	
March 28	4:00 p.m.	P12LA	USC	No. 10	Los Angeles, CA	**W** 13–1					15–7	4–2	
March 30	6:00 p.m.	P12LA	Pepperdine*	No. 10	Los Angeles, CA	Cancelled					15–7	—	

April (9–6)
Date	Time (PT)	TV	Opponent	Rank	Stadium	Score	Win	Loss	Save	Attendance	Overall	P12	Sources
April 1	6:00 p.m.	P12LA	Washington	No. 9	Los Angeles, CA	**L** 6–8					15–8	4–3	
April 2	2:00 p.m.	P12LA	Washington	No. 9	Los Angeles, CA	**L** 6–7					15–9	4–4	
April 3	12:00 p.m.	P12LA	Washington	No. 9	Los Angeles, CA	**W** 13–2					16–9	5–4	
April 9	2:05 p.m.	P12LA	Stanford	No. 17	Stanford, CA	**L** 2–6					16–10	5–5	
April 10	2:05 p.m.	P12LA	Stanford	No. 17	Stanford, CA	**L** 6–11					16–11	5–6	
April 11	1:05 p.m.	P12LA	Stanford	No. 17	Stanford, CA	**W** 6–1					17–11	6–6	
April 13	6:00 p.m.	P12LA	Loyola Marymount*	No. 25	Los Angeles, CA	**W** 12–2					18–11	6–6	
April 16	6:00 p.m.	P12LA	Utah	No. 25	Los Angeles, CA	**W** 20–0					19–11	7–6	
April 17	2:00 p.m.	P12LA	Utah	No. 25	Los Angeles, CA	**W** 13–3					20–11	8–6	
April 18	1:00 p.m.	P12LA	Utah	No. 25	Los Angeles, CA	**W** 9–2					21–11	9–6	
April 20	3:00 p.m.	P12LA	Pepperdine*		Los Angeles, CA	**W** 5–4					22–11	9–6	
April 23	6:00 p.m.	P12LA	No. 14 Oregon		Eugene, OR	**L** 3–5					22–12	9–7	
April 24	2:00 p.m.	P12LA	No. 14 Oregon		Eugene, OR	**L** 2–3^{10}					22–13	9–8	
April 25	12:00 p.m.	P12LA	No. 14 Oregon		Eugene, OR	**W** 7–6^{10}					23–13	10–8	
April 30	7:00 p.m.	P12LA	Oregon State		Los Angeles, CA	**W** 6–5^{10}					24–13	11–8	

May (11–5)
Date	Time (PT)	TV	Opponent	Rank	Stadium	Score	Win	Loss	Save	Attendance	Overall	P12	Sources
May 1	6:00 p.m.	P12LA	Oregon State		Los Angeles, CA	**W** 2–0					25–13	12–8	
May 2	12:00 p.m.	P12LA	Oregon State		Los Angeles, CA	**L** 3–5					25–14	12–9	
May 7	6:05 p.m.	P12LA	Washington State	No. 25	Pullman, WA	**L** 2–5					25–15	12–10	
May 8	2:05 p.m.	P12LA	Washington State	No. 25	Pullman, WA	**W** 7–6					26–15	13–10	
May 9	1:05 p.m.	P12LA	Washington State	No. 25	Pullman, WA	**W** 16–7					27–15	14–10	
May 11	6:00 p.m.	P12LA	Loyola Marymount*	No. 22	Los Angeles, CA	**W** 9–8					28–15	14–10	
May 14	6:00 p.m.	P12LA	UC Santa Barbara*	No. 22	Los Angeles, CA	**L** 4–10					28–16	14–10	
May 15	2:00 p.m.	P12LA	UC Santa Barbara*	No. 22	Santa Barbara, CA	**W** 5–2					29–16	14–10	
May 16	2:00 p.m.	P12LA	UC Santa Barbara*	No. 22	Los Angeles, CA	**W** 11–3					30–16	14–10	
May 18	6:00 p.m.	P12LA	Nevada*	No. 18	Los Angeles, CA	**W** 11–3					31–16	14–10	
May 21	6:00 p.m.	P12LA	California	No. 18	Los Angeles, CA	**L** 2–14					31–17	14–11	
May 22	2:00 p.m.	P12LA	California	No. 18	Los Angeles, CA	**L** 2–4					31–18	14–12	
May 12	1:00 p.m.	P12LA	California	No. 18	Los Angeles, CA	**W** 7–4					32–18	15–12	
May 27	6:00 p.m.	P12LA	No. 21 Arizona State		Phoenix, AZ	**W** 21–9					33–18	16–12	
May 28	6:00 p.m.	P12LA	No. 21 Arizona State		Phoenix, AZ	**W** 8–5					34–18	17–12	
May 29	1:00 p.m.	P12LA	No. 21 Arizona State		Phoenix, AZ	**W** 3–0					35–18	18–12	

Postseason (2–2)

NCAA Lubbock Regional (2–2)
Date	Time (PT)	TV	Opponent	Rank	Stadium	Score	Win	Loss	Save	Attendance	Overall record	NCAAT record	Sources
June 4	4:00 p.m.	ESPNU	(3) North Carolina	(2) No. 21	Rip Griffin Park; Lubbock, Texas	**L** 4–5				4,606	35–19	0–1	
June 5	12:00 p.m.	ESPN2	(4) Army	(2) No. 21	Rip Griffin Park	**W** 13–6				4,737	36–19	1–1	
June 6	12:00 p.m.	ESPNU	(3) North Carolina	(2) No. 21	Rip Griffin Park	**W** 12–2				4,737	37–19	2–1	
June 6	4:30 p.m.	ESPN3	(1) No. 8 Texas Tech	(2) No. 21	Rip Griffin Park	**L** 2–8				4,737	37–20	2–2	

== Rankings ==
Ranking movements Legend: ██ Increase in ranking ██ Decrease in ranking — = Not ranked
	Week																			
Poll	Pre	1	2	3	4	5	6	7	8	9	10	11	12	13	14	15	16	17	18	Final
Coaches'	2	2*	10	6	13	11	9	17	25	—	—	25	22	21	—	21	21*			
Baseball America	2	14	9	8	23	17	15	—	—	—	—	—	—	—	—	21	21*			
Collegiate Baseball^	3	9	14	10	15	11	9	14	23	19	19	16	17	16	20	17	20			
NCBWA†	2	9	9	6	10	11	9	17	27	25	26	23	19	17	19	18	24			
D1Baseball	2	8	8	6	11	10	10	21	—	—	—	25	23	18	—	21	21*			

^ Collegiate Baseball ranked 40 teams in their preseason poll, but only ranked 30 teams weekly during the season.
† NCBWA ranks 30 teams in their preseason poll, but only ranks 25 teams weekly during the season.
* A new poll was not released for this week, so for comparison purposes, the previous week's ranking is inserted in this week's slot.

== 2021 MLB draft ==
UCLA had an NCAA-High ten players selected in the draft.

Player	Position	Round	Overall	MLB team
Matt McLain	SS	1	17	Cincinnati Reds
J.T. Schwartz	1B	4	111	New York Mets
Nick Nastrini	RHP	4	131	Los Angeles Dodgers
Kevin Kendall	SS	7	202	New York Mets
Noah Cardenas	C	8	249	Minnesota Twins
Jesse Bergin	RHP	11	329	Miami Marlins
Sean Mullen	RHP	11	341	Tampa Bay Rays
Adrian Chaidez	RHP	15	448	Houston Astros
Mikey Perez	SS	15	459	Minnesota Twins
Zach Pettway	RHP	16	486	Cleveland Indians
