= 2021 Fairfield Stags baseball team =

Baseball team season

2021 Fairfield Stags baseball

MAAC regular season champion

NCAA tournament, Austin Regional
- Conference: Metro Atlantic Athletic Conference
- CB: No. 25
- Record: 39–5 (33–1 MAAC)
- Head coach: Bill Currier (10th season)
- Assistant coaches: Brian Fay (3rd season); Jordan Tabakman (2nd season); Harry Sabo (1st season)
- Captains: Josh Arnold; Matt Ferriero
- Home stadium: Alumni Baseball Diamond

2021 Metro Atlantic Athletic Conference baseball standings
	Conf.				Overall
Team	W		L	PCT	W		L	PCT
Fairfield ‍†‍‍^{y}	33	–	1	.971	38	–	5	.884
Monmouth ‍‍‍	22	–	10	.688	24	–	13	.649
Rider ‍‍‡‍^{y}	18	–	16	.529	23	–	18	.561
Canisius ‍‍‍	17	–	13	.567	20	–	16	.556
Marist ‍‍‍	17	–	9	.654	18	–	11	.621
Niagara ‍‍‍	17	–	15	.531	16	–	17	.485
Siena ‍‍‍	14	–	22	.389	15	–	24	.385
Manhattan ‍‍‍	12	–	22	.353	12	–	24	.333
Quinnipiac ‍‍‍	7	–	21	.250	7	–	21	.250
Saint Peter's ‍‍‍	4	–	24	.143	4	–	24	.143
Iona ‍‍‍	3	–	11	.214	3	–	11	.214
† – Conference champion ‡ – Tournament champion y – Invited to the NCAA tournament As of June 6, 2021; Rankings from D1Baseball

The 2021 Fairfield Stags baseball team represented Fairfield University during the 2021 NCAA Division I baseball season. The Stags played their home games at Alumni Baseball Diamond as a member of the Metro Atlantic Athletic Conference. They were led by head coach Bill Currier, in his 10th season at Fairfield.

Fairfield qualified for the NCAA tournament for the first time since 2016, and qualified for the first time ever as an at-large team. They reached the Austin Regional final, before losing to Texas.

== Previous season ==
The 2020 Fairfield Stags baseball team notched a 2–9 (0–0) regular season record. The season prematurely ended on March 12, 2020, due to concerns over the COVID-19 pandemic.

== Game log ==
2021 Fairfield Stags baseball game log (39–5)
Regular season (33–1)
March (4–0)

Date	Time (ET)	TV	Opponent	Rank	Stadium	Score	Win	Loss	Save	Attendance	Overall	MAAC	
March 20	11:30 am	SSN	Canisius		Alumni Baseball Diamond; Fairfield, Connecticut	**W** 7–4	**McLoughlin (1–0)**	Warner (0–1)	**Grabek (1)**	26	1–0	1–0	Report
March 20	2:15 pm	SSN	Canisius		Alumni Baseball Diamond	**W** 13–4	**Sansone (1–0)**	Barberio (0–1)	—	25	2–0	2–0	Report
March 21	11:30 am	SSN	Canisius		Alumni Baseball Diamond	**W** 6–3	**Signore (1–0)**	Frank (0–1)	**Cafaro (1)**	50	3–0	3–0	Report
March 21	2:15 pm	SSN	Canisius		Alumni Baseball Diamond	**W** 8–0	**Noviello (1–0)**	Fron (0–1)	—	50	4–0	4–0	Report

April (22–0)

Date	Time (ET)	TV	Opponent	Rank	Stadium	Score	Win	Loss	Save	Attendance	Overall	MAAC	
April 2	12:00 pm	SSN	Iona		Alumni Baseball Diamond	**W** 4–2	**Sansone (2–0)**	Smith (1–2)	—	25	5–0	5–0	Report
April 2	2:30 pm	SSN	Iona		Alumni Baseball Diamond	**W** 4–2	**Noviello (2–0)**	Helmstetter (1–1)	**Grabek (2)**	25	6–0	6–0	Report
April 3	12:00 pm	SSN	Iona		Alumni Baseball Diamond	**W** 7–0	**Signore (2–0)**	Helmstetter (1–2)	—	25	7–0	7–0	Report
April 3	2:30 pm	SSN	Iona		Alumni Baseball Diamond	**W** 10–2	**McVeigh (1–0)**	Martin (1–2)	—	25	8–0	8–0	Report
April 7	12:00 pm	SSN	Quinnipiac		Alumni Baseball Diamond	**W** 6–3	**Grabek (1–0)**	DeCarr (0–2)	**Oliphant (1)**	25	9–0	9–0	Report
April 7	3:00 pm	SSN	Quinnipiac		Alumni Baseball Diamond	**W** 17–6 ^{(7)}	**Amone (1–0)**	Mazza (0–1)	—	25	10–0	10–0	Report
April 9	12:00 pm	SSN	Rider		Alumni Baseball Diamond	**W** 8–3	**Sansone (3–0)**	Audrey (2–2)	—	20	11–0	11–0	Report
April 9	3:00 pm	SSN	Rider		Alumni Baseball Diamond	**W** 10–0	**Noviello (3–0)**	Soporowski (3–1)	—	20	12–0	12–0	Report
April 10	12:00 pm	SSN	Rider		Alumni Baseball Diamond	**W** 5–0	**Signore (3–0)**	Doelling (2–1)	—	35	13–0	13–0	Report
April 10	3:00 pm	SSN	Rider		Alumni Baseball Diamond	**W** 6–0	**Cafaro (1–0)**	Williamson (1–1)	—	35	14–0	14–0	Report
April 14	12:00 pm	SSN	Quinnipiac		Alumni Baseball Diamond	**W** 2–1	**Grabek (2–0)**	Donnelly (2–2)	—	30	15–0	15–0	Report
April 14	3:00 pm	SSN	Quinnipiac		Alumni Baseball Diamond	**W** 5–2	**Oliphant (1–0)**	Mazza (0–2)	**Sansone (1)**	30	16–0	16–0	Report
April 17	12:00 pm	SSN	Monmouth		Alumni Baseball Diamond	**W** 3–2	**Sansone (4–0)**	Klepchick (2–2)	—	45	17–0	17–0	Report
April 17	3:00 pm	SSN	Monmouth		Alumni Baseball Diamond	**W** 8–2	**Noviello (4–0)**	Dombroski (2–1)	—	40	18–0	18–0	Report
April 18	12:00 pm	SSN	Monmouth		Alumni Baseball Diamond	**W** 4–3	**Oliphant (2–0)**	Miller (0–1)	—	40	19–0	19–0	Report
April 18	3:00 pm	SSN	Monmouth		Alumni Baseball Diamond	**W** 4–1	**Cafaro (2–0)**	Long (2–1)	**Grabek (3)**	45	20–0	20–0	Report
April 21	12:00 pm		at Saint Peter's		Joseph Jaroschak Field; Jersey City, New Jersey	**W** 20–2	**Ostensen (2–0)**	Mahady (2–2)	—	45	21–0	21–0	Report
April 21	3:00 pm		at Saint Peter's		Joseph Jaroschak Field	**W** 9–0	Forfeit				22–0	22–0	Report
April 23	12:00 pm		at Manhattan		Van Cortlandt Park; Riverdale, New York	**W** 16–4	**Sansone (5–0)**	Knight (1–4)	—	0	23–0	23–0	Report
April 23	3:00 pm		at Manhattan		Van Cortlandt Park	**W** 12–4	**Noviello (5–0)**	Mahoney (1–3)	—	0	24–0	24–0	Report
April 24	12:00 pm		at Manhattan	No. 23	Van Cortlandt Park	**W** 19–9	**Signore (4–0)**	Muratalla (0–4)	—	0	25–0	25–0	Report
April 24	3:00 pm		at Manhattan	No. 23	Van Cortlandt Park	**W** 8–4	**Grabek (3–0)**	Mahoney (1–3)	—	0	26–0	26–0	Report

May (7–1)

Date	Time (ET)	TV	Opponent	Rank	Stadium	Score	Win	Loss	Save	Attendance	Overall	MAAC	
May 1	12:00 pm	SSN	Siena	No. 23	Alumni Baseball Diamond	**W** 2–1	**Sansone (6–0)**	Bovair (3–4)	—	65	27–0	27–0	Report
May 1	3:00 pm	SSN	Siena	No. 23	Alumni Baseball Diamond	**W** 10–1	**Noviello (6–0)**	McCully (2–5)	—	75	28–0	28–0	Report
May 2	12:00 pm	SSN	Siena	No. 23	Alumni Baseball Diamond	**L** 1–6	Lumpinski (3–1)	**Signore (4–1)**	—	65	28–1	28–1	Report
May 2	12:00 pm	SSN	Siena	No. 23	Alumni Baseball Diamond	**W** 4–0	**Cafaro (3–0)**	Knapek (1–2)	—	65	29–1	29–1	Report
May 8	12:00 pm	ESPN3	at Niagara	No. 25	Bobo Field; Lewiston, New York	**W** 1–0	**Sansone (7–0)**	Bruning (3–2)	—	87	30–1	30–1	Report
May 8	3:00 pm	ESPN3	at Niagara	No. 25	Bobo Field	**W** 4–1	**Noviello (7–0)**	Jones (1–1)	**Oliphant (3)**	85	31–1	31–1	Report
May 9	12:00 pm	ESPN3	at Niagara	No. 25	Bobo Field	**W** 10–8	**Fitzgerald (1–0)**	Hospital (2–1)	**Grabek (4)**	86	32–1	32–1	Report
May 9	3:00 pm	ESPN3	at Niagara	No. 25	Bobo Field	**W** 8–5	**Cafaro (4–0)**	Smyth (0–2)	**McVeigh (1)**	71	33–1	33–1	Report

Postseason (7–4)
MAAC Tournament (5–2)

Date	Time (ET)	TV	Opponent	Rank	Stadium	Score	Win	Loss	Save	Attendance	Overall	MAACT	
May 20	11:00 am	ESPN+	vs. (8) Manhattan; Quarterfinals – Game 1	(1) No. 23	Alumni Baseball Diamond	**W** 2–1	**Sansone (8–0)**	Muratalla (3–5)	**Cafaro (2)**	125	34–1	1–0	Report
May 20	2:30 pm	ESPN+	vs. (8) Manhattan; Quarterfinals – Game 2	(1) No. 23	Alumni Baseball Diamond	**W** 8–5	**Signore (5–1)**	Solimine (1–4)	—	125	35–1	2–0	Report
May 26	11:00 am	ESPN+	vs. (4) Canisius; Semifinals	(1) No. 23	Alumni Baseball Diamond	**L** 1–4	Duffy (3–0)	**Sansone (8–1)**	—	225	35–2	2–1	Report
May 27	11:00 am	ESPN+	vs. (2) Monmouth; Losers Semifinal	(1) No. 23	Alumni Baseball Diamond	**W** 3–1	**Noviello (8–0)**	Klepchick (4–4)	—	150	36–2	3–1	Report
May 28	9:30 am	ESPN+	vs. (4) Canisius; Losers Final	(1) No. 23	Alumni Baseball Diamond	**W** 8–2	**McLoughlin (2–0)**	Fron (1–3)	—	215	37–2	4–1	Report
May 28	1:30 pm	ESPN+	vs. (3) Rider; Finals – Game 1	(1) No. 23	Alumni Baseball Diamond	**L** 2–7	Papeo (4–2)	**Signore (5–2)**	Stalzer (6)	215	37–3	4–2	Report

NCAA Austin Regional (2–2)

Date	Time (ET)	TV	Opponent	Rank	Stadium	Score	Win	Loss	Save	Attendance	Overall	NCAAT	
June 4	7:00 pm	ESPN3	vs. (2) No. 19 Arizona State*; Regional First round	(3) No. 25	UFCU Disch–Falk Field; Austin, Texas	**L** 6–7	Glenn (6–2)	**Sansone (8–2)**	—	4,909	37–4	0–1	Report
June 5	2:00 pm	ESPN3	vs. (4) Southern*; Losers Regional semifinal	(3) No. 25	UFCU Disch–Falk Field	**W** 6–2	**Noviello (9–0)**	Guienze (1–6)	—	5,447	38–4	1–1	Report
June 6	2:00 pm	ESPN3	vs. (2) No. 19 Arizona State*; Losers Regional final	(3) No. 25	UFCU Disch–Falk Field	**W** 9–7	**Sansone (9–2)**	Corrigan (2–2)	**Signore (2)**	6,981	39–4	2–1	Report
June 7	2:00 pm	ESPN3	at (1) No. 4 Texas*; Regional final – Game 1	(3) No. 25	UFCU Disch–Falk Field	**L** 2–12	Hansen (9–1)	**Erbeck (0–1)**	—	6,853	39–5	2–2	Report

Legend: = Win = Loss = Tie = Canceled Bold = Rhode Island team member * Non-conference game
*Denotes non–conference game • Schedule source • Rankings based on the teams' current ranking in the NCBWA poll

== Rankings ==
Ranking movements Legend: ██ Increase in ranking ██ Decrease in ranking — = Not ranked RV = Received votes
	Week																
Poll	Pre	1	2	3	4	5	6	7	8	9	10	11	12	13	14	15	Final
Coaches'	—	—*	—	—	—	—	—	RV	RV	RV	RV	RV	RV	RV	RV	RV	
Baseball America	—	—	—	—	—	—	—	—	RV	RV	23	25	25	RV	RV	RV	
Collegiate Baseball^	—	—	—	—	—	—	—	RV	RV	RV	28	28	27	27	25	RV	
NCBWA†	—	—	—	—	—	—	—	—	—	RV	RV	RV	29	29	28	30	
D1Baseball	—	—	—	—	—	—	—	—	—	—	—	—	—	—	—	—	

^ Collegiate Baseball ranked 40 teams in their preseason poll, but only ranked 30 teams weekly during the season.
† NCBWA ranks 30 teams in their preseason poll, but only ranks 25 teams weekly during the season.
* A new poll was not released for this week, so for comparison purposes, the previous week's ranking is inserted in this week's slot.
