= 2021 NCAA Division I baseball rankings =

2021 NCAA Division I baseball season
- Duration: February 12, 2021 – June 30, 2021
- Number of teams: 300
- Preseason No. 1: Florida (Consensus)

Tournament
- Duration: June 4–30, 2021
- Most conference bids: SEC (9)

College World Series
- Champions: Mississippi State (1st title)
- Runners-up: Vanderbilt
- Winning coach: Chris Lemonis (1st title)
- MOP: Will Bednar (Mississippi State)

Seasons
- ← 2020 2022 →

The following human polls make up the 2021 NCAA Division I men's baseball rankings. The USA Today/ESPN Coaches Poll is voted on by a panel of 31 Division I baseball coaches. The Baseball America poll is voted on by staff members of the Baseball America magazine. These polls, along with the Perfect Game USA poll, rank the top 25 teams nationally. Collegiate Baseball and the National Collegiate Baseball Writers Association rank the top 30 teams nationally.

== Legend ==
	Increase in ranking
	Decrease in ranking
	Not ranked previous week
Italics	Number of first place votes
(#–#)	Win–loss record
т	Tied with team above or below also with this symbol

== ESPN/USA Today Coaches Poll ==
	Preseason Feb 4	Week 2 Mar 1	Week 3 Mar 8	Week 4 Mar 15	Week 5 Mar 22	Week 6 Mar 29	Week 7 Apr 5	Week 8 Apr 12	Week 9 Apr 19	Week 10 Apr 26	Week 11 May 3	Week 12 May 10	Week 13 May 17	Week 14 May 24	Week 15 May 31	Final Jul 1	
1.	Florida (24)	Arkansas (7–0) (20)	Arkansas (10–0) (26)	Arkansas (12–1) (24)	Vanderbilt (15–3) (22)	Vanderbilt (19–3) (23)	Vanderbilt (23–3) (31)	Arkansas (26–5) (31)	Arkansas (30–6) (30)	Arkansas (32–7) (28)	Arkansas (34–8) (32)	Arkansas (36–9) (31)	Arkansas (39–10) (32)	Arkansas (42–10) (32)	Arkansas (46–10) (32)	Mississippi State (50–18)	1.
2.	UCLA (2)	Vanderbilt (6–1) (10)	Vanderbilt (9–1) (6)	Vanderbilt (12–2) (7)	Arkansas (14–3) (6)	Arkansas (19–3) (9)	Arkansas (22–4) (1)	Vanderbilt (25–5) (1)	Vanderbilt (28–6) (2)	Vanderbilt (31–7) (4)	Vanderbilt (32–9)	Vanderbilt (34–10) (1)	Vanderbilt (36–12)	Texas (40–13)	Tennessee (45–16)	Vanderbilt (49–18)	2.
3.	Vanderbilt (4)	Louisville (6–1)	Ole Miss (10–2)	Mississippi State (13–3)	Ole Miss (16–4) (1)	Ole Miss (20–4)	Ole Miss (21–6)	Tennessee (27–6)	Texas (30–8)	Texas (33–9)	TCU (33–10)	Mississippi State (35–11)	Texas (38–12)	Vanderbilt (39–13)	Vanderbilt (40–15)	Texas (50–17)т	3.
4.	Texas Tech	Ole Miss (5–2)	Mississippi State (8–3)	Ole Miss (13–3)	Mississippi State (16–4)	Texas Tech (19–4)	Tennessee (24–5)	Mississippi State (24–7)	Mississippi State (27–8)	Tennessee (32–9)	Mississippi State (32–10)	Texas (38–12)	Tennessee (39–13)	Tennessee (42–14)	Texas (42–15)	NC State (37–19)т	4.
5.	Ole Miss	Florida (6–2)	Florida (9–3)	Florida (13–4)	Florida (16–5) (2)	Louisville (16–6)	Mississippi State (20–7)	Texas (25–8)	Tennessee (26–8)	Mississippi State (29–10)	Texas (35–11)	Tennessee (37–11)	Texas Tech (33–12)	Texas Tech (35–13)	Arizona (40–15)	Tennessee (50–18)	5.
6.	Louisville (1)	Mississippi State (5–2)	UCLA (8–3)	Texas Tech (13–3)	Texas Tech (16–4) (1)	Tennessee (21–4)	Texas (20–8)	Ole Miss (24–8)	Texas Tech (29–8)	TCU (29–10)	Tennessee (34–11)	TCU (34–12)	Mississippi State (36–13)	Mississippi State (40–13)	Notre Dame (30–11)	Arizona (45–18)	6.
7.	Mississippi State	UC Santa Barbara (6–1)	Texas Tech (8–3)	Louisville (11–4)	Louisville (14–5)	Mississippi State (17–7)	TCU (20–7)	Texas Tech (22–7)	TCU (26–9)	Louisville (23–11)	Notre Dame (24–8)	Florida (33–14)	Oregon (33–11)	Arizona (38–14)	Texas Tech (36–15)т	Stanford (39–17)	7.
8.	Arkansas	LSU (6–1)	South Carolina (10–0)	Miami (FL) (8–4)	East Carolina (16–3)	Texas (17–7)	Texas Tech (20–6)	East Carolina (26–5)	East Carolina (26–5)	Oregon (24–9)	Texas Tech (30–11)	Texas Tech (31–11)	Florida (35–16)	Notre Dame (29–10)	Mississippi State (40–15)т	Arkansas (50–13)	8.
9.	LSU	TCU (5–2)	Oklahoma State (9–0)	East Carolina (13–2)	Tennessee (17–4)	UCLA (15–7)	East Carolina (22–5)	Louisville (20–10)	Louisville (22–11)	Notre Dame (20–8)	Florida (30–13)	Oregon (30–11)	Notre Dame (26–10)	Oregon (35–13)	Stanford (33–14)	Virginia (36–27)	9.
10.	Texas	UCLA (4–3)	Georgia Tech (8–3)	Tennessee (14–3)	Texas (14–6)	Georgia Tech (13–7)	Louisville (18–8)	TCU (22–9)	Ole Miss (26–10)	East Carolina (28–7)	Arizona (30–11)	Notre Dame (25–10)	Arizona (35–13)	East Carolina (38–13)	TCU (40–17)	Notre Dame (34–13)	10.
11.	TCU	Texas Tech (3–3)	TCU (8–3)	Oklahoma State (11–2)	UCLA (12–6)	TCU (16–7)	Florida (18–9)	South Carolina (21–9)	South Carolina (24–10)	Texas Tech (27–10)	Ole Miss (31–12)	East Carolina (33–10)	East Carolina (36–11)	Ole Miss (38–17)	Ole Miss (41–19)	Ole Miss (45–22)	11.
12.	NC State	South Carolina (6–0)	Louisville (7–4)	Texas (11–5)	TCU (13–7)	East Carolina (17–5)	South Carolina (19–7)	Oklahoma State (21–7–1)т	Notre Dame (18–7)	Florida (28–12)	East Carolina (30–9)	Arizona (32–13)	Ole Miss (36–15)	Stanford (31–13)	Oregon (37–14)	Texas Tech (39–17)	12.
13.	UC Santa Barbara	Georgia Tech (6–1)	Miami (FL) (5–4)	UCLA (10–5)	Georgia Tech (11–6)	Florida (16–8)	Oklahoma State (18–7)	Notre Dame (15–6)т	Oregon (22–8)	Arizona (27–11)	Oregon (27–11)	Stanford (26–10)	TCU (35–14)	Florida (35–19)	Florida (38–20)	East Carolina (44–17)	13.
14.	Virginia	Miami (FL) (3–3)	Tennessee (11–2)	Georgia Tech (9–5)	Notre Dame (9–3)	Notre Dame (11–4)	Notre Dame (12–5)	Oregon (19–7)	Florida (25–11)	Ole Miss (28–12)	Louisiana Tech (32–11)	Ole Miss (33–14)	Louisiana Tech (36–14)	TCU (36–16)	East Carolina (41–15)	Dallas Baptist (41–18)	14.
15.	Miami (FL)	Oklahoma State (6–0)	East Carolina (9–2)	LSU (14–3)	Oregon (10–4)	South Carolina (16–6)	Miami (FL) (16–8)	Louisiana Tech (24–7)	Louisiana Tech (26–9)	South Carolina (25–12)	Louisville (23–14)	Louisville (26–15)	Stanford (28–12)	UC Irvine (36–16)	Old Dominion (42–14)	Oregon (39–16)	15.
16.	Tennessee	East Carolina (6–1)	Oregon State (10–1)	TCU (10–6)	LSU (16–5)	Oklahoma State (15–6)	Georgia Tech (14–9)	Florida (21–11)	Stanford (22–7)	Stanford (22–7)	Stanford (24–9)	Louisiana Tech (33–12)	Florida State (28–19)	Southern Miss (35–17)	UC Irvine (40–16)	TCU (41–19)	16.
17.	Georgia Tech	Tennessee (7–2)	Arizona (10–2)	South Carolina (11–3)	Oklahoma State (12–5)	Oregon State (16–5)	UCLA (16–9)	Arizona (21–9)	Arizona (23–11)	Charlotte (29–11)	Pittsburgh (20–11)	Southern Miss (33–15)	Southern Miss (35–17)	NC State (28–15)	NC State (30–17)	Old Dominion (44–16)	17.
18.	Oklahoma State	Virginia (4–3)	Boston College (8–2)	Notre Dame (7–2)	Pittsburgh (11–4)	Miami (FL) (12–8)	Oregon State (20–6)	Stanford (19–6)	Pittsburgh (20–11)	Louisiana Tech (28–11)	South Carolina (26–15)	Pittsburgh (22–13)	South Carolina (31–18)	Gonzaga (32–15)	Louisiana Tech (40–18)	LSU (38–25)	18.
19.	Arizona	Oregon State (7–1)	Virginia Tech (7–2)	Oregon (8–3)	Michigan (9–2)	Louisiana Tech (17–6)	Louisiana Tech (20–7)	Virginia Tech (19–9)	Oklahoma State (21–10–1)	Pittsburgh (20–11)	Southern Miss (29–14)	Florida State (25–17)	Charlotte (37–16)	Charlotte (39–17)	Nebraska (31–12)	Nebraska (34–14)	19.
20.	South Carolina	North Carolina (6–1)	LSU (9–3)	Oregon State (11–3)	Oregon State (13–4)	Oregon (12–6)	Oregon (16–6)	Pittsburgh (17–10)	Old Dominion (27–7)	Oklahoma State (24–12)	Old Dominion (31–11)	Charlotte (35–14)	Gonzaga (30–13)	Louisiana Tech (36–16)	Southern Miss (37–19)	UC Irvine (43–18)	20.
21.	Florida State	Georgia (7–1)	Texas (7–5)	Arizona (12–4)	Florida State (10–6)	Arizona (16–7)	Florida State (15–9)	Georgia Tech (15–12)	Charlotte (25–10)	Florida State (20–15)	Florida State (23–16)	South Carolina (28–17)	UCLA (30–16)	Old Dominion (38–14)	UCLA (35–18)	Louisiana Tech (42–20)	21.
22.	West Virginia	Virginia Tech (5–1)	Florida Atlantic (8–2)	UC Santa Barbara (9–5)	Miami (FL) (9–7)	Florida State (12–8)	Arizona (18–8)	Old Dominion (24–6)	Virginia Tech (20–12)	Southern Miss (26–13)	Charlotte (31–14)	UCLA (27–15)	UC Irvine (33–15)	Florida State (29–21)	Gonzaga (33–17)	South Florida (31–30)	22.
23.	East Carolina	Boston College (5–1)	Alabama (10–2)	Arizona State (11–2)	South Carolina (12–6)	Michigan (11–4)	Stanford (16–5)т	Oregon State (21–10)	Michigan (18–7)	Georgia (26–13)	Gonzaga (27–13)	Indiana (23–10)	Louisville (26–18)	Arizona State (32–17)	Oklahoma State (35–17)	Southern Miss (40–21)	23.
24.	Georgia	Arizona (6–2)	UC Santa Barbara (6–5)	Michigan (7–1)	Alabama (15–5)	Stanford (14–3)	Michigan (13–5)т	Michigan (15–7)	Indiana State (20–8)	Nebraska (20–7)	Oklahoma State (25–14)	Old Dominion (33–13)	NC State (26–14)	South Carolina (33–20)	Florida State (30–22)	UCLA (37–20)	24.
25.	Wake Forest	Auburn (6–2)	Notre Dame (4–2)	Alabama (14–3)	North Carolina (12–6)	LSU (16–8)	Virginia Tech (15–9)	UCLA (17–11)	Miami (FL) (21–11)	Old Dominion (28–10)	UCLA (25–14)	UC Irvine (29–15)	Old Dominion (36–14)	Nebraska (29–11)	Charlotte (39–19)	Florida (38–22)	25.
	Preseason Feb 4	Week 2 Mar 1	Week 3 Mar 8	Week 4 Mar 15	Week 5 Mar 22	Week 6 Mar 29	Week 7 Apr 5	Week 8 Apr 12	Week 9 Apr 19	Week 10 Apr 26	Week 11 May 3	Week 12 May 10	Week 13 May 17	Week 14 May 24	Week 15 May 31	Final Jul 1	
		Dropped: No. 10 Texas; No. 12 NC State; No. 21 Florida State; No. 22 West Virginia; No. 25 Wake Forest	Dropped: No. 18 Virginia; No. 20 North Carolina; No. 21 Georgia; No. 25 Auburn	Dropped: No. 18 Boston College; No. 19 Virginia Tech; No. 21 Florida Atlantic	Dropped: No. 21 Arizona; No. 22 UC Santa Barbara; No. 23 Arizona State	Dropped: No. 18 Pittsburgh; No. 24 Alabama; No. 25 North Carolina	Dropped: No. 25 LSU	Dropped: No. 15 Miami (FL); No. 21 Florida State	Dropped: No. 21 Georgia Tech; No. 23 Oregon State; No. 25 UCLA	Dropped: No. 22 Virginia Tech; No. 23 Michigan; No. 24 Indiana State; No. 25 Miami (FL)	Dropped: No. 23 Georgia; No. 24 Nebraska	Dropped: No. 23 Gonzaga; No. 24 Oklahoma State	Dropped: No. 18 Pittsburgh; No. 23 Indiana	Dropped: No. 21 UCLA; No. 23 Louisville	Dropped: No. 23 Arizona State; No. 24 South Carolina	Dropped: No. 22 Gonzaga; No. 23 Oklahoma State; No. 24 Florida State; No. 25 Charlotte	

== Baseball America ==
	Preseason Jan 25	Week 1 Feb 22	Week 2 Mar 1	Week 3 Mar 8	Week 4 Mar 15	Week 5 Mar 22	Week 6 Mar 29	Week 7 Apr 5	Week 8 Apr 12	Week 9 Apr 19	Week 10 Apr 26	Week 11 May 3	Week 12 May 10	Week 13 May 17	Week 14 May 24	Week 15 May 30	Final July 1	
1.	Florida	Ole Miss (2–0)	Arkansas (7–0)	Arkansas (10–0)	Arkansas (12–1)	Arkansas (14–3)	Arkansas (19–3)	Arkansas (22–4)	Arkansas (26–5)	Arkansas (30–6)	Arkansas (32–7)	Arkansas (34–8)	Arkansas (36–9)	Arkansas (39–10)	Arkansas (42–10)	Arkansas (46–10)	Mississippi State (50–18)	1.
2.	UCLA	Virginia (2–1)	Mississippi State (5–2)	Mississippi State (8–3)	Mississippi State (13–3)	Mississippi State (16–4)	Vanderbilt (19–3)	Vanderbilt (23–3)	Louisville (20–10)	Mississippi State (27–8)	Vanderbilt (31–7)	Notre Dame (24–8)	Vanderbilt (34–10)	Vanderbilt (36–12)	Vanderbilt (39–13)	Vanderbilt (40–15)	Vanderbilt (49–18)	2.
3.	Texas Tech	Miami (FL) (2–1)	Vanderbilt (6–1)	Vanderbilt (9–1)	Vanderbilt (12–2)	Vanderbilt (15–3)	Ole Miss (20–4)	Ole Miss (21–6)	Mississippi State (24–7)	Vanderbilt (28–6)	Texas (33–9)	Vanderbilt (32–9)	Mississippi State (35–11)	Notre Dame (26–10)	Notre Dame (29–10)	Tennessee (45–16)	Texas (50–17)	3.
4.	Ole Miss	Vanderbilt (0–0)	Louisville (6–1)	Ole Miss (10–2)	Ole Miss (13–3)	Ole Miss (16–4)	Texas Tech (18–4)	Mississippi State (20–7)	Texas (25–8)	Louisville (22–11)	Mississippi State (29–10)	Mississippi State (32–10)	Notre Dame (25–10)	Texas (38–12)	Texas (40–13)	Notre Dame (30–11)	NC State (37–19)	4.
5.	Virginia	Louisville (3–0)	Ole Miss (5–2)	Miami (FL) (5–4)	Miami (FL) (8–4)	Florida (16–5)	Mississippi State (17–7)	Louisville (18–8)	Tennessee (27–6)	Texas (30–8)	Louisville (23–11)	TCU (33–10)	Tennessee (37–11)	Tennessee (39–13)	Tennessee (42–14)	Texas (42–15)	Arkansas (50–13)	5.
6.	Vanderbilt	Arkansas (2–0)	Miami (FL) (3–3)	Florida (9–3)	Florida (13–4)	Texas Tech (16–4)	Louisville (16–6)	Texas (20–8)	Vanderbilt (25–5)	Notre Dame (18–7)	Notre Dame (20–8)	Tennessee (34–11)	TCU (34–12)	Mississippi State (36–13)	Mississippi State (40–13)	Arizona (40–15)	Virginia (36–27)	6.
7.	Louisville	Florida (1–2)	Florida (6–2)	Georgia Tech (8–3)	Texas Tech (13–3)	Louisville (14–5)	Texas (17–7)	Tennessee (24–5)	Notre Dame (15–6)	Tennessee (29–8)	Tennessee (32–9)	Arizona (30–11)	Texas (38–12)	Texas Tech (33–12)	Texas Tech (35–13)	Stanford (32–14)	Stanford (39–17)	7.
8.	Mississippi State	Mississippi State (1–1)	Virginia (4–3)	UCLA (8–3)	Louisville (11–4)	East Carolina (16–3)	East Carolina (15–5)	East Carolina (22–5)	East Carolina (26–5)	East Carolina (26–5)	East Carolina (28–7)	Texas Tech (30–11)	Texas Tech (31–11)	Florida (35–16)	Arizona (38–14)	Mississippi State (40–15)	Tennessee (50–18)	8.
9.	Florida State	Florida State (2–1)	UCLA (4–3)	TCU (8–3)	East Carolina (11–2)	Texas (14–6)	Georgia Tech (13–7)	South Carolina (19–7)	Ole Miss (24–8)	South Carolina (24–10)	TCU (29–10)	Texas (35–11)	Florida (33–14)	Arizona (35–13)	East Carolina (38–13)	Texas Tech (36–15)	Arizona (45–18)	9.
10.	LSU	TCU (1–1)	TCU (5–2)	South Carolina (10–0)	Texas (11–5)	Georgia Tech (11–6)	Tennessee (21–4)	Florida (18–9)	South Carolina (21–9)	Texas Tech (26–8)	Arizona (27–11)	Florida (26–13)	Arizona (32–13)	East Carolina (36–11)	Stanford (30–13)	Ole Miss (41–19)	Notre Dame (34–13)	10.
11.	Miami (FL)	Duke (2–1)	Texas Tech (3–3)	Texas Tech (8–3)	Georgia Tech (9–5)	North Carolina (12–6)	South Carolina (16–6)	Texas Tech (19–6)	Texas Tech (21–7)	TCU (26–9)	Oregon (22–8)	Ole Miss (31–12)	Louisville (26–15)	Ole Miss (35–15)	Ole Miss (37–17)	TCU (36–16)	Texas Tech (39–17)	11.
12.	Texas	Texas Tech (0–2)	LSU (6–1)	Virginia Tech (7–2)	South Carolina (11–3)	Notre Dame (9–3)	Notre Dame (11–4)	Notre Dame (12–5)	Virginia Tech (19–9)	Ole Miss (26–10)	South Carolina (25–12)	Louisville (23–14)	East Carolina (33–10)	Florida State (28–19)	Florida (35–19)	Florida (38–20)	Ole Miss (45–22)	12.
13.	TCU	LSU (1–1)	South Carolina (6–0)	Boston College (8–2)	Virginia Tech (9–5)	Oregon (10–4)	Virginia Tech (13–8)	Virginia Tech (15–9)	Arizona (21–9)	Arizona (23–11)	Texas Tech (27–10)	East Carolina (30–9)	Florida State (25–17)	Oregon (33–11)	Oregon (35–13)	Oregon (37–14)	East Carolina (44–17)	13.
14.	Arkansas	UCLA (1–2)	Georgia Tech (6–1)	East Carolina (9–2)	North Carolina (10–4)	Pittsburgh (11–4)	Florida (16–8)	TCU (20–7)	Oregon (17–6)	Oregon (20–7)	Pittsburgh (20–11)	Florida State (23–16)	Stanford (26–10)	TCU (35–14)	UC Irvine (35–16)	Old Dominion (42–14)	Dallas Baptist (41–18)	14.
15.	Arizona	NC State (2–0)	UC Santa Barbara (6–1)	Louisville (7–4)	Notre Dame (7–2)	Florida State (10–6)	UCLA (15–7)	Georgia Tech (14–9)	TCU (22–9)	Virginia Tech (20–12)	Florida State (20–15)	South Carolina (26–15)	Oregon (30–11)	Louisiana Tech (37–13)	NC State (28–15)	UC Irvine (39–16)	Oregon (39–16)	15.
16.	Duke	South Carolina (3–0)	Virginia Tech (5–1)	Arizona (10–2)	Oregon (8–3)	Tennessee (17–4)	Arizona (16–7)	Arizona (18–8)	Louisiana Tech (25–7)	Pittsburgh (20–11)	Florida (28–12)	Pittsburgh (20–11)	Pittsburgh (22–13)	Charlotte (37–16)	Charlotte (39–17)	NC State (30–17)	Old Dominion (44–16)	16.
17.	NC State	Tennessee (3–0)	North Carolina (6–1)	Oregon State (10–1)	Arizona (12–4)	UCLA (12–6)	Pittsburgh (12–8)	Pittsburgh (13–9)	Pittsburgh (17–10)	Florida State (18–14)	Ole Miss (28–12)	Oregon (23–9)	Ole Miss (33–14)	Stanford (27–12)	Florida State (29–20)	East Carolina (41–15)	TCU (41–10)	17.
18.	South Carolina	Texas (0–2)	Boston College (5–1)	North Carolina (7–3)	Tennessee (14–3)	Miami (FL) (9–7)	Florida State (12–8)	Florida State (15–9)	Florida State (16–12)	Florida (25–11)	Louisiana Tech (29–11)	Louisiana Tech (33–11)	Louisiana Tech (34–12)	UC Irvine (33–15)	Old Dominion (38–14)	Florida State (30–21)	UC Irvine (43–18)	18.
19.	Tennessee	UC Santa Barbara (2–1)	East Carolina (6–1)	Oklahoma State (9–0–1)	Pittsburgh (9–4)	Michigan (9–2)	Oregon (10–5)	Oregon (14–5)	Florida (21–11)	Louisiana Tech (27–9)	Charlotte (29–11)	Stanford (24–9)	Charlotte (35–14)	Louisville (26–18)	Nebraska (29–11)	Nebraska (31–12)	Florida (38–22)	19.
20.	Michigan	Michigan (0–0)	Texas (3–4)	Texas (7–5)	Michigan (7–1)	South Carolina (12–6)	Miami (FL) (12–8)	Miami (FL) (16–8)	Oklahoma State (22–7–1)	Georgia Tech (17–14)	UC Irvine (21–11)	Old Dominion (31–11)	Southern Miss (33–14)	Old Dominion (36–14)	Gonzaga (32–15)	Louisiana Tech (40–18)	Nebraska (34–14)	20.
21.	UC Santa Barbara	Georgia Tech (2–1)	Michigan (0–0)	Virginia (6–4)	Boston College (8–5)	Arizona (13–6)	North Carolina (13–7)	Oregon State (20–6)	Georgia Tech (15–12)	Stanford (22–7)	Stanford (22–7)	Charlotte (31–14)	Indiana (23–10)	South Carolina (31–18)	TCU (36–16)	UCLA (35–18)	LSU (38–25)	21.
22.	Georgia Tech	Alabama (3–0)	Tennessee (7–2)	Michigan (2–1)	Alabama (14–3)	Virginia Tech (10–8)	TCU (16–7)	Louisiana Tech (21–7)	Stanford (19–6)	Oregon State (24–10)	Georgia (26–13)	Southern Miss (29–14)	UC Irvine (29–15)	Southern Miss (35–17)	Louisiana Tech (37–15)	Oklahoma State (35–17)	Louisiana Tech (42–20)	22.
23.	Oklahoma	Arizona (1–2)	Alabama (7–1)	Tennessee (11–2)	UCLA (10–5)	Alabama (15–5)	Louisiana Tech (18–6)	Oklahoma State (19–7–1)	Oregon State (21–10)	Michigan (18–7)	Fairfield (25–0)	Indiana (20–9)	Old Dominion (33–13)	Michigan (25–13)	Southern Miss (33–14)	Southern Miss (37–19)	Southern Miss (40–21)	23.
24.	UCF	East Carolina (3–0)	Arizona (6–2)	Alabama (10–2)	TCU (10–6)	TCU (13–7)	Michigan (11–4)	Michigan (13–5)	Michigan (15–7)	Indiana State (20–8)	Nebraska (20–7)	UC Irvine (23–13)	South Carolina (28–17)	NC State (26–14)	Miami (FL) (32–17)	Duke (32–20)	UCLA (37–20)	24.
25.	Alabama	Oklahoma (0–1)	Oklahoma (4–3)	Florida Atlantic (8–2)	Oklahoma State (11–2–1)	Indiana State (11–6)	Indiana State (11–6)	Indiana State (13–7)	Indiana State (16–8)	Old Dominion (27–7)	Virginia Tech (21–15)	Fairfield (29–1)	Fairfield (33–1)	Gonzaga (30–13)	South Carolina (33–20)	Charlotte (39–19)	South Florida (31–30)	25.
	Preseason Jan 25	Week 1 Feb 22	Week 2 Mar 1	Week 3 Mar 8	Week 4 Mar 15	Week 5 Mar 22	Week 6 Mar 29	Week 7 Apr 5	Week 8 Apr 12	Week 9 Apr 19	Week 10 Apr 26	Week 11 May 3	Week 12 May 10	Week 13 May 17	Week 14 May 24	Week 15 May 30	Final July 1	
		Dropped: No. 24 UCF	Dropped: No. 9 Florida State; No. 11 Duke; No. 15 NC State	Dropped: No. 12 LSU; No. 15 UC Santa Barbara; No. 25 Oklahoma	Dropped: No. 17 Oregon State; No. 21 Virginia; No. 25 Florida Atlantic	Dropped: No. 21 Boston College; No. 25 Oklahoma State	Dropped: No. 23 Alabama	Dropped: No. 15 UCLA; No. 21 North Carolina	Dropped: No. 20 Miami (FL)	Dropped: No. 20 Oklahoma State	Dropped: No. 20 Georgia Tech; No. 22 Oregon State; No. 23 Michigan; No. 24 Indiana State; No. 25 Old Dominion	Dropped: No. 22 Georgia; No. 24 Nebraska; No. 25 Virginia Tech	None	Dropped: No. 16 Pittsburgh; No. 21 Indiana; No. 25 Fairfield	Dropped: No. 19 Louisville; No. 23 Michigan	Dropped: No. 20 Gonzaga; No. 24 Miami (FL); No. 25 South Carolina	Dropped: No. 18 Florida State; No. 22 Oklahoma State; No. 24 Duke; No. 25 Charlotte	

== Collegiate Baseball ==
	Preseason Dec 21	Week 1 Feb 22	Week 2 Mar 1	Week 3 Mar 8	Week 4 Mar 15	Week 5 Mar 22	Week 6 Mar 29	Week 7 Apr 5	Week 8 Apr 12	Week 9 Apr 19	Week 10 Apr 26	Week 11 May 3	Week 12 May 10	Week 13 May 17	Week 14 May 24	Week 15 May 31	Week 16 Jun 8	Week 17 Jun 14	Final Jul 1	
1.	Florida	Miami (FL) (2–1)	Arkansas (7–0)	Arkansas (10–0)	Arkansas (12–1)	Vanderbilt (15–3)	Vanderbilt (19–3)	Vanderbilt (23–3)	Arkansas (26–5)	Arkansas (30–6)	Arkansas (32–7)	Arkansas (34–8)	Arkansas (36–9)	Arkansas (39–10)	Arkansas (42–10)	Arkansas (46–10)	Arkansas (49–11)	Vanderbilt (45–15)	Mississippi State (50–18)	1.
2.	Vanderbilt	Vanderbilt (0–0)	Vanderbilt (5–1)	Vanderbilt (9–1)	Vanderbilt (12–2)	Florida (16–5)	Ole Miss (20–4)	Arkansas (22–4)	Vanderbilt (25–5)	Vanderbilt (28–6)	Vanderbilt (31–7)	Vanderbilt (32–9)	Vanderbilt (34–10)	Vanderbilt (36–12)	Vanderbilt (39–13)	Vanderbilt (40–15)	Vanderbilt (43–15)	Texas (47–15)	Vanderbilt (49–18)	2.
3.	UCLA	Florida (1–2)	Florida (6–2)	Florida (9–3)	Florida (13–4)	Ole Miss (16–4)	Texas Tech (19–4)	Texas (20–8)	Texas (25–8)	Texas (30–8)	Texas (33–9)	TCU (33–10)	Mississippi State (35–11)	Mississippi State (36–13)	Mississippi State (40–13)	Mississippi State (40–15)	Mississippi State (43–15)	Mississippi State (45–16)	Texas (50–17)	3.
4.	Texas Tech	Ole Miss (2–0)	Louisville (6–1)	Ole Miss (10–2)	Ole Miss (13–3)	Texas Tech (16–4)	Arkansas (19–3)	Tennessee (24–5)	Tennessee (27–6)	Mississippi State (27–8)	Mississippi State (29–10)	Mississippi State (32–10)	Texas (38–12)	Texas (38–12)	Texas (40–13)	Texas (42–15)	Texas (45–15)	Tennessee (50–16)	NC State (37–19)	4.
5.	Ole Miss	Arkansas (2–0)	Georgia (7–1)	South Carolina (10–0)	Texas Tech (13–3)	Arkansas (14–3)	Louisville (16–6)	South Carolina (19–7)	South Carolina (21–9)	TCU (26–9)	TCU (29–10)	Texas (35–11)	TCU (34–12)	TCU (35–14)	Tennessee (42–14)	Tennessee (45–16)	Tennessee (48–16)	Arizona (45–16)	Stanford (39–17)	5.
6.	Miami (FL)	Louisville (3–0)	Ole Miss (5–2)	Texas Tech (8–3)	Mississippi State (13–3)	Mississippi State (16–4)	Texas (17–7)	TCU (20–7)	TCU (22–9)	Tennessee (29–8)	Tennessee (32–9)	Tennessee (34–11)	Tennessee (37–11)	Tennessee (39–13)	Arizona (38–14)	Arizona (40–15)	Arizona (43–15)	Stanford (38–15)	Virginia (36–27)	6.
7.	LSU	Georgia (3–1)	UC Santa Barbara (6–1)	Georgia (9–3)	Georgia (13–3)	Louisville (14–5)	Tennessee (21–4)	Louisville (18–8)	Louisville (20–10)	South Carolina (24–10)	South Carolina (25–12)	Florida (30–13)	Florida (33–14)	Florida (35–16)	Notre Dame (29–10)	Notre Dame (30–11)	Notre Dame (33–11)	NC State (35–18)	Tennessee (50–18)	7.
8.	UC Santa Barbara	UC Santa Barbara (2–1)	LSU (6–1)	Mississippi State (8–3)	East Carolina (13–2)	East Carolina (16–3)	South Carolina (16–6)	Ole Miss (21–6)	Ole Miss (24–8)	Louisville (22–11)	Louisville (23–11)	Arizona (30–11)	Louisville (26–15)	Arizona (35–13)	TCU (36–16)	TCU (40–17)	Stanford (36–15)	Virginia (35–25)	Arizona (45–18)	8.
9.	Mississippi State	UCLA (1–2)	Miami (FL) (3–3)	East Carolina (9–2)	Oklahoma State (11–2–1)	Texas (14–6)	UCLA (15–7)	Florida (18–9)	Texas Tech (22–7)	Ole Miss (26–10)	Florida (28–12)	Ole Miss (31–12)	Texas Tech (31–11)	Oregon (33–11)	Stanford (31–13)	Stanford (33–14)	Texas Tech (39–15)	Arkansas (50–13)	Arkansas (50–13)	9.
10.	Arizona	Texas Tech (0–2)	Mississippi State (5–2)	UCLA (8–3)	LSU (14–3)	Michigan (9–2)	Florida (16–8)	Texas Tech (20–6)	Oklahoma State (21–7–1)	Texas Tech (26–8)	Arizona (27–11)	Notre Dame (24–8)	Stanford (26–10)	Texas Tech (33–12)	Oregon (35–13)	Oregon (37–14)	East Carolina (44–15)	Notre Dame (34–13)	Notre Dame (34–13)	10.
11.	Louisville	LSU (1–1)	Oklahoma State (6–0)	Oklahoma State (9–0–1)	Louisville (11–4)	UCLA (12–6)	Oklahoma State (15–6–1)	Oklahoma State (18–7–1)	Mississippi State (24–7)	East Carolina (26–5)	Oregon (24–9)	Texas Tech (30–11)	Arizona (32–13)	East Carolina (36–11)	Texas Tech (35–13)	Texas Tech (36–15)	Ole Miss (44–20)	Texas Tech (39–17)	Texas Tech (39–17)	11.
12.	Georgia	Mississippi State (1–1)	East Carolina (6–1)	Georgia Tech (8–3)	Arizona State (11–2)	Georgia (14–5)	Mississippi State (17–7)	Mississippi State (20–7)	East Carolina (26–5)	Florida (25–11)	Ole Miss (28–12)	South Carolina (26–15)	Oregon (30–11)	Ole Miss (36–15)	Florida (35–19)	Florida (38–20)	NC State (33–17)	East Carolina (44–17)	East Carolina (44–17)	12.
13.	NC State	NC State (2–0)	South Carolina (6–0)	Arizona (10–2)	Michigan (7–1)	Oklahoma State (12–5–1)	Oregon State (16–5)	Oregon State (20–6)	Arizona (21–9)	Stanford (22–7)	Stanford (22–7)	Louisville (23–14)	East Carolina (33–10)	Notre Dame (26–10)	East Carolina (38–13)	East Carolina (41–15)	Dallas Baptist (40–16)	Ole Miss (45–22)	Ole Miss (45–22)	13.
14.	Virginia	Virginia (2–1)	UCLA (4–3)	Louisville (7–4)	Texas (11–5)	LSU (16–5)	Arizona State (15–5)	UCLA (16–9)	Florida (21–11)	Notre Dame (18–7)	Notre Dame (20–8)	Stanford (24–9)	Ole Miss (33–14)	Stanford (28–12)	Ole Miss (38–17)	Ole Miss (41–19)	LSU (38–23)	Dallas Baptist (41–18)	Dallas Baptist (41–18)	14.
15.	Arizona State	Arizona State (2–1)	Texas Tech (3–3)	LSU (9–3)	UCLA (10–5)	Oregon (10–4)	East Carolina (17–5)	East Carolina (22–5)	Stanford (19–6)	Oregon (22–8)	Texas Tech (27–10)	Oregon (27–11)	Notre Dame (25–10)	South Carolina (31–18)	UC Irvine (36–16)	UC Irvine (40–16)	Virginia (33–24)	LSU (38–25)	LSU (38–25)	15.
16.	East Carolina	East Carolina (3–0)	Georgia Tech (6–1)	Miami (FL) (5–4)	Miami (FL) (8–4)	Arizona State (12–5)	Michigan (11–4)	Arizona (18–8)	Notre Dame (15–6)	Arizona (23–11)	East Carolina (28–7)	UCLA (25–14)	South Carolina (28–17)	UCLA (30–16)	South Carolina (33–20)	South Carolina (33–21)	South Florida (31–28)	South Florida (31–30)	South Florida (31–30)	16.
17.	Oklahoma State	Oklahoma State (1–0)	North Carolina (6–1)	Oregon State (10–1)	North Carolina (10–4)	North Carolina (12–6)	Notre Dame (11–4)	Michigan (13–5)	Oregon (19–7)	Michigan (18–7)	Pittsburgh (20–11)	Pittsburgh (20–11)	UCLA (27–15)	UC Irvine (33–15)	Georgia Tech (28–21)	UCLA (35–18)	Oregon (39–16)	Oregon (39–16)	Oregon (39–16)	17.
18.	Michigan	Michigan (0–0)	Michigan (0–0)	Arizona State (8–2)	South Carolina (11–3)	Pittsburgh (11–4)	Georgia Tech (13–7)	Arizona State (16–7)	Michigan (15–7)	Pittsburgh (20–11)	Oklahoma State (24–12–1)	East Carolina (30–9)	UC Irvine (29–15)	Louisville (26–18)	NC State (28–15)	Nebraska (31–12)	TCU (41–19)	TCU (41–19)	TCU (41–19)	18.
19.	TCU	TCU (1–1)	TCU (5–2)	Michigan (2–1)	Oregon (8–3)	Georgia Tech (11–6)	Arizona (16–7)	Notre Dame (12–5)	Arizona State (18–9)	UCLA (21–11)	UCLA (23–13)	Louisiana Tech (32–11)	Pittsburgh (22–13)	Gonzaga (30–13)	Arizona State (32–17)	Duke (32–20)	UC Irvine (43–18)	UC Irvine (43–18)	UC Irvine (43–18)	19.
20.	Texas	South Carolina (3–0)	Stetson (9–0)	TCU (8–3)	Georgia Tech (9–5)	Oregon State (13–4)	North Carolina (13–7)	Oregon (16–6)	Georgia (20–11)	Oklahoma State (21–10–1)	Georgia (26–13)	Oklahoma State (25–14–1)	Louisiana Tech (33–12)	Louisiana Tech (36–14)	UCLA (32–18)	Oklahoma State (35–17–1)	UCLA (37–20)	UCLA (37–20)	UCLA (37–20)	20.
21.	South Carolina	Dallas Baptist (2–0)	Oregon State (7–1)	Oregon (6–2)	Arizona (12–4)	Notre Dame (9–3)	Kentucky (17–4)	Miami (FL) (16–8)	Pittsburgh (17–10)	Georgia (23–12)	Nebraska (20–7)	Arizona State (25–14)	Oklahoma State (27–15–1)	Oklahoma State (30–16–1)	Miami (FL) (32–17)	Georgia Tech (29–23)	Nebraska (34–14)	Nebraska (34–14)	Nebraska (34–14)	21.
22.	Arkansas	Clemson (3–0)	Arizona State (4–2)	Virginia Tech (7–2)	Oregon State (11–3)	Southern Illinois (17–1)	Oregon (12–6)	Georgia Tech (14–9)	Louisiana Tech (24–7)	Oregon State (24–10)	Michigan (19–9)	Michigan (21–11)	Arizona State (27–15)	Arizona State (30–16)	Oklahoma State (32–16–1)	NC State (30–17)	Georgia Tech (31–25)	Georgia Tech (31–25)	Georgia Tech (31–25)	22.
23.	Coastal Carolina	Alabama (3–0)	Alabama (7–1)	North Carolina (7–3)	Notre Dame (7–2)	Arizona (13–6)	Georgia (16–7)	Georgia (18–9)	UCLA (17–11)	Arizona State (19–11)	UC Irvine (24–12)	UC Irvine (26–14)	Michigan (23–12)	Michigan (25–13)	Charlotte (39–17)	Arizona State (32–20)	UC Santa Barbara (41–20)	UC Santa Barbara (41–20)	UC Santa Barbara (41–20)	23.
24.	Dallas Baptist	Arizona (1–2)	Arizona (6–2)	Alabama (10–2)	Alabama (14–3)	Alabama (15–5)	Stanford (14–3)	Sacramento State (18–6)	Sacramento State (21–7)	UC Irvine (22–11)	Oregon State (26–12)	Tulane (24–14)	Charlotte (35–14)	Charlotte (37–16)	Nebraska (29–11)	Old Dominion (42–14)	Oklahoma State (36–19–1)	Oklahoma State (36–19–1)	Oklahoma State (36–19–1)	24.
25.	Clemson	Florida State (2–1)	Virginia (4–3)	Southern Illinois (11–0)	Texas A&M (14–4)	Florida State (10–6)	TCU (16–7)	Stanford (16–5)	UC Irvine (19–10)	UC Santa Barbara (24–10)	Charlotte (29–11)	UC Santa Barbara (29–13)	Georgia Tech (24–18)	NC State (26–14)	Fairfield (35–1)	Louisiana Tech (40–18)	South Alabama (36–22)	South Alabama (36–22)	South Alabama (36–22)	25.
26.	Texas A&M	Auburn (3–0)	Auburn (6–2)	UC Santa Barbara (6–5)	UC Santa Barbara (9–5)	Stanford (12–3)	UC Irvine (14–7)	UC Irvine (16–9)	UC Santa Barbara (21–9)	Stony Brook (19–8)	Arizona State (22–13)	Gonzaga (27–13)	Gonzaga (27–13)	Georgia Tech (25–20)	Michigan (26–15)	Central Michigan (40–16)	Old Dominion (44–16)	Old Dominion (44–16)	Old Dominion (44–16)	26.
27.	Alabama	Tennessee (3–0)	Virginia Tech (5–1)	Florida Atlantic (8–2)	Southern Illinois (14–1)	Tennessee (17–4)	Indiana (11–3)	San Diego (19–5)	Ball State (19–9)	Miami (FL) (21–11)	UC Santa Barbara (26–12)	Clemson (21–18)	Fairfield (33–1)	Fairfield (33–1)	Louisiana Tech (36–16)	VCU (37–14)	South Carolina (34–23)	South Carolina (34–23)	South Carolina (34–23)	27.
28.	Florida State	Duke (2–1)	Pittsburgh (6–1)	Tennessee (11–2)	Pittsburgh (9–4)	Indiana (9–2)	Southern Illinois (19–3)	Florida State (15–9)	Wichita State (19–9)	Nebraska (18–6)	Fairfield (26–0)	Fairfield (29–1)	Dallas Baptist (29–11)	VCU (32–14)	VCU (34–14)	Miami (FL) (32–19)	Fairfield (39–5)	Fairfield (39–5)	Fairfield (39–5)	28.
29.	Southern Miss	San Francisco (2–1)	Tennessee (7–2)	Dallas Baptist (8–3)	Tennessee (14–3)	San Diego (13–4)	San Diego (17–4)	Nebraska (13–5)	Nebraska (15–6)	Charlotte (25–10)	Tulane (21–13)	Old Dominion (31–11)	Southern Miss (33–15)	Grand Canyon (34–17–1)	Gonzaga (32–15)	Charlotte (39–19)	Louisiana Tech (42–20)	Louisiana Tech (42–20)	Louisiana Tech (42–20)	29.
30.	Texas State	Ball State (2–1)	Dallas Baptist (5–2)	Ball State (6–4)	Indiana (7–1)	Hawaii (11–3)	Florida State (12–8)	Old Dominion (21–5)	Old Dominion (24–6)	Old Dominion (27–7)	South Alabama (24–13)	Central Michigan (28–11)	Florida State (25–17)	Florida State (28–19)	UConn (30–16)	UConn (33–17)	Central Michigan (42–18)	Central Michigan (42–18)	Central Michigan (42–18)	30.
	Preseason Dec 21	Week 1 Feb 22	Week 2 Mar 1	Week 3 Mar 8	Week 4 Mar 15	Week 5 Mar 22	Week 6 Mar 29	Week 7 Apr 5	Week 8 Apr 12	Week 9 Apr 19	Week 10 Apr 26	Week 11 May 3	Week 12 May 10	Week 13 May 17	Week 14 May 24	Week 15 May 31	Week 16 Jun 8	Week 17 Jun 14	Final Jul 1	
		Dropped: No. 20 Texas; No. 23 Coastal Carolina; No. 26 Texas A&M; No. 29 Southern Miss; No. 30 Texas State	Dropped: No. 13 NC State; No. 22 Clemson; No. 25 Florida State; No. 28 Duke; No. 29 San Francisco; No. 30 Ball State	Dropped: No. 20 Stetson; No. 25 Virginia; No. 26 Auburn; No. 28 Pittsburgh	Dropped: No. 20 TCU; No. 22 Virginia Tech; No. 27 Florida Atlantic; No. 29 Dallas Baptist; No. 30 Ball State	Dropped: No. 16 Miami (FL); No. 18 South Carolina; No. 25 Texas A&M; No. 26 UC Santa Barbara	Dropped: No. 14 LSU; No. 18 Pittsburgh; No. 24 Alabama; No. 30 Hawaii	Dropped: No. 20 North Carolina; No. 21 Kentucky; No. 27 Indiana; No. 28 Southern Illinois	Dropped: No. 13 Oregon State; No. 21 Miami (FL); No. 22 Georgia Tech; No. 27 San Diego; No. 28 Florida State	Dropped: No. 22 Louisiana Tech; No. 24 Sacramento State; No. 27 Ball State; No. 28 Wichita State	Dropped: No. 26 Stony Brook; No. 27 Miami (FL); No. 30 Old Dominion	Dropped: No. 20 Georgia; No. 21 Nebraska; No. 24 Oregon State; No. 25 Charlotte; No. 30 South Alabama	Dropped: No. 24 Tulane; No. 25 UC Santa Barbara; No. 27 Clemson; No. 29 Old Dominion; No. 30 Central Michigan	Dropped: No. 19 Pittsburgh; No. 28 Dallas Baptist; No. 29 Southern Miss	Dropped: No. 18 Louisville; No. 29 Grand Canyon; No. 30 Florida State	Dropped: No. 25 Fairfield; No. 26 Michigan; No. 29 Gonzaga	Dropped: No. 12 Florida; No. 19 Duke; No. 23 Arizona State; No. 27 VCU; No. 28 Miami; No. 29 Charlotte; No. 30 UConn	None	None	

The Preseason poll ranked the top 50 teams in the nation. Teams not listed above are: 31. Stetson; 32. UCF; 33. Pepperdine; 34. Georgia Tech; 35. Tennessee; 36. Duke; 37. Auburn; 38. Central Michigan; 39. Indiana; 40. Winthrop; 41. Oklahoma; 42. UC Irvine; 43. Tulane; 44. Long Beach State; 45. Wichita State; 46. Minnesota; 47. Notre Dame; 48. Houston; 49. Oregon State; 50. Stanford

== NCBWA ==
	Preseason Feb 2	Week 1 Feb 23	Week 2 Mar 1	Week 3 Mar 8	Week 4 Mar 15	Week 5 Mar 22	Week 6 Mar 29	Week 7 Apr 5	Week 8 Apr 12	Week 9 Apr 19	Week 10 Apr 26	Week 11 May 3	Week 12 May 10	Week 13 May 17	Week 14 May 24	Week 15 May 31	Week 16 Jun 8	Final Jul 1	
1.	Florida	Ole Miss (3–0)	Arkansas (7–0)	Arkansas (10–0)	Arkansas (12–1)	Vanderbilt (15–3)	Vanderbilt (19–3)	Vanderbilt (23–3)	Arkansas (26–5)	Arkansas (30–6)	Arkansas (32–7)	Arkansas (34–8)	Arkansas (36–9)	Arkansas (39–10)	Arkansas (42–10)	Arkansas (46–10)	Arkansas (49–11)	Mississippi State (50–18)	1.
2.	UCLA	Vanderbilt (2–0)	Vanderbilt (6–1)	Vanderbilt (9–1)	Vanderbilt (12–2)	Mississippi State (16–4)	Arkansas (19–3)	Arkansas (22–4)	Vanderbilt (25–5)	Vanderbilt (28–6)	Vanderbilt (32–7)	TCU (33–10)	Vanderbilt (34–10)	Texas (38–12)	Texas (40–13)	Texas (42–15)	Texas (45–15)	Vanderbilt (49–18)	2.
3.	Vanderbilt	Arkansas (3–0)	Louisville (6–1)	Ole Miss (10–2)	Mississippi State (13–3)	Arkansas (14–3)	Ole Miss (20–4)	Texas (20–8)	Texas (25–8)	Texas (30–8)	Texas (33–9)	Vanderbilt (32–9)	Mississippi State (35–11)	Vanderbilt (36–12)	Vanderbilt (39–13)	Tennessee (45–16)	Vanderbilt (43–15)	NC State (37–19)	3.
4.	Texas Tech	Louisville (3–0)	Florida (6–2)	Florida (9–3)т	Texas Tech (13–3)	Texas Tech (16–4)	Texas Tech (19–4)	Tennessee (24–5)	Tennessee (27–6)	Mississippi State (27–8)	Tennessee (32–9)	Mississippi State (32–10)	Texas (38–12)	Texas Tech (33–12)	Tennessee (42–14)	Vanderbilt (40–15)	Tennessee (48–16)	Texas (50–17)	4.
5.	Ole Miss	Miami (FL) (2–1)	Mississippi State (5–2)	Mississippi State (8–3)т	Ole Miss (13–3)	Ole Miss (16–4)	Louisville (16–6)	Ole Miss (21–6)	Mississippi State (24–7)	Tennessee (29–8)	Mississippi State (29–10)	Texas (35–11)	Tennessee (37–11)	Tennessee (39–13)	Texas Tech (35–13)	Arizona (40–15)	Arizona (43–15)	Stanford (39–17)	5.
6.	Louisville	Mississippi State (2–1)	Miami (FL) (3–3)	UCLA (9–3)	Florida (13–4)	Florida (16–5)	Texas (17–7)	Mississippi State (20–7)	East Carolina (26–5)	Texas Tech (26–8)	TCU (29–10)	Tennessee (34–11)	TCU (34–12)	Mississippi State (36–13)	Mississippi State (40–13)	TCU (40–17)	Texas Tech (39–15)	Virginia (36–27)	6.
7.	Mississippi State	Florida (1–2)	Ole Miss (5–2)	South Carolina (10–0)	East Carolina (13–2)	Louisville (14–5)	Tennessee (21–4)	Louisville (18–8)	Ole Miss (24–8)	East Carolina (26–5)	East Carolina (28–7)	Texas Tech (30–11)	Texas Tech (31–11)	Oregon (33–11)	Arizona (38–14)	Texas Tech (36–15)	Notre Dame (33–11)	Arizona (45–18)	7.
8.	Arkansas	NC State (2–0)	UC Santa Barbara (6–1)	Miami (FL) (5–4)	Miami (FL) (8–4)	East Carolina (16–3)	Mississippi State (17–7)	East Carolina (22–5)	Texas Tech (22–7)	TCU (26–9)	Florida (28–12)	Florida (30–13)	Florida (33–14)	Arizona (35–13)	Notre Dame (29–10)	Ole Miss (41–19)	Mississippi State (43–15)	Tennessee (50–18)	8.
9.	Texas	UCLA (1–2)	UCLA (4–3)	Texas Tech (8–3)	Louisville (11–4)	Texas (14–6)	UCLA (15–7)	TCU (20–7)	Louisville (20–10)	Ole Miss (26–10)	Louisville (23–11)	Notre Dame (24–8)	Oregon (30–11)	Notre Dame (26–10)	Oregon (35–13)	Oregon (37–14)	Stanford (36–15)	Arkansas (50–13)	9.
10.	Miami (FL)	LSU (2–1)	LSU (6–1)	Oklahoma State (9–0–1)	UCLA (10–5)	Tennessee (17–4)	East Carolina (17–5)	Texas Tech (20–6)	Oklahoma State (21–7–1)	Florida (25–11)	Arizona (27–11)	Arizona (30–11)	East Carolina (33–10)	East Carolina (36–11)	Ole Miss (38–17)	Notre Dame (30–11)	East Carolina (44–15)	Notre Dame (34–13)	10.
11.	NC Stateт	UC Santa Barbara (2–1)	Georgia Tech (6–1)	TCU (8–3)	Tennessee (14–3)	UCLA (12–6)	TCU (16–7)	Florida (18–9)	Notre Dame (15–6)	Louisville (22–11)	Texas Tech (27–10)	East Carolina (30–9)	Notre Dame (25–10)	TCU (35–14)	East Carolina (38–13)	Stanford (33–14)	Ole Miss (44–20)	Ole Miss (45–22)	11.
12.	TCUт	Virginia (2–1)	TCU (5–2)	Louisville (7–4)	Oklahoma State (11–2)	Georgia Tech (11–6)	Georgia Tech (13–7)	South Carolina (19–7)	TCU (22–9)	Notre Dame (18–7)	Oregon (24–9)	Ole Miss (31–12)	Arizona (32–13)	Florida (35–16)	Stanford (31–13)	Mississippi State (40–15)	NC State (33–17)	LSU (38–25)	12.
13.	LSU	Texas Tech (0–3)	South Carolina (6–0)	Georgia Tech (8–3)	LSU (14–3)	TCU (13–7)	Florida (16–8)	Oregon State (20–6)	Louisiana Tech (24–7)	South Carolina (24–10)	Notre Dame (20–8)	Oregon (27–11)	Louisville (26–15)	Ole Miss (36–15)	Florida (35–19)	Florida (38–20)	Dallas Baptist (40–16)	East Carolina (44–17)	13.
14.	UC Santa Barbara	TCU (1–2)	Oklahoma State (6–0)	East Carolina (9–2)	Texas (11–5)	Oregon State (13–4)	Oregon State (16–5)	Oklahoma State (18–7–1)	South Carolina (21–9)	Oregon (22–8)	South Carolina (25–12)	Louisiana Tech (32–11)	Stanford (26–10)	Stanford (28–12)	TCU (36–16)	Old Dominion (42–14)	Virginia (33–24)	Dallas Baptist (41–18)	14.
15.	Virginia	Tennessee (3–0)	Texas Tech (3–3)	Tennessee (11–2)	South Carolina (11–3)	Oregon (10–4)	Notre Dame (11–4)	Miami (FL) (16–8)	Oregon (19–7)	Louisiana Tech (26–9)	Ole Miss (28–12)	Louisville (23–14)	Louisiana Tech (33–12)	Louisiana Tech (36–14)	UC Irvine (36–16)	East Carolina (41–15)	LSU (38–23)	Texas Tech (39–17)	15.
16.	Florida State	South Carolina (3–0)	East Carolina (6–1)	Oregon State (10–1)	Georgia Tech (9–5)	LSU (16–5)	South Carolina (16–6)	Notre Dame (12–5)	Florida (21–11)	Stanford (22–7)	Stanford (22–7)	Stanford (24–9)	Ole Miss (33–14)	Florida State (28–19)	South Carolina (33–20)	UC Irvine (40–16)	South Florida (31–28)	South Florida (31–30)	16.
17.	Arizona	Georgia Tech (2–1)	Virginia (4–3)	Arizona (10–2)	TCU (10–6)	Notre Dame (9–3)	Oklahoma State (15–6–1)	UCLA (16–9)	Arizona (21–9)	Arizona (23–11)	Charlotte (29–11)	Florida State (23–16)	Florida State (25–17)	UCLA (30–16)	Charlotte (39–17)	Louisiana Tech (40–18)	Old Dominion (44–16)	Old Dominion (44–16)	17.
18.	Georgia Tech	East Carolina (3–0)	Tennessee (7–2)	LSU (9–3)	Oregon State (11–3)	Oklahoma State (12–5–1)	Miami (FL) (12–8)	Georgia Tech (14–9)	Stanford (19–6)	Pittsburgh (20–11)	Louisiana Tech (28–11)	South Carolina (26–15)	Charlotte (35–14)	South Carolina (31–18)	Gonzaga (32–15)	UCLA (35–18)	Nebraska (34–14)	Oregon (39–16)	18.
19.	East Carolina	Florida State (2–1)	Texas (3–4)	Texas (7–5)	Arizona (12–4)т	Miami (FL) (9–7)	Arizona (16–7)	Arizona (18–8)	Pittsburgh (17–10)	Oklahoma State (21–10–1)	Oklahoma State (24–12–1)	Old Dominion (31–11)	UCLA (27–15)	Charlotte (37–16)	UCLA (32–18)	Oklahoma State (35–17–1)	UC Irvine (43–18)	UCLA (37–20)	19.
20.	Tennessee	Oklahoma State (2–0)	Georgia (7–1)	UC Santa Barbara (6–5)	Alabama (14–3)т	Pittsburgh (11–4)	Louisiana Tech (17–6)	Louisiana Tech (20–7)	Virginia Tech (19–9)	Old Dominion (27–7)	Pittsburgh (20–11)	Charlotte (31–14)	Southern Miss (33–15)	Gonzaga (30–13)	Old Dominion (38–14)	Nebraska (31–12)	Oregon (39–16)	Nebraska (34–14)	20.
21.	West Virginia	Texas (0–3)	Oregon State (7–1)	Boston College (8–2)	Oregon (8–3)	Michigan (9–2)	Oregon (12–6)	Oregon (16–6)	Oregon State (21–10)	Oregon State (24–10)	Georgia (26–13)	Pittsburgh (20–11)	South Carolina (28–17)	Southern Miss (35–17)	Louisiana Tech (36–16)	South Carolina (33–21)	Louisiana Tech (42–20)	UC Irvine (43–18)	21.
22.	Oklahoma	Auburn (3–0)	Arizona (6–2)	Alabama (10–2)т	UC Santa Barbara (9–5)	Alabama (15–5)	Florida State (12–8)	Florida State (15–9)	Old Dominion (24–6)т	Michigan (18–7)	Oregon State (26–12)	Oregon State (29–14)	Pittsburgh (22–13)	UC Irvine (33–15)	Southern Miss (35–17)	Southern Miss (37–19)	TCU (41–19)	Louisiana Tech (42–20)	22.
23.	South Carolina	Georgia (3–1)	Alabama (7–1)	Florida Atlantic (8–2)т	Georgia (13–3)	Florida State (10–6)	Michigan (11–4)	Michigan (13–5)	UC Santa Barbara (21–9)т	Miami (FL) (21–11)	Old Dominion (28–10)т	UCLA (25–14)	Oregon State (31–15)	Louisville (26–18)	Arizona State (32–17)	NC State (30–17)	Southern Miss (40–21)	Florida (38–22)	23.
24.	Georgia	Wake Forest (2–1)	North Carolina (6–1)	Virginia Tech (7–2)	Notre Dame (7–2)	South Carolina (12–6)	Stanford (14–3)	Stanford (16–5)	Michigan (15–7)	Charlotte (25–10)	UC Irvine (24–12)т	Gonzaga (27–13)	Gonzaga (27–13)	Old Dominion (36–14)	Florida State (29–21)	Charlotte (39–19)	UCLA (37–20)	TCU (41–19)	24.
25.	Auburn	Duke (2–1)	NC State (2–4)	Virginia (6–5)	Michigan (7–1)	Arizona (13–6)	LSU (16–8)	UC Santa Barbara (18–8)	Miami (FL) (17–11)	UCLA (21–11)	Florida State (20–15)	Southern Miss (29–14)	Old Dominion (33–13)	Arizona State (30–16)	NC State (28–15)	Florida State (30–22)	Florida (38–22)	Southern Miss (40–21)	25.
26.	Oklahoma State	Alabama (3–0)	Florida Atlantic (6–1)	Georgia (9–3)	Arizona State (11–2)	Louisiana Tech (13–5)	Pittsburgh (12–8)	Virginia Tech (15–9)	Georgia Tech (15–12)	UC Santa Barbara (24–10)	UCLA (23–13)	UC Santa Barbara (29–13)	UC Irvine (29–15)	Michigan (25–13)	Nebraska (29–11)	Gonzaga (33–17)	Oregon State (37–24)	Oregon State (37–24)	26.
27.	Duke	West Virginia (2–2)	Auburn (6–2)	Arizona State (8–2)	Pittsburgh (9–4)	North Carolina (12–6)	Arizona State (15–5)	Arizona State (16–7)	UCLA (17–11)	Indiana State (20–8)	Gonzaga (26–14)	Oklahoma State (25–14–1)	Indiana (23–10)	NC State (26–14)	Oklahoma State (32–16–1)	Duke (32–20)	Fairfield (39–5)	Oklahoma State (36–19–1)	27.
28.	UCF	Dallas Baptist (3–0)	Virginia Tech (5–1)	Dallas Baptist (8–3)	North Carolina (10–4)	Stanford (12–3)	UC Santa Barbara (15–7)	Pittsburgh (13–9)	Charlotte (22–9)	Georgia (23–12)	Michigan (19–9)	UC Irvine (26–14)	Arizona State (27–15)	Oklahoma State (30–15–1)	Fairfield (35–1)	Arizona State (32–20)	Oklahoma State (36–19–1)	Charlotte (40–21)	28.
29.	Arizona State	Arizona (2–2)	Boston College (5–1)	Oregon (6–2)	Stanford (10–2)	UC Santa Barbara (11–7)	North Carolina (13–7)	Old Dominion (21–5)	Indiana State (16–8)	Virginia Tech (20–12)	Nebraska (20–7)	Indiana (20–9)	Fairfield (32–1)т	Fairfield (32–1)	Miami (FL) (32–17)	Dallas Baptist (37–15)	Charlotte (40–21)	Gonzaga (34–19)	29.
30.	Alabamaт; Wake Forestт	Clemson (3–0)	Dallas Baptist (5–2)	Stanford (7–1)т West Virginia (4–3)т	Boston College (9–5)	Georgia (14–5)т West Virginia (4–3)т	Virginia Tech (13–8)	Dallas Baptist (18–7)	Georgia (20–11)	Georgia Tech (17–14)	UC Santa Barbara (26–12)	Georgia (27–16)	Baylor (29–14)т	Oregon State (20–6)т Baylor (29–16)т	Dallas Baptist (33–15)	Fairfield (37–3)	UC Santa Barbara (41–20)	South Carolina (34–23)	30.
	Preseason Feb 2	Week 1 Feb 23	Week 2 Mar 1	Week 3 Mar 8	Week 4 Mar 15	Week 5 Mar 22	Week 6 Mar 29	Week 7 Apr 5	Week 8 Apr 12	Week 9 Apr 19	Week 10 Apr 26	Week 11 May 3	Week 12 May 10	Week 13 May 17	Week 14 May 24	Week 15 May 31	Week 16 Jun 8	Final Jul 1	
		Dropped: No. 22 Oklahoma; No. 29 Arizona State	Dropped: No. 19 Florida State; No. 24 Georgia; No. 25 Duke; No. 27 West Virginia; No. 30 Clemson	Dropped: No. 24 North Carolina; No. 25 NC State; No. 27 Auburn	Dropped: No. 22 Florida Atlantic; No. 24 Virginia Tech; No. 28 Dallas Baptist; No. 30 West Virginia	Dropped: No. 26 Arizona State; No. 30 Boston College	Dropped: No. 22 Alabama; No. 30 Georgia; No. 30 West Virginia	Dropped: No. 25 LSU; No. 29 North Carolina	Dropped: No. 22 Florida State; No. 27 Arizona State; No. 30 Dallas Baptist	None	Dropped: No. 23 Miami (FL); No. 27 Indiana State; No. 29 Virginia Tech; No. 30 Georgia Tech	Dropped: No. 28 Michigan; No. 29 Nebraska	Dropped: No. 26 UC Santa Barbara; No. 27 Oklahoma State; No. 30 Georgia	Dropped: No. 22 Pittsburgh; No. 27 Indiana	Dropped: No. 23 Louisville; No. 26 Michigan; No. 30 Oregon; No. 30 Baylor	Dropped: No. 29 Miami (FL)	Dropped: No. 21 South Carolina; No. 25 Florida State; No. 26 Gonzaga; No. 27 Duke; No. 28 Arizona State	Dropped: No 27 Fairfield; No. 30 UC Santa Barbara	

The Preseason poll ranked the top 35 teams in the nation. Teams not listed above are: 32. Clemson 33. Texas A&M 34. Michigan 35. Dallas Baptist

== D1Baseball ==
	Preseason Jan 18	Week 1 Feb 23	Week 2 Mar 1	Week 3 Mar 8	Week 4 Mar 15	Week 5 Mar 22	Week 6 Mar 29	Week 7 Apr 5	Week 8 Apr 12	Week 9 Apr 19	Week 10 Apr 26	Week 11 May 3	Week 12 May 10	Week 13 May 17	Week 14 May 24	Week 15 Jun 1	Final Jul 1	
1.	Florida	Ole Miss (3–0)	Arkansas (7–0)	Arkansas (10–0)	Arkansas (12–1)	Vanderbilt (15–3)	Vanderbilt (19–3)	Vanderbilt (23–3)	Arkansas (26–5)	Arkansas (30–6)	Arkansas (32–7)	Arkansas (34–8)	Arkansas (36–9)	Arkansas (39–10)	Arkansas (42–10)	Arkansas (46–10)	Mississippi State (50–18)	1.
2.	UCLA	Arkansas (3–0)	Vanderbilt (6–1)	Vanderbilt (9–1)	Vanderbilt (12–2)	Arkansas (14–3)	Arkansas (19–3)	Arkansas (22–4)	Vanderbilt (25–5)	Vanderbilt (28–6)	Vanderbilt (31–7)	Vanderbilt (32–9)	Vanderbilt (34–10)	Texas (38–12)	Texas (40–13)	Tennessee (45–16)	Vanderbilt (49–18)	2.
3.	Texas Tech	Vanderbilt (2–0)	Mississippi State (5–2)	Mississippi State (8–3)	Mississippi State (13–3)	Mississippi State (16–4)	Ole Miss (20–4)	Ole Miss (21–6)	Texas (25–8)	Texas (30–8)	Texas (33–9)	TCU (33–10)	Mississippi State (35–11)	Vanderbilt (36–12)	Vanderbilt (39–13)	Texas (42–15)	Texas (50–17)	3.
4.	Vanderbilt	Louisville (3–0)	Ole Miss (5–2)	Ole Miss (10–2)	Ole Miss (13–3)	Ole Miss (16–4)	Texas Tech (19–4)	Texas (20–8)	Mississippi State (24–7)	Mississippi State (27–8)	Tennessee (32–9)	Mississippi State (32–10)	Tennessee (37–11)	Tennessee (39–13)	Tennessee (42–14)	Vanderbilt (40–15)	NC State (37–19)	4.
5.	Louisville	Mississippi State (2–1)	Louisville (6–1)	Florida (9–3)	Florida (13–4)	Florida (16–5)	Texas (17–7)	Mississippi State (20–7)	Tennessee (27–6)	Texas Tech (26–8)	TCU (29–10)	Tennessee (34–11)	Texas (38–12)	Texas Tech (33–12)	Texas Tech (35–13)	Arizona (40–15)	Arkansas (50–13)	5.
6.	Ole Miss	Miami (FL) (2–1)	Florida (6–2)	UCLA (8–3)	Miami (FL) (8–4)	Texas Tech (16–4)	Georgia Tech (13–7)	Tennessee (24–5)	Ole Miss (24–8)	Tennessee (29–8)	Mississippi State (29–10)	Texas (35–11)	TCU (34–12)	Oregon (33–11)	Arizona (38–14)	Notre Dame (30–11)	Tennessee (50–18)	6.
7.	Mississippi State	Florida (1–2)	UC Santa Barbara (6–1)	Georgia Tech (8–3)	Texas Tech (13–3)	Louisville (14–5)	Louisville (16–6)	Louisville (18–8)	Louisville (20–10)	Louisville (22–11)	Louisville (23–11)	Notre Dame (24–8)	Texas Tech (31–11)	Arizona (35–13)	Notre Dame (29–10)	Stanford (33–14)	Arizona (45–18)	7.
8.	Arkansas	UCLA (1–2)	UCLA (4–3)	Miami (FL) (5–4)	Louisville (11–4)	East Carolina (16–3)	Mississippi State (17–7)	Texas Tech (20–6)	Texas Tech (22–7)	TCU (26–9)	Notre Dame (20–8)	Texas Tech (30–11)	Notre Dame (25–10)	Notre Dame (26–10)	Mississippi State (40–13)	TCU (40–17)	Stanford (37–19)	8.
9.	Texas	UC Santa Barbara (2–1)	Miami (FL) (3–3)	Texas Tech (8–3)	East Carolina (13–2)	Texas (14–6)	Tennessee (21–4)	East Carolina (22–5)	East Carolina (26–5)	East Carolina (26–5)	Oregon (24–9)	Arizona (30–11)	Florida (33–14)	Florida (35–16)	Stanford (31–13)	Texas Tech (36–15)	Virginia (36–27)	9.
10.	TCU	Texas Tech (0–3)	Texas Tech (3–3)	Louisville (7–4)	Texas (11–5)	UCLA (12–6)	UCLA (15–7)	TCU (20–7)	Notre Dame (15–6)	Notre Dame (18–7)	East Carolina (28–7)	Florida (30–13)	Oregon (30–11)	Mississippi State (36–13)	Oregon (35–13)	Oregon (37–14)	Notre Dame (34–13)	10.
11.	UC Santa Barbara	LSU (2–1)	LSU (6–1)	TCU (8–3)	UCLA (10–5)	Georgia Tech (11–6)	East Carolina (17–5)	South Carolina (19–7)	South Carolina (21–9)	South Carolina (24–10)	Texas Tech (27–10)	Oregon (27–11)	East Carolina (33–10)	East Carolina (36–11)	East Carolina (38–13)	Mississippi State (40–15)	Texas Tech (39–17)	11.
12.	LSU	Virginia (2–1)	Georgia Tech (6–1)	South Carolina (10–0)	Georgia Tech (9–5)	Tennessee (17–4)	TCU (16–7)	Florida (18–9)	TCU (22–9)	Ole Miss (26–10)	Arizona (27–11)	Ole Miss (31–12)	Stanford (26–10)	TCU (35–14)	Ole Miss (38–17)	East Carolina (41–15)	East Carolina (44–17)	12.
13.	NC State	NC State (2–0)	TCU (5–2)	Oklahoma State (9–0–1)	Tennessee (14–3)	TCU (13–7)	Notre Dame (11–4)	Notre Dame (12–5)	Oklahoma State (21–7–1)	Oregon (22–8)	South Carolina (25–12)	East Carolina (30–9)	Arizona (32–13)	Ole Miss (36–15)	Florida (35–19)	Ole Miss (41–19)	Ole Miss (45–22)	13.
14.	West Virginia	TCU (1–2)	South Carolina (6–0)	East Carolina (9–2)	Oklahoma State (11–2–1)	Notre Dame (9–3)	South Carolina (16–6)	Oklahoma State (18–7–1)	Louisiana Tech (24–7)	Louisiana Tech (26–9)	Florida (28–12)	Louisiana Tech (32–11)	Louisiana Tech (33–12)	Louisiana Tech (36–14)	Gonzaga (32–15)	Florida (38–20)	Dallas Baptist (41–18)	14.
15.	Georgia Tech	Georgia Tech (2–1)	Oklahoma State (6–0)	Tennessee (11–2)	TCU (10–6)	Pittsburgh (11–4)	Florida (16–8)	Georgia Tech (14–9)	Oregon (19–7)	Florida (25–11)	Charlotte (29–11)	Louisville (23–14)	Louisville (26–15)	Stanford (28–12)	TCU (36–16)	Old Dominion (42–14)	TCU (41–19)	15.
16.	Virginia	Wake Forest (2–1)	Virginia (4–3)	Oregon State (10–1)	South Carolina (11–3)	Oregon (10–4)	Oklahoma State (15–6–1)	Louisiana Tech (20–7)	Arizona (21–9)	Pittsburgh (20–11)	Louisiana Tech (28–11)	Stanford (24–9)	Pittsburgh (22–13)	Florida State (28–19)	NC State (28–15)	NC State (30–17)	Old Dominion (44–16)	16.
17.	Wake Forest	South Carolina (3–0)	East Carolina (6–1)	Boston College (8–2)	Notre Dame (7–2)	Florida State (10–6)	Louisiana Tech (17–6)	Florida State (15–9)	Virginia Tech (19–9)	Stanford (22–7)	Pittsburgh (20–11)	Pittsburgh (20–11)	Florida State (25–17)	Gonzaga (30–13)	UC Irvine (36–16)	UC Irvine (40–16)	Nebraska (34–14)	17.
18.	South Carolina	Tennessee (3–0)	Tennessee (7–2)	Virginia Tech (7–2)	Pittsburgh (9–4)	Michigan (9–2)	Florida State (12–8)	Miami (FL) (16–8)	Florida (21–11)	Arizona (23–11)	Stanford (22–7)	Florida State (23–16)	Ole Miss (33–14)	UCLA (30–16)	Louisiana Tech (36–16)	Louisiana Tech (40–18)	LSU (38–25)	18.
19.	Tennessee	Texas (0–3)	Texas (3–4)	Texas (7–5)	LSU (14–3)	Miami (FL) (9–7)	Miami (FL) (12–8)	Oregon (16–6)	Pittsburgh (17–10)	Charlotte (25–10)	Ole Miss (28–12)	South Carolina (26–15)	Southern Miss (33–15)	Southern Miss (35–17)	Southern Miss (35–17)	Nebraska (31–12)	Oregon (39–16)	19.
20.	Oklahoma State	Oklahoma State (2–0)	Oregon State (7–1)	Florida Atlantic (8–2)	Oregon (8–3)	Oklahoma State (12–5–1)	Oregon (12–6)	Oregon State (20–6)	Stanford (19–6)	Old Dominion (27–7)	Florida State (20–15)	Southern Miss (29–14)	Charlotte (35–14)	UC Irvine (33–15)	Nebraska (29–11)	Southern Miss (37–19)	South Florida (31–30)	20.
21.	Miami (FL)	Auburn (3–0)	Florida Atlantic (6–1)	LSU (9–3)	UC Santa Barbara (9–5)	Oregon State (13–4)	Oregon State (16–5)	UCLA (16–9)	Charlotte (22–9)	Indiana State (20–8)	Gonzaga (26–13)	Gonzaga (27–13)	Indiana (23–10)	South Carolina (31–18)	Arizona State (32–17)	UCLA (35–18)	UC Irvine (43–18)	21.
22.	Arizona	East Carolina (3–0)	Boston College (5–1)	UC Santa Barbara (6–5)	Michigan (7–1)	LSU (16–5)	Arizona (16–7)	Arizona (18–8)	Old Dominion (24–6)	Virginia Tech (20–12)	Nebraska (20–7)	Old Dominion (31–11)	Gonzaga (27–13)	Charlotte (37–16)	Charlotte (39–17)	Duke (32–20)	Louisiana Tech (42–20)	22.
23.	Auburn	West Virginia (2–2)	West Virginia (4–3)	West Virginia (4–3)	Oregon State (11–3)	Louisiana Tech (13–5)	Virginia Tech (13–8)	Virginia Tech (15–9)	Indiana State (16–8)	Michigan (18–7)	Southern Miss (26–13)	Charlotte (31–14)	UCLA (27–15)	NC State (26–14)	Florida State (29–21)	Oklahoma State (35–17–1)	Southern Miss (40–21)	23.
24.	Florida State	Florida State (2–1)	Virginia Tech (5–1)	Arizona (10–2)	Boston College (9–5)	North Carolina (12–6)	Pittsburgh (12–8)	Pittsburgh (13–9)	Florida State (16–12)	Oklahoma State (21–10–1)	UC Irvine (24–12)	Indiana (20–9)	UC Irvine (29–15)	Michigan (25–13)	Old Dominion (38–14)	Maryland (28–16)	UCLA (37–20)	24.
25.	East Carolina	Duke (2–1)	North Carolina (6–1)	Notre Dame (4–2)	Virginia Tech (9–5)	South Carolina (12–6)	Michigan (11–4)	Michigan (13–5)	Michigan (15–7)	Florida State (18–14)	Old Dominion (28–10)	UCLA (25–14)	South Carolina (28–17)	Arizona State (30–16)	Maryland (26–15)	Gonzaga (33–17)	Maryland (30–18)	25.
	Preseason Jan 18	Week 1 Feb 23	Week 2 Mar 1	Week 3 Mar 8	Week 4 Mar 15	Week 5 Mar 22	Week 6 Mar 29	Week 7 Apr 5	Week 8 Apr 12	Week 9 Apr 19	Week 10 Apr 26	Week 11 May 3	Week 12 May 10	Week 13 May 17	Week 14 May 24	Week 15 Jun 1	Final Jul 1	
		Dropped: No. 22 Arizona	Dropped: No. 13 NC State; No. 16 Wake Forest; No. 21 Auburn; No. 24 Florida State; No. 25 Duke	Dropped: No. 16 Virginia; No. 25 North Carolina	Dropped: No. 20 Florida Atlantic; No. 23 West Virginia; No. 24 Arizona	Dropped: No. 21 UC Santa Barbara; No. 24 Boston College; No. 25 Virginia Tech	Dropped: No. 22 LSU; No. 24 North Carolina	None	Dropped: No. 15 Georgia Tech; No. 18 Miami (FL); No. 20 Oregon State; No. 21 UCLA	None	Dropped: No. 21 Indiana State; No. 22 Virginia Tech; No. 23 Michigan; No. 24 Oklahoma State	Dropped: No. 22 Nebraska; No. 24 UC Irvine	Dropped: No. 22 Old Dominion	Dropped: No. 15 Louisville; No. 16 Pittsburgh; No. 21 Indiana	Dropped: No. 18 UCLA; No. 21 South Carolina; No. 24 Michigan	Dropped: No. 21 Arizona State; No. 22 Charlotte; No. 23 Florida State	Dropped: No. 14 Florida; No. 22 Duke; No. 23 Oklahoma State; No. 25 Gonzaga	
