= 2021 Hawaii Rainbow Warriors baseball team =

American college baseball season

2021 Hawaii Rainbow Warriors baseball
- Conference: Big West Conference
- Record: 24–26 (16–24 Big West)
- Head coach: Mike Trapasso (20th season)
- Assistant coaches: Mike Brown; Carl Fraticelli; Kila Kaʻaihue
- Home stadium: Les Murakami Stadium

2021 Big West Conference baseball standings
	Conf.				Overall
Team	W		L	PCT	W		L	PCT
No. 17 UC Irvine ‍†‍‍^{y}	32	–	8	.800	43	–	18	.705
UC Santa Barbara ‍‍‍^{y}	29	–	11	.725	41	–	20	.672
Long Beach State ‍‍‍	26	–	14	.650	28	–	15	.651
Cal Poly ‍‍‍	21	–	19	.525	31	–	25	.554
Cal State Northridge ‍‍‍	21	–	19	.525	21	–	19	.525
UC San Diego ‍‍‍	21	–	19	.525	24	–	28	.462
Cal State Bakersfield ‍‍‍	17	–	19	.472	20	–	23	.465
Hawaii ‍‍‍	16	–	24	.400	24	–	26	.480
Cal State Fullerton ‍‍‍	13	–	23	.361	20	–	35	.364
UC Riverside ‍‍‍	12	–	28	.300	15	–	36	.294
UC Davis ‍‍‍	8	–	32	.200	14	–	43	.246
† – Conference champion y – Invited to the NCAA tournament As of June 7, 2021; Rankings from D1Baseball

The 2021 Hawaii Rainbow Warriors baseball team represented the University of Hawaiʻi at Mānoa during the 2021 NCAA Division I baseball season. Hawaii is competing in the Big West Conference. The Rainbow Warriors played their home games at Les Murakami Stadium. Coach Mike Trapasso lead the Rainbow Warriors in his 20th season with the program.

After a strong start, seeing the Warriors nationally ranked, the program finished the season with a 24–26 record.

== Previous season ==
The 2020 Hawaii Rainbow Warriors baseball team notched an 11–6 (0–0) regular-season record. The season prematurely ended on March 12, 2020, due to concerns over the COVID-19 pandemic.

== Preseason ==
=== Coaches Poll ===
The Big West baseball coaches' poll was released on February 10, 2021. Hawaii was picked to finished 7th in the Big West.

Coaches' Poll
Predicted finish	Team	Points
1	UCSB	119 (10)
2	Long Beach State	96
3	UC Irvine	95
4	Cal Poly	94
5	Cal State Fullerton	78
6	CSUN	64 (1)
7	Hawaii	61
8	UC Davis	39
9	UC San Diego	33
10	UC Riverside	29
11	CSU Bakersfield	18

== Personnel ==
=== Roster ===
2021 Hawaii Rainbow Warriors baseball team
Players
Coaches

#	Pos.	Name	B/T	Height	Weight	Year	Home town
1	OF	Scotty Scott	L/R	5 ft 10 in (1.78 m)	165 lb (75 kg)	So	Cypress, TX
2	INF	Kole Kaler	S/R	5 ft 10 in (1.78 m)	170 lb (77 kg)	Jr	Queen Creek, AZ
3		Tyler Best	R/R	6 ft 1 in (1.85 m)	180 lb (82 kg)	So	Eagle, ID
4	OF	Matt Wong	R/R	6 ft 2 in (1.88 m)	200 lb (91 kg)	Jr	Mililani, HI
5	INF	Aaron Ujimori	S/R	5 ft 9 in (1.75 m)	170 lb (77 kg)	Fr	Honolulu, HI
6	INF	Stone Miyao	L/R	5 ft 10 in (1.78 m)	170 lb (77 kg)	Fr	Hilo, HI
7	INF	Matt Campos	R/R	5 ft 11 in (1.8 m)	175 lb (79 kg)	RS Jr	Waipahu, HI
8	C	Dallas Duarte	R/R	5 ft 9 in (1.75 m)	170 lb (77 kg)	So	Hilo, HI
9	INF	Kenji Suzuki	R/R	6 ft 0 in (1.83 m)	190 lb (86 kg)	Fr	Seattle, WA
10	INF	Alex Baeza	L/L	6 ft 4 in (1.93 m)	225 lb (102 kg)	RS Jr	West Jordan, UT
12	LHP	Tai Atkins	L/L	5 ft 10 in (1.78 m)	170 lb (77 kg)	Fr	Kohala, HI
13	RHP	Li'i Pontes	R/R	6 ft 0 in (1.83 m)	185 lb (84 kg)	So	Mililani, HI
15	RHP	Cameron Hagan	R/R	6 ft 5 in (1.96 m)	210 lb (95 kg)	So	Salem, OR
17	C	Tyler Murray	R/R	6 ft 0 in (1.83 m)	215 lb (98 kg)	RS Sr	Huntington Beach, CA
18	OF	Adam Fogel	R/R	6 ft 5 in (1.96 m)	215 lb (98 kg)	RS Jr	Palos Verdes Estates, CA
19	INF	Safea Mauai	L/L	6 ft 1 in (1.85 m)	240 lb (109 kg)	Fr	Hilo, HI
20	INF	Dustin Demeter	L/R	6 ft 2 in (1.88 m)	200 lb (91 kg)	RS Jr	Goleta, CA
21	C	Jared Quandt	S/R	6 ft 0 in (1.83 m)	175 lb (79 kg)	Fr	Los Gatos, CA
22	INF	Bubba Akana	L/L	6 ft 2 in (1.88 m)	195 lb (88 kg)	Fr	Honolulu, HI
23	LHP	Austin Teixeira	L/L	6 ft 0 in (1.83 m)	180 lb (82 kg)	Fr	Waimānalo, HI
24	RHP	Aaron Davenport	R/R	6 ft 0 in (1.83 m)	185 lb (84 kg)	So	Duvall, WA
26		Jacob Igawa	R/R	5 ft 11 in (1.8 m)	200 lb (91 kg)	So	Hilo, HI
27	LHP	Brandon Ross	L/L	6 ft 0 in (1.83 m)	190 lb (86 kg)	Jr	Murrieta, CA
28	RHP	Jake Hymel	R/R	6 ft 3 in (1.91 m)	200 lb (91 kg)	Fr	Cypress, TX
29	RHP	Trevor Ichimura	R/R	6 ft 0 in (1.83 m)	205 lb (93 kg)	RS Fr	Mililani, HI
30	OF	Naighel Calderon	R/R	5 ft 9 in (1.75 m)	170 lb (77 kg)	Fr	Lanai City, HI
31	C	Blake Hiraki	R/R	5 ft 11 in (1.8 m)	190 lb (86 kg)	Fr	Mililani, HI
32		Nainoa Cardinez	R/R	6 ft 2 in (1.88 m)	200 lb (91 kg)	Fr	Kapaa, HI
33	C	Konnor Palmeira	R/R	6 ft 0 in (1.83 m)	195 lb (88 kg)	Fr	Kahului, HI
36	RHP	Tyler Dyball	R/R	6 ft 2 in (1.88 m)	180 lb (82 kg)	RS Fr	Honolulu, HI
37	LHP	Connor Harrison	L/L	6 ft 0 in (1.83 m)	185 lb (84 kg)	Fr	Granite Bay, CA
38	RHP	Dalton Renne	R/R	6 ft 7 in (2.01 m)	200 lb (91 kg)	So	Banks, OR
39	RHP	Ashton Goddard	R/R	6 ft 4 in (1.93 m)	190 lb (86 kg)	RS So	Laguna Beach, CA
40	RHP	Cade Halemanu	R/R	6 ft 4 in (1.93 m)	215 lb (98 kg)	So	Pearl City, HI
42	RHP	Buddie Pindel	R/R	6 ft 2 in (1.88 m)	200 lb (91 kg)	Jr	Las Vegas, NV
44		Logan Pouelsen	L/R	6 ft 2 in (1.88 m)	250 lb (113 kg)	Sr	Huntington Beach, CA
45	RHP	Calvin Turchin	R/R	6 ft 4 in (1.93 m)	225 lb (102 kg)	Jr	Maple Valley, WA

Head coach

Mike Trapasso

Assistant coach(es)

Mike Brown
Carl Fraticelli
Kila Kaʻaihue

Legend

- (C) Team captain
- (S) Suspended
- (I) Ineligible
- Injured
- Current redshirt

Roster
Last update: March 24, 2021

=== Coaching staff ===
2021 Hawaii Rainbow Warriors baseball coaching staff
Name	Position	Seasons at Hawaii	Alma mater
Mike Trapasso	Head coach	20	Oklahoma State University (1985)
Mike Brown	Assistant Coach	3	University of Kentucky (2007)
Carl Fraticelli	Assistant Coach	10	Loyola Marymount University (1988)
Kila Kaʻaihue	Assistant Coach	1	University of Hawaiʻi at Mānoa (2020)

== Game log ==
2021 Hawai'i Rainbow Warriors baseball game log
Legend: = Win = Loss = Canceled Bold = Hawaii team member
Regular season (24–26)

February (1–2)
Date	Time (HT)	TV	Opponent	Rank	Stadium	Score	Win	Loss	Save	Attendance	Overall	BWC	Sources
February 26	3:35 p.m.	ASUL-3	at No. 15 Arizona State*		Phoenix Municipal Stadium; Phoenix, Arizona	**W** 3–2	**Teixeira (1–0)**	Osman (0–1)	—	0	1–0	—	Box Score; Recap
February 27	11:05 a.m.	ASUL-1	at No. 15 Arizona State*		Phoenix Municipal Stadium	**L** 5–6	Fall (1–0)	**Hymel (0–1)**	Long (2)	0	1–1	—	Box Score; Recap
February 27	3:05 p.m.	ASUL-1	at No. 15 Arizona State*		Phoenix Municipal Stadium	**L** 6–9	Glenn (1–0)	**Pindel (0–1)**	Corrigan (1)	0	1–2	—	Box Score; Recap

March (10–5)
Date	Time (HT)	TV	Opponent	Rank	Stadium	Score	Win	Loss	Save	Attendance	Overall	BWC	Sources
March 4	6:35 p.m.	SPECTSN	Hawaii Pacific*		Les Murakami Stadium; Honolulu, Hawaii	**W** 12–1	**Davenport (1–0)**	Adams (0–1)	—	0	2–2	—	Box Score; Recap
March 5	6:35 p.m.	SPECTSN	Hawaii Pacific*		Les Murakami Stadium	**W** 14–3	**Pindel (1–1)**	Cortez (0–1)	—	0	3–2	—	Box Score; Recap
March 6	1:05 p.m.	SPECTSN	Hawaii Pacific*		Les Murakami Stadium	**W** 10–2	**Teixeira (2–0)**	Mayeshiro (0–1)	—	0	4–2	—	Box Score; Recap
March 7	1:05 p.m.	SPECTSN	Hawaii Pacific*		Les Murakami Stadium	**W** 10–0	**Pontes (1–0)**	Pringle (0–1)	—	0	5–2	—	Box Score; Recap
March 12	6:35 p.m.	SPECTSN	Hawaii–Hilo*		Les Murakami Stadium	Cancelled (inclement weather)					5–2	—	Recap
March 13	1:05 p.m.	SPECTSN	Hawaii–Hilo*		Les Murakami Stadium	**W** 3–2	**Dyball (1–0)**	de Jesús (0–1)	—	0	6–2	—	Box Score; Recap
March 13	4:05 p.m.	SPECTSN	Hawaii–Hilo*		Les Murakami Stadium	**W** 6–2	**Halemanu (1–0)**	Scudder (0–1)	**Pindel (1)**	0	7–2	—	Box Score; Recap
March 14	4:05 p.m.	SPECTSN	Hawaii–Hilo*		Les Murakami Stadium	**W** 13–0	**Pouelsen (1–0)**	Alcorn (0–1)	—	0	8–2	—	Box Score; Recap
March 19	6:35 p.m.	SPECTSN	Long Beach State		Les Murakami Stadium	**W** 3–2	**Dyball (2–0)**	D. Harrison (0–1)	—	0	9–2	1–0	Box Score; Recap
March 20	1:05 p.m.	SPECTSN	Long Beach State		Les Murakami Stadium	**W** 1–0	**Halemanu (2–0)**	Ramírez (0–1)	**Turchin (1)**	0	10–2	2–0	Box Score; Recap
March 20	4:05 p.m.	SPECTSN	Long Beach State		Les Murakami Stadium	**W** 6–4	**Pindel (2–1)**	Noble (0–1)	**Pontes (1)**	0	11–2	3–0	Box Score; Recap
March 21	1:05 p.m.	SPECTSN	Long Beach State		Les Murakami Stadium	**L** 5–8	Noble (1–1)	**C. Harrison (0–1)**	D. Harrison (1)	0	11–3	3–1	Box Score; Recap
March 26	12:00 p.m.	Big West TV	at UC Irvine		Cicerone Field; Irvine, California	**L** 0–4	Denholm (2–1)	**Davenport (1–1)**	King (1)	0	11-4	3-2	Box Score; Recap
March 27	9:00 a.m.	Big West TV	at UC Irvine		Cicerone Field	**L** 5–12	Pinto (2–1)	**Pindel (2–2)**	—	0	11–5	3–3	Box Score; Recap
March 27	1:00 p.m.	Big West TV	at UC Irvine		Cicerone Field	**L** 3–4	King (2–1)	**Pontes (1–1)**	—	0	11–6	3–4	Box Score; Recap
March 28	1:05 p.m.		at UC Irvine		Cicerone Field	**L** 10–20 ^{(7)}	Brooks (1–0)	**Ichimura (0–1)**	—	0	11–7	3–5	Box Score; Recap

April (9–8)
Date	Time (HT)	TV	Opponent	Rank	Stadium	Score	Win	Loss	Save	Attendance	Overall	BWC	Sources
April 2	3:00 p.m.		No. 28 UCSB		Les Murakami Stadium	**L** 0–3	McGreevy (4–0)	**Davenport (1–2)**	—	0	11–8	3–6	Box Score; Recap
April 3	12:00 p.m.		No. 28 UCSB		Les Murakami Stadium	**L** 4–5	Boone (5–1)	**Halemanu (2–1)**	Benbrook (1)	0	11–9	3–7	Box Score; Recap
April 3	4:00 p.m.		No. 28 UCSB		Les Murakami Stadium	**W** 6–5	**Pouelsen (2–0)**	Roberts (0–2)	**Atkins (1)**	0	12–9	4–7	Box Score; Recap
April 4	1:05 p.m.	SPECTSN	No. 28 UCSB		Les Murakami Stadium	**L** 1–9	Callahan (2–1)	**Hymel (0–2)**	Dand (2)	0	12–10	4–8	Box Score; Recap
April 9	3:00 p.m.	Big West TV	at UC Riverside		Riverside Sports Complex; Riverside, California	**W** 7–5	**Davenport (2–2)**	Haffar (0–2)	**Dyball (1)**	0	13–10	5–8	Box Score; Recap
April 10	9:00 a.m.	Big West TV	at UC Riverside		Riverside Sports Complex	**W** 7–0	**Teixeira (3–0)**	Tucker (1–1)	**Halemanu (1)**	0	14–10	6–8	Box Score; Recap
April 10	12:00 p.m.	Big West TV	at UC Riverside		Riverside Sports Complex	**W** 13–4	**Hymel (1–2)**	Frazier (0–1)	—	0	15–10	7–8	Box Score; Recap
April 11	9:00 a.m.	Big West TV	at UC Riverside		Riverside Sports Complex	**L** 2–9	Anderson (1–0)	**Pontes (1–2)**	Marrujo (1)	0	15–11	7–9	Box Score; Recap
April 16	3:00 p.m.		Cal State Bakersfield		Les Murakami Stadium	**L** 2–5					15–12	7–10	
April 17	12:00 p.m.		Cal State Bakersfield		Les Murakami Stadium	**L** 1–4					15–13	7–11	
April 17	4:00 p.m.		Cal State Bakersfield		Les Murakami Stadium	**W** 11–4					16–13	8–11	
April 18	1:05 p.m.	SPECTSN	Cal State Bakersfield		Les Murakami Stadium	**L** 4–7					16–14	8–12	
April 23	3:00 p.m.		UC Davis		Les Murakami Stadium	**W** 6–2					17–14	9–12	
April 24	12:00 p.m.		UC Davis		Les Murakami Stadium	**W** 8–3					18–14	10–12	
April 24	4:00 p.m.		UC Davis		Les Murakami Stadium	**W** 7–2					19–14	11–12	
April 25	1:05 p.m.	SPECTSN	UC Davis		Les Murakami Stadium	**W** 9–2					20–14	12–12	
April 30	2:00 p.m.		at Cal State Fullerton		Goodwin Field; Fullerton, California	**L** 4–5 ^{11}					20–15	12–13	

May (4–11)
Date	Time (HT)	TV	Opponent	Rank	Stadium	Score	Win	Loss	Save	Attendance	Overall	BWC	Sources
May 1	9:00 a.m.		at Cal State Fullerton		Goodwin Field	**W** 4–1					21–15	13–13	
May 1	1:00 p.m.		at Cal State Fullerton		Goodwin Field	**W** 16–8					22–15	14–13	
May 2	10:05 a.m.		at Cal State Fullerton		Goodwin Field	**W** 8–2					23–15	15–13	
May 14	3:00 p.m.		at CSUN		Matador Field; Northridge, California	**L** 1–9					23–16	15–14	
May 15	8:00 a.m.		at CSUN		Matador Field	**L** 0–12					23–17	15–15	
May 15	11:35 a.m.		at CSUN		Matador Field	**L** 3–4					23–18	15–16	
May 16	1:00 p.m.		at CSUN		Matador Field	**L** 2–6					23–19	15–17	
May 21	6:35 p.m.	SPECTSN	UC San Diego		Les Murakami Stadium	**L** 2–6					23–20	15–18	
May 22	1:05 p.m.	SPECTSN	UC San Diego		Les Murakami Stadium	**L** 2–4					23–21	15–19	
May 22	4:35 p.m.	SPECTSN	UC San Diego		Les Murakami Stadium	**W** 5–2					24–21	16–19	
May 23	1:05 p.m.	SPECTSN	UC San Diego		Les Murakami Stadium	**L** 2–3					24–22	16–20	
May 28	6:35 p.m.		at Cal Poly		Robin Baggett Stadium; San Luis Obispo, California	**L** 3–13					24–23	16–21	
May 29	1:05 p.m.		at Cal Poly		Robin Baggett Stadium	**L** 4–5					24–24	16–22	
May 29	4:35 p.m.		at Cal Poly		Robin Baggett Stadium	**L** 4–14 ^{7}					24–25	16–23	
May 30	1:05 p.m.		at Cal Poly		Robin Baggett Stadium	**L** 2–6					24–26	16–24	

*Denotes non–conference game • Schedule source • Rankings based on the teams' current ranking in the D1Baseball poll

== Rankings ==
Ranking movements Legend: ██ Increase in ranking ██ Decrease in ranking — = Not ranked RV = Received votes
	Week																		
Poll	Pre	1	2	3	4	5	6	7	8	9	10	11	12	13	14	15	16	17	Final
Coaches'	—	—*	—	—	—	—	—	—	—	—	—	—	—	—	—	—	—	—	—
Baseball America	—	—	—	—	—	—	—	—	—	—	—	—	—	—	—	—	—	—	—
Collegiate Baseball^	RV	—	—	—	—	30	—	—	—	—	—	—	—	—	—	—	—	—	—
NCBWA†	—	—	—	—	—	RV	—	—	—	—	—	—	—	—	—	—	—	—	—
D1Baseball	—	—	—	—	—	—	—	—	—	—	—	—	—	—	—	—	—	—	—

^ Collegiate Baseball ranked 40 teams in their preseason poll, but only ranked 30 teams weekly during the season.
† NCBWA ranks 30 teams in their preseason poll, but only ranks 25 teams weekly during the season.
* A new poll was not released for this week, so for comparison purposes, the previous week's ranking is inserted in this week's slot.

== 2021 MLB draft ==
Player	Position	Round	Overall	MLB team
Aaron Davenport	RHP	6	186	Cleveland Indians
