= 2021 UC Santa Barbara Gauchos baseball team =

Baseball team season

2021 UC Santa Barbara Gauchos baseball

NCAA tournament, Tucson Regional
- Conference: Big West Conference
- Record: 41–20 (29–11 Big West)
- Head coach: Andrew Checketts (10th season)
- Home stadium: Caesar Uyesaka Stadium

2021 Big West Conference baseball standings
	Conf.				Overall
Team	W		L	PCT	W		L	PCT
No. 17 UC Irvine ‍†‍‍^{y}	32	–	8	.800	43	–	18	.705
UC Santa Barbara ‍‍‍^{y}	29	–	11	.725	41	–	20	.672
Long Beach State ‍‍‍	26	–	14	.650	28	–	15	.651
Cal Poly ‍‍‍	21	–	19	.525	31	–	25	.554
Cal State Northridge ‍‍‍	21	–	19	.525	21	–	19	.525
UC San Diego ‍‍‍	21	–	19	.525	24	–	28	.462
Cal State Bakersfield ‍‍‍	17	–	19	.472	20	–	23	.465
Hawaii ‍‍‍	16	–	24	.400	24	–	26	.480
Cal State Fullerton ‍‍‍	13	–	23	.361	20	–	35	.364
UC Riverside ‍‍‍	12	–	28	.300	15	–	36	.294
UC Davis ‍‍‍	8	–	32	.200	14	–	43	.246
† – Conference champion y – Invited to the NCAA tournament As of June 7, 2021; Rankings from D1Baseball

The 2021 UC Santa Barbara Gauchos baseball team represented University of California, Santa Barbara during the 2021 NCAA Division I baseball season. The Gauchos play their home games at Caesar Uyesaka Stadium as a member of the Big West Conference. They are led by head coach Andrew Checketts, in his tenth year as head coach.

== Previous season ==
The 2020 UC Santa Barbara Gauchos baseball team notched a 13–2 (0–0) regular-season record. The season prematurely ended on March 12, 2020, due to concerns over the COVID-19 pandemic.

== Schedule and results ==
=== Tucson Regional ===
Tucson Regional Teams
(1) Arizona Wildcats	(2) Oklahoma State Cowboys	(3) UCSB Gauchos	(4) Grand Canyon Antelopes

First Round
1	Arizona	12
4	Grand Canyon	6
3	UCSB	14
2	Oklahoma State	4
Lower round 1
4	Grand Canyon	3
2	Oklahoma State	5

Semi-Finals
1	Arizona	4
3	UCSB	0
Lower final
3	UCSB	13
2	Oklahoma State	3

Finals
1	Arizona
3	UCSB

== 2021 MLB draft ==
Player	Position	Round	Overall	MLB team
Michael McGreevy	RHP	1	18	St. Louis Cardinals
Chris Troye	RHP	12	346	Boston Red Sox
Marcos Castanon	SS	12	370	San Diego Padres
