= 2021 Arizona State Sun Devils baseball team =

American college baseball season

2021 Arizona State Sun Devils baseball
- Conference: Pac-12 Conference
- Record: 33–22 (16–14 Pac-12)
- Head coach: Tracy Smith (7th season)
- Assistant coaches: Ben Greenspan (7th season); Jason Kelly (2nd season); Michael Earley (5th season)
- Home stadium: Phoenix Municipal Stadium

2021 Pac-12 Conference baseball standings
	Conf.				Overall
Team	W		L	PCT	W		L	PCT
No. 5 Arizona ‍†‍‍^{y}	21	–	9	.700	45	–	18	.714
No. 10 Oregon ‍‍‍^{y}	20	–	10	.667	39	–	16	.709
No. 7 Stanford ‍‍‍^{y}	17	–	10	.630	39	–	17	.696
No. 21 UCLA ‍‍‍^{y}	18	–	12	.600	37	–	20	.649
Arizona State ‍‍‍^{y}	16	–	14	.533	33	–	22	.600
Oregon State ‍‍‍^{y}	16	–	14	.533	37	–	24	.607
California ‍‍‍	15	–	15	.500	29	–	26	.527
Washington State ‍‍‍	13	–	17	.433	26	–	23	.531
USC ‍‍‍	13	–	17	.433	25	–	26	.490
Utah ‍‍‍	7	–	23	.233	17	–	33	.340
Washington ‍‍‍	6	–	21	.222	20	–	30	.400
† – Conference champion y – Invited to the NCAA tournament As of June 23, 2021; Rankings from D1Baseball

The 2021 Arizona State Sun Devils baseball team represented Arizona State University during the 2021 NCAA Division I baseball season. Arizona State was competing in the Pac-12 Conference (Pac-12). The Sun Devils played their home games at Phoenix Municipal Stadium. Coach Tracy Smith was leading Arizona State in his 7th season with the program.

== Previous season ==
The Sun Devils finished 13–4 overall, and 0–0 in the conference. The season was prematurely cut short due to the COVID-19 pandemic.

== Personnel ==
=== Roster ===
2021 Arizona State Sun Devils roster
Pitchers: 3 - Dom Cacchione - (redshirt) Sophomore; 4 - Luke La Flam - (redshirt) Sophomore; 15 - Erik Tolman - (redshirt) Sophomore; 17 - Cooper Benson - (redshirt) Freshman; 19 - Boyd Vander Kooi - (redshirt) Junior; 22 - Blaze Burzell - (redshirt) Sophomore; 23 - Justin Fall - (redshirt) Junior; 24 - Nick Wallerstedt - (redshirt) Freshman; 25 - Will Levine - (redshirt) Sophomore; 26 - Graham Osman - (redshirt) Freshman; 29 - Tyler Thornton - (redshirt) Sophomore; 30 - Brady Corrigan - (redshirt) Junior; 32 - Bryce Barnett - (redshirt) Freshman; 33 - Brock Peery - Freshman; 36 - Seth Tomczak - (redshirt) Freshman; 38 - Joe Hauser - Freshman; 39 - Jared Glenn - Freshman; 40 - Alexander Ogg - (redshirt) Freshman; 41 - Christian Bodlovich - (redshirt) Freshman; 45 - Cam Dennie - (redshirt) Freshman; 48 - Jay Baggs - (redshirt) Freshman	Catchers: 8 - Nick Cheema - (redshirt) Senior; 9 - Sam Ferri - (redshirt) Senior; 20 - Logan Paustian - Freshman; Infielders: 6 - Drew Swift - (redshirt) Junior; 7 - Jack Moss - Freshman; 10 - Sean Mclain - (redshirt) Freshman; 12 - Nathan Baez - (redshirt) Freshman; 14 - Hunter Haas - Freshman; 18 - Brian Kalmer - (redshirt) Freshman; 21 - Conor Davis - (redshirt) Senior; 44 - Blake Pivaroff - Freshman	Outfielders: 5 - Joe Lampe - (redshirt) Freshman; 11 - Kade Higgins - Freshman; 16 - Vinny Tosti - (redshirt) Sophomore; 27 - Hunter Jump - (redshirt) Junior; 28 - Seth Nager - (redshirt) Freshman; 37 - Michael Brueser - Freshman; 47 - Allbry Major - (redshirt) Junior; Utility: 31 - Kai Murphy - (redshirt) Freshman; 35 - Ethan Long - Freshman

=== Coaching staff ===
2021 Arizona State coaching staff
Name	Position	Seasons at Arizona State	Alma mater
Tracy Smith	Head coach	7	Miami (OH)
Ben Greenspan	Associate head coach/recruiting coordinator	7	Indiana
Jason Kelly	Assistant Coach/Pitching Coach	2	Missouri Valley
Michael Earley	Assistant Coach/Hitting Coach	4	Indiana

== Schedule and results ==
Legend
	Sun Devils win
	Sun Devils loss
	Postponement
**Bold**	Sun Devils team member

2021 Arizona State Sun Devils baseball game log
Regular season (18–9)

February (4–2)
Date	Opponent	Rank	Site/stadium	Score	Win	Loss	Save	TV	Overall record	Pac-12 Record
February 19	Sacramento State*	No. 15	Phoenix Municipal Stadium; Phoenix, Arizona	**L** 2–4	Churby (1–0)	**Dennie (0–1)**	—	ASU Live Stream	0–1	—
February 20	Sacramento State*	No. 15	Phoenix Municipal Stadium; Phoenix, Arizona	**W** 2–1	**Thornton (1–0)**	Adams (0–1)	**Long (1)**	ASU Live Stream	1–1	—
February 21	Sacramento State*	No. 15	Phoenix Municipal Stadium; Phoenix, Arizona	**W** 3–1	**Tolman (1–0)**	Saul (0–1)	**Osman (1)**	ASU Live Stream	2–1	—
February 26	Hawaii*	No. 15	Phoenix Municipal Stadium; Phoenix, Arizona	**L** 2–3	Teixeira (1–0)	**Osman (0–1)**	—	ASU Live Stream	2–2	—
February 27	Hawaii*	No. 15	Phoenix Municipal Stadium; Phoenix, Arizona	**W** 6–5	**Fall (1–0)**	Hymel (0–1)	**Long (2)**	ASU Live Stream	3–2	—
February 27	Hawaii*	No. 15	Phoenix Municipal Stadium; Phoenix, Arizona	**W** 9–6	**Glenn (1–0)**	Pindel (0–1)	**Corrigan (1)**	ASU Live Stream	4–2	—

March (11–3)
Date	Opponent	Rank	Site/stadium	Score	Win	Loss	Save	TV	Overall record	Pac-12 Record
March 2	Nevada*	No. 22	Phoenix Municipal Stadium; Phoenix, Arizona	**W** 13–4	**Peery (1–0)**	Morris (1–1)	—	ASU Live Stream	5–2	—
March 5	Utah*	No. 22	Phoenix Municipal Stadium; Phoenix, Arizona	**W** 4–3	**Dennie (1–1)**	Kelly (0–3)	**Long (3)**	ASU Live Stream	6–2	–
March 6	Utah*	No. 22	Phoenix Municipal Stadium; Phoenix, Arizona	**W** 4–1	**Tolman (2–0)**	Robeniol (0–1)	**Bodlovich (1)**	ASU Live Stream	7–2	–
March 7	Utah*	No. 22	Phoenix Municipal Stadium; Phoenix, Arizona	**W** 5–0	**Levine (1–0)**	Clarkson (0–2)	—	ASU Live Stream	8–2	–
March 12	Cal State Fullerton*	No. 18	Phoenix Municipal Stadium; Phoenix, Arizona	**W** 10–0	**Levine (2–0)**	Bibee (2–2)	—	ASU Live Stream	9–2	–
March 13	Cal State Fullerton*	No. 18	Phoenix Municipal Stadium; Phoenix, Arizona	**W** 6–4	**Osman (1–1)**	Luckham (1–3)	**Long (4)**	ASU Live Stream	10–2	–
March 14	Cal State Fullerton*	No. 18	Phoenix Municipal Stadium; Phoenix, Arizona	**W** 5–2	**Fall (2–0)**	Knorr (0–1)	**Levine (1)**	ASU Live Stream	11–2	–
March 16	UNLV*	No. 12	Phoenix Municipal Stadium; Phoenix, Arizona	**L** 9–10	Woods (2–0)	**Levine (2–1)**	–	ASU Live Stream	11–3	—
March 19	at. No. 19 Oregon	No. 12	PK Park; Eugene, Oregon	**W** 6–3	**Glenn (2–0)**	Ahlstrom (1–1)	–	ASU Live Stream	12–3	1–0
March 20	at. No. 19 Oregon	No. 12	PK Park; Eugene, Oregon	**L** 1–7	Kafka (2–0)	**Thornton (1–1)**	—	ASU Live Stream	12–4	1–1
March 21	at. No. 19 Oregon	No. 12	PK Park; Eugene, Oregon	**L** 3–5	Walker (2–1)	**Fall (2–1)**	Somers (3)	ASU Live Stream	12–5	1–2
March 26	Washington State	No. 15	Phoenix Municipal Stadium; Phoenix, Arizona	**W** 10–0	**Peery (2–0)**	White (3–1)	–	ASU Live Stream	13–5	2–2
March 27	Washington State	No. 15	Phoenix Municipal Stadium; Phoenix, Arizona	**W** 5–4	**Levine (3–1)**	Leonard (0–1)	–	ASU Live Stream	14–5	3–2
March 28	Washington State	No. 15	Phoenix Municipal Stadium; Phoenix, Arizona	**W** 9–0	**Fall (3–1)**	Hawkins (1–3)	–	ASU Live Stream	15–5	4–2
March 30	at. UNLV	No. 14	Earl Wilson Stadium; Paradise, Nevada	**Postponed**				ASU Live Stream		–

April (3–4)
Date	Opponent	Rank	Site/stadium	Score	Win	Loss	Save	TV	Overall record	Pac-12 Record
April 1	Arizona	No. 14	Phoenix Municipal Stadium; Phoenix, Arizona	**L** 5–10	Murphy (3–0)	**Corrigan (0–1)**	–	ASU Live Stream	15–6	4–3
April 2	Arizona	No. 14	Phoenix Municipal Stadium; Phoenix, Arizona	**L** 6–7	Vannelle (3–1)	**Osman (1–2)**	Price (3)	ASU Live Stream	15–7	4–4
April 3	Arizona	No. 14	Phoenix Municipal Stadium; Phoenix, Arizona	**W** 3–2	**Fall (4–1)**	Nichols (3–2)	**Levine (2)**	ASU Live Stream	16–7	5–4
April 6	at. Arizona	No. 18	Hi Corbett Field; Tucson, Arizona	**L** 2–14	Abshier (1–0)	**Bodlovich (0–1)**	–	ASU Live Stream	16–8	5–5
April 9	at. Washington	No. 18	Husky Ballpark; Seattle, Washington	**W** 3–2	**Glenn (3–0)**	Delorefice (1–1)	**Bodlovich (2)**	ASU Live Stream	17–8	6–5
April 10	at. Washington	No. 18	Husky Ballpark; Seattle, Washington	**W** 8–1	**Fall (5–1)**	Guerrero (0–1)	–	ASU Live Stream	18–8	7–5
April 11	at. Washington	No. 18	Husky Ballpark; Seattle, Washington	**L** 6–13	Lamb (3–1)	**Hauser (0–1)**	Raeth (1)	ASU Live Stream	18–9	7–6
April 16	Stanford		Phoenix Municipal Stadium; Phoenix, Arizona					ASU Live Stream		–
April 17	Stanford		Phoenix Municipal Stadium; Phoenix, Arizona					ASU Live Stream		–
April 18	Stanford		Phoenix Municipal Stadium; Phoenix, Arizona					ASU Live Stream		–
April 20	Grand Canyon*		Phoenix Municipal Stadium; Phoenix, Arizona					ASU Live Stream		–
April 21	at. Grand Canyon*		Brazell Field at GCU Ballpark; Phoenix, Arizona					ASU Live Stream		–
April 23	at. Utah		Smith's Ballpark; Salt Lake City, Utah					ASU Live Stream		–
April 24	at. Utah		Smith's Ballpark; Salt Lake City, Utah					ASU Live Stream		–
April 25	at. Utah		Smith's Ballpark; Salt Lake City, Utah					ASU Live Stream		–
April 26	at. BYU*		Larry H. Miller Field; Provo, Utah					ASU Live Stream		–
April 30	Rhode Island*		Phoenix Municipal Stadium; Phoenix, Arizona					ASU Live Stream		–

May (0–0)
Date	Opponent	Rank	Site/stadium	Score	Win	Loss	Save	TV	Overall record	Pac-12 Record
May 1	Rhode Island*		Phoenix Municipal Stadium; Phoenix, Arizona					ASU Live Stream		–
May 2	Rhode Island*		Phoenix Municipal Stadium; Phoenix, Arizona					ASU Live Stream		–
May 7	at. California		Evans Diamond; Berkeley, California					ASU Live Stream		–
May 8	at. California		Evans Diamond; Berkeley, California					ASU Live Stream		–
May 9	at. California		Evans Diamond; Berkeley, California					ASU Live Stream		–
May 11	at. Nevada*		William Peccole Park; Reno, Nevada					ASU Live Stream		–
May 14	Oregon State		Phoenix Municipal Stadium; Phoenix, Arizona					ASU Live Stream		–
May 15	Oregon State		Phoenix Municipal Stadium; Phoenix, Arizona					ASU Live Stream		–
May 16	Oregon State		Phoenix Municipal Stadium; Phoenix, Arizona					ASU Live Stream		–
May 19	at. San Diego*		Fowler Park; San Diego, California					ASU Live Stream		–
May 21	at. USC		Dedeaux Field; Los Angeles, California					ASU Live Stream		–
May 22	at. USC		Dedeaux Field; Los Angeles, California					ASU Live Stream		–
May 23	at. USC		Dedeaux Field; Los Angeles, California					ASU Live Stream		–
May 27	UCLA		Phoenix Municipal Stadium; Phoenix, Arizona					ASU Live Stream		–
May 28	UCLA		Phoenix Municipal Stadium; Phoenix, Arizona					ASU Live Stream		–
May 29	UCLA		Phoenix Municipal Stadium; Phoenix, Arizona					ASU Live Stream		–

Postseason (0–0)

NCAA Austin Regional (0–0)
Date	Opponent	Rank	Site/stadium	Score	Win	Loss	Save	TV	Overall record	NCAA Record
June 4	vs. (3) Fairfield	(2) No. 23	UFCU Disch–Falk Field; Austin, Texas					ESPN3		

*Denotes non–conference game • Schedule source • Rankings based on the teams' current ranking in the Collegiate Baseball poll

== Rankings ==
Ranking movements Legend: ██ Increase in ranking ██ Decrease in ranking — = Not ranked RV = Received votes
	Week																		
Poll	Pre	1	2	3	4	5	6	7	8	9	10	11	12	13	14	15	16	17	Final
Coaches'	RV	RV*	RV	RV	23	RV	RV	RV											
Baseball America	—	—	—	—	—	—	—	—											
Collegiate Baseball^	15	15	22	18	12	16	14	18											
NCBWA†	29	—	—	27	26	—	27	27											
D1Baseball	—	—	—	—	—	—	—	—											

^ Collegiate Baseball ranked 40 teams in their preseason poll, but only ranked 30 teams weekly during the season.
† NCBWA ranks 30 teams in their preseason poll, but only ranks 25 teams weekly during the season.
* A new poll was not released for this week, so for comparison purposes, the previous week's ranking is inserted in this week's slot.

== 2021 MLB draft ==
Player	Position	Round	Overall	MLB team
Drew Swift	SS	8	248	Oakland Athletics
Erik Tolman	LHP	14	413	Washington Nationals
Justin Fall	LHP	17	509	Miami Marlins
Cooper Benson	LHP	17	512	Toronto Blue Jays
Tyler Thornton	RHP	17	516	Cleveland Indians
