= 2021 East Carolina Pirates baseball team =

Baseball team season

2021 East Carolina Pirates baseball

AAC Regular season champion NCAA Greenville Regional champion

NCAA Nashville Super Regional, 0–2
- Conference: American Athletic Conference

Ranking
- Coaches: No. 14
- CB: No. 13
- Record: 44–17 (20–8 AAC)
- Head coach: Cliff Godwin (7th season)
- Home stadium: Clark–LeClair Stadium

2021 American Athletic Conference baseball standings
	Conf.				Overall
Team	W		L	PCT	W		L	PCT
No. 12 East Carolina ‍†‍‍^{y}	20	–	8	.714	44	–	17	.721
Tulane ‍‍‍	17	–	10	.630	31	–	24	.564
Wichita State ‍‍‍	18	–	13	.581	31	–	23	.574
Cincinnati ‍‍‍	18	–	14	.563	29	–	26	.527
UCF ‍‍‍	18	–	14	.563	31	–	30	.508
South Florida ‍‍‡‍^{y}	14	–	14	.500	31	–	30	.508
Houston ‍‍‍	7	–	21	.250	19	–	34	.358
Memphis ‍‍‍	7	–	25	.219	18	–	39	.316
† – Conference champion ‡ – Tournament champion y – Invited to the NCAA tournament As of June 13, 2021; Rankings from D1Baseball

The 2021 East Carolina Pirates baseball team represented East Carolina University during the 2021 NCAA Division I baseball season. The Pirates played their home games at Clark–LeClair Stadium as a member of the American Athletic Conference They were led by head coach Cliff Godwin, in his seventh year as head coach.

== Previous season ==
The 2020 East Carolina Pirates baseball team notched a 13–4 (0–0) regular-season record. The season prematurely ended on March 12, 2020, due to concerns over the COVID-19 pandemic.
