= 2021 UC Irvine Anteaters baseball team =

Baseball team season

2021 UC Irvine Anteaters baseball

Big West champion

NCAA tournament, Stanford Regional
- Conference: Big West Conference

Ranking
- Coaches: No. 16
- CB: No. 17
- Record: 40–16 (32–8 Big West)
- Head coach: Ben Orloff (3rd season)
- Assistant coaches: Daniel Bibona (7th season); J. T. Bloodworth (3rd season); Mitch Holland (2nd season)
- Home stadium: Cicerone Field

2021 Big West Conference baseball standings
	Conf.				Overall
Team	W		L	PCT	W		L	PCT
No. 17 UC Irvine ‍†‍‍^{y}	32	–	8	.800	43	–	18	.705
UC Santa Barbara ‍‍‍^{y}	29	–	11	.725	41	–	20	.672
Long Beach State ‍‍‍	26	–	14	.650	28	–	15	.651
Cal Poly ‍‍‍	21	–	19	.525	31	–	25	.554
Cal State Northridge ‍‍‍	21	–	19	.525	21	–	19	.525
UC San Diego ‍‍‍	21	–	19	.525	24	–	28	.462
Cal State Bakersfield ‍‍‍	17	–	19	.472	20	–	23	.465
Hawaii ‍‍‍	16	–	24	.400	24	–	26	.480
Cal State Fullerton ‍‍‍	13	–	23	.361	20	–	35	.364
UC Riverside ‍‍‍	12	–	28	.300	15	–	36	.294
UC Davis ‍‍‍	8	–	32	.200	14	–	43	.246
† – Conference champion y – Invited to the NCAA tournament As of June 7, 2021; Rankings from D1Baseball

The 2021 UC Irvine Anteaters baseball team represented the University of California, Irvine during the 2021 NCAA Division I baseball season. The Anteaters played their home games at Anteater Ballpark as a member of the Big West Conference. They were led by third-year head coach Ben Orloff.

== Previous season ==
The 2020 UC Irvine Anteaters baseball team notched a 8–7 (0–0) regular-season record. The season prematurely ended on March 12, 2020, due to concerns over the COVID-19 pandemic.

== Schedule and results ==
=== Stanford Regional ===
Stanford Regional Teams
(1) Stanford Cardinal	(2) UC Irvine Anteaters	(3) Nevada Wolfpack	(4) North Dakota State Bison

First Round
1	Stanford	9
4	North Dakota State	1
3	Nevada	0
2	UC Irvine	7
Lower round 1
4	North Dakota State	6
3	Nevada	1

Semi-Finals
1	Stanford	12
2	UC Irvine	4
Lower final
4	North Dakota State	3
2	UC Irvine	18

Finals
1	Stanford
2	UC Irvine

== 2021 MLB draft ==
Player	Position	Round	Overall	MLB team
Trenton Denholm	RHP	14	426	Cleveland Indians
Peter Van Loon	RHP	16	467	Baltimore Orioles
Dillon Tatum	C	20	609	Minnesota Twins
