= 2021 Texas Tech Red Raiders baseball team =

Baseball team season

2021 Texas Tech Red Raiders baseball

Lubbock Regional champions Lubbock Super Regional, 0–2
- Conference: Big 12 Conference

Ranking
- Coaches: No. 12
- CB: No. 11
- Record: 39–17 (14–10 Big 12)
- Head coach: Tim Tadlock (9th season)
- Assistant coaches: J-Bob Thomas (9th season); Matt Gardner (9th season); Eric Gutierrez (3rd season)
- Pitching coach: Ray Hayward (9th season)
- Home stadium: Dan Law Field at Rip Griffin Park

2021 Big 12 Conference baseball standings
	Conf.						Overall
Team	W		L		T	PCT	W		L		T	PCT
No. 3 Texas ‍†‍‍^{y}	17	–	7	–	0	.708	50	–	17	–	0	.746
No. 8 TCU ‍†‍‡‍^{y}	17	–	7	–	0	.708	41	–	19	–	0	.683
No. 9 Texas Tech ‍‍‍^{y}	14	–	10	–	0	.583	39	–	17	–	0	.696
No. 23 Oklahoma State ‍‍‍^{y}	12	–	12	–	0	.500	36	–	19	–	1	.652
Oklahoma ‍‍‍	11	–	13	–	0	.458	27	–	28	–	0	.491
Baylor ‍‍‍	11	–	13	–	0	.458	31	–	20	–	0	.608
Kansas State ‍‍‍	10	–	14	–	0	.417	34	–	23	–	0	.596
West Virginia ‍‍‍	8	–	16	–	0	.333	25	–	27	–	0	.481
Kansas ‍‍‍	8	–	16	–	0	.333	30	–	27	–	0	.526
† – Conference champion ‡ – Tournament champion y – Invited to the NCAA tournament As of June 26, 2021; Rankings from D1baseball

The 2021 Texas Tech Red Raiders baseball team represented Texas Tech University during the 2021 NCAA Division I baseball season. The Red Raiders played their home games at Dan Law Field at Rip Griffin Park as a member of the Big 12 Conference. They were led by head coach Tim Tadlock, in his 9th season at Texas Tech.

On March 26, with a 16–6 win over South Florida, Tadlock became the program's second winningest coach with 318 wins. (Note: Larry Hays, who served as the program's head coach from 1987 to 2008, holds the current record for most wins with 813.)

== Previous season ==
The 2020 Texas Tech Red Raiders baseball team notched a 16–3 record in February and early March; however, the remainder of the season was abruptly halted on March 13, 2020, when the Big 12 Conference canceled the remainder of the athletics season due to the Coronavirus pandemic.

== Personnel ==
=== Coaching staff ===
Name	Position	Seasons at Texas Tech	Alma mater
Tim Tadlock	Head coach	9	Texas Tech University (1992)
Matt Gardner	Assistant Coach	9	Oklahoma State University (2008)
J-Bob Thomas	Assistant Coach / Recruiting Coordinator	9	Abilene Christian University (2005)
Ray Hayward	Special Assistant / Pitching Coach	9	University of Oklahoma (1983)
Eric Gutierrez	Volunteer Assistant Coach	3	Texas Tech University (2016)

=== Roster ===
2021 Texas Tech Red Raiders Roster
Pitchers: 8 - Kurt Wilson - Junior; 10 - Mason Montgomery - Sophomore; 11 - Andrew Devine - Freshman; 16 - Hayde Key - Freshman; 25 - Connor Queen - Senior; 28 - Chase Hampton - Freshman; 29 - Jamie Hitt - Freshman; 30 - Nick Gorby - Freshman; 31 - Austin Becker - Sophomore; 32 - Levi Wells - Freshman; 33 - Jakob Brustoski - Junior; 34 - Micah Dallas - Sophomore; 35 - Patrick Monteverde - (redshirt) Senior; 37 - Matthew Luna - Freshman; 38 - Tyler Hamilton - Freshman; 39 - Chase Webster - Sophomore; 40 - Brendan Girton - Freshman; 42 - Hunter Dobbins - Sophomore; 44 - Brandon Beckel - Freshman; 45 - Derek Bridges - Freshman; 46 - Riley Ramsey - Junior; 47 - Eli Riechmann - Sophomore; 48 - Brandon Birdsell - Sophomore; 50 - Leland Wilson - Freshman; 51 - Brandon Petix - Sophomore; 52 - Josh Sanders - Freshman; 55 - Brady LeJeune-DeAcutis - Freshman	Catchers: 21 - Nate Rombach - Freshman; 26 - Braxton Fulford - Junior; Infielders: 2 - Jace Jung - Freshman; 3 - Jackson Cobb - Freshman; 4 - Dru Baker - Sophomore; 5 - Drew Woodcox - Freshman; 13 - Cal Conley - (redshirt) Freshman; 14 - Braydon Runion - Sophomore; 15 - Parker Kelly - Junior; 18 - Cole Stilwell - Sophomore; 19 - Easton Murrell - Junior; Outfielders: 1 - Dillon Carter - Freshman; 7 - Cody Masters - Junior; 9 - Dylan Neuse - Junior; 20 - Max Marusak - Sophomore; 41 - Sam Hunt - Freshman

== Schedule and results ==
2021 Texas Tech Red Raiders baseball game log (39–17)
Regular season (35–13)
February (3–3)

Date	Time (CT)	TV	Opponent	Rank	Stadium	Score	Win	Loss	Save	Attendance	Overall	Big 12	
February 20	7:00 pm	FloSports	vs. #8 Arkansas*	#3	Globe Life Field; Arlington, TX	**L** 9–13	Trest (1–0)	**Devine** (0–1)	—	16,908	0–1	—	Stats; Story
February 21	3:00 pm	FloSports	vs. #6 Ole Miss*	#3	Globe Life Field; Arlington, TX	**L** 4–5	Hoglund (1–0)	**Dallas** (0–1)	Forsyth (1)	17,587	0–2	—	Stats; Story
February 22	11:00 am	FloSports	vs. #7 Mississippi State*	#3	Globe Life Field; Arlington, TX	**L** 5–11	Koestler (1–0)	**Hitt** (0–1)	—	13,659	0–3	—	Stats; Story
February 26	2:00 pm	ESPN+	Houston Baptist*	#10	Dan Law Field; Lubbock, TX	**W** 18–3^{(7)}	**Birdsell** (1–0)	Zarella (0–1)	—	2,270	1–3	—	Stats; Story
February 27	2:00 pm	ESPN+	Houston Baptist*	#10	Dan Law Field; Lubbock, TX	**W** 8–1	**Monteverde** (1–0)	Coats (0–1)	—	2,270	2–3	—	Stats; Story
February 28	1:00 pm	ESPN+	Houston Baptist*	#10	Dan Law Field; Lubbock, TX	**W** 11–2	**Montgomery** (1–0)	Spinney (0–1)	—	2,270	3–3	—	Stats; Story

March (16–1)

Date	Time (CT)	TV	Opponent	Rank	Stadium	Score	Win	Loss	Save	Attendance	Overall	Big 12	
March 2	3:00 pm		Texas Southern*	#10	Dan Law Field; Lubbock, TX	**W** 14–2	**Dallas** (1–1)	Armstrong (0–2)	—	1,808	4–3	—	Stats; Story
March 3	1:00 pm	ESPN+	Texas Southern*	#10	Dan Law Field; Lubbock, TX	**W** 15–0^{(7)}	**Hampton** (1–0)	Olguin (0–1)	—	1,808	5–3	—	Stats; Story
March 5	7:00 pm	AT&T SN SW	vs. Texas State*	#10	Minute Maid Park; Houston, TX	**W** 8–4	**Key** (1–0)	Leigh (0–2)	—	2,197	6–3	—	Stats; Story
March 6	3:00 pm	AT&T SN SW	vs. Sam Houston State*	#10	Minute Maid Park; Houston, TX	**W** 8–0	**Monteverde** (2–0)	Dillard (0–2)	—	3,129	7–3	—	Stats; Story
March 7	11:00 am	AT&T SN SW	vs. TAMU–CC*	#10	Minute Maid Park; Houston, TX	**W** 4–3	**Queen** (1–0)	Thomas (0–1)	**Sublette** (1)		8–3	—	Stats; Story
March 9	6:30 pm	ESPN+	Gonzaga*	#9	Dan Law Field; Lubbock, TX	**W** 5–4	**Wells** (1–0)	Zeglin (1–1)	**Girton** (1)	2,270	9–3	—	Stats; Story
March 10	6:30 pm	ESPN+	Gonzaga*	#9	Dan Law Field; Lubbock, TX	**W** 5–4	**Sublette** (1–0)	Vrieling (0–2)	**Queen** (1)	1,949	10–3	—	Stats; Story
March 12	2:00 pm	ESPN+	UConn*	#9	Dan Law Field; Lubbock, TX	**W** 4–3	**Birdsell** (2–0)	Casparius (1–2)	**Queen** (2)	3,031	11–3	—	Stats; Story
March 13	2:00 pm	ESPN+	UConn*	#9	Dan Law Field; Lubbock, TX	**W** 10–3	**Monteverde** (3–0)	Simeone (0–2)	—	3,538	12–3	—	Stats; Story
March 14	2:00 pm	ESPN+	UConn*	#9	Dan Law Field; Lubbock, TX	**W** 15–13	**Sublette** (2–0)	Peterson (1–1)	**Queen** (3)	3,378	13–3	—	Stats; Story
March 15	10:00 am	ESPN+	UConn*	#7	Dan Law Field; Lubbock, TX	**W** 9–8^{(10)}	**Girton** (1–0)	Wurster (2–1)	—	2,782	14–3	—	Stats; Story
March 19	6:30 pm	ESPN+	#14 Oklahoma State	#7	Dan Law Field; Lubbock, TX	**L** 0–2	Scott (4–1)	**Birdsell** (2–1)	Standlee (3)	4,432	14–4	0–1	Stats; Story
March 20	2:00 pm	ESPN+	#14 Oklahoma State	#7	Dan Law Field; Lubbock, TX	**W** 4–2	**Monteverde** (4–0)	Wrobleski (1–2)	**Dallas** (1)	4,432	15–4	1–1	Stats; Story
March 21	2:00 pm	ESPN+	#14 Oklahoma State	#7	Dan Law Field; Lubbock, TX	**W** 6–5	**Sublette** (3–0)	Osmond (2–1)	**Bridges** (1)	3,733	16–4	2–1	Stats; Story
March 26	6:30 pm	ESPN+	South Florida*	#6	Dan Law Field; Lubbock, TX	**W** 16–6	**Birdsell** (3–1)	Jasiak (2–3)	—	3,785	17–4	—	Stats; Story
March 27	2:00 pm	ESPN+	South Florida*	#6	Dan Law Field; Lubbock, TX	**W** 8–0	**Monteverde** (5–0)	Burns (1–3)	—	4,107	18–4	—	Stats; Story
March 28	1:00 pm	ESPN+	South Florida*	#6	Dan Law Field; Lubbock, TX	**W** 7–4	**Devine** (1–0)	Kerkering (2–1)	**Hampton** (1)	3,008	19–4	—	Stats; Story

April (10–6)

Date	Time (CT)	TV	Opponent	Rank	Stadium	Score	Win	Loss	Save	Attendance	Overall	Big 12	
April 1	6:00 pm	ESPN+	at Kansas State	#4	Tointon Family Stadium; Manhattan, KS	**W** 17–1	**Birdsell** (4–1)	Wicks (4–2)	—	404	20–4	3–1	Stats; Story
April 2	6:00 pm	ESPN+	at Kansas State	#4	Tointon Family Stadium; Manhattan, KS	**L** 2–7	Seymour (2–2)	**Monteverde** (5–1)	Eckberg (4)	587	20–5	3–2	Stats; Story
April 3	4:00 pm	ESPN+	at Kansas State	#4	Tointon Family Stadium; Manhattan, KS	**L** 4–10	McCullough (2–1)	**Montgomery** (1–1)	—	587	20–6	3–3	Stats; Story
April 9	6:30 pm	ESPN+	#10 TCU	#8	Dan Law Field; Lubbock, TX	**L** 3–7	Smith (6–1)	**Dallas** (1–2)	—	4,432	20–7	3–4	Stats
April 10	2:00 pm	ESPN+	#10 TCU	#8	Dan Law Field; Lubbock, TX	**W** 6–5^{(10)}	**Sublette** (4–0)	Ridings (1–1)	—	4,432	21–7	4–4	Stats; Story
April 11	12:00 pm	ESPN+	#10 TCU	#8	Dan Law Field; Lubbock, TX	**W** 17–7^{(7)}	**Key** (2–0)	Ray (2–2)	—	3,896	22–7	5–4	Stats; Story
April 13	6:30 pm	ESPN+	Stephen F. Austin*	#8	Dan Law Field; Lubbock, TX	**W** 4–3	**Webster** (1–0)	Lee (1–1)	—	3,516	23–7	—	Stats; Story
April 14	1:00 pm	ESPN+	Stephen F. Austin*	#8	Dan Law Field; Lubbock, TX	**W** 7–5	**Riechman** (1–0)	Roth (0–1)	**Queen** (4)	2,959	24–7	—	Stats; Story
April 16	5:30 pm	ESPN+	at West Virginia	#8	Mon. County Ballpark; Granville, WV	**W** 7–2	**Monteverde** (6–1)	Wolf (3–4)	—	600	25–7	6–4	Stats; Story
April 17	3:00 pm	ESPN+	at West Virginia	#8	Mon. County Ballpark; Granville, WV	**L** 5–6	Watters (2–0)	**Sublette** (4–1)	—	600	25–8	6–5	Stats; Story
April 18	12:00 pm	ESPN+	at West Virginia	#8	Mon. County Ballpark; Granville, WV	**W** 10–1	**Montgomery** (2–1)	Hampton (3–1)	—	600	26–8	7–5	Stats; Story
April 20	6:30 pm	ESPNU	vs. Oklahoma	#5	Hodgetown; Amarillo, TX	**Postponed to May 4**							
April 23	6:30 pm	ESPN+	Baylor	#5	Dan Law Field; Lubbock, TX	**L** 4–12	Thomas (5–2)	**Monteverde** (6–2)	—	4,432	26–9	7–6	Stats; Story
April 24	2:00 pm	ESPN+	Baylor	#5	Dan Law Field; Lubbock, TX	**W** 4–1	**Sublette** (5–1)	Winston (6–3)	—	4,432	27–9	8–6	Stats; Story
April 25	2:00 pm	ESPN+	Baylor	#5	Dan Law Field; Lubbock, TX	**L** 3–13	Helton (3–2)	**Montgomery** (2–2)	—	4,031	27–10	8–7	Stats; Story
April 28	12:00 pm	ESPN+	New Mexico	#11	Dan Law Field; Lubbock, TX	**W** 10–4	**Girton** (2–0)	Garley (0–2)	—	2,967	28–10	—	Stats; Story
April 30	2:00 pm	LHN	at #3 Texas	#11	UFCU Disch–Falk Field; Austin, TX	**W** 6–3	**Sublette** (6–1)	Madden (6–2)	**Queen** (5)	1,902	29–10	9–7	Stats; Story

May (6–3)

Date	Time (CT)	TV	Opponent	Rank	Stadium	Score	Win	Loss	Save	Attendance	Overall	Big 12	
May 1	12:00 pm	LHN	at #3 Texas	#11	UFCU Disch–Falk Field; Austin, TX	**W** 5–3	**Dallas** (2–0)	Stevens (7–2)	**Sublette** (2)	2,163	30–10	10–7	Stats; Story
May 2	2:30 pm	LHN	at #3 Texas	#11	UFCU Disch–Falk Field; Austin, TX	**L** 3–11	Hansen (5–1)	**Montgomery** (2–3)	—	2,457	30–11	10–8	Stats; Story
May 4	6:00 pm	ESPN+	vs. Oklahoma*	#8	Hodgetown; Amarillo, TX	**W** 14–4	**Hampton** (2–0)	Christian (0–1)	—	6,898	31–11	—	Stats; Story
May 7	6:30 pm	ESPN+	UIC*	#8	Dan Law Field; Lubbock, TX	**Canceled**							
May 8	12:00 pm	ESPN+	UIC*	#8	Dan Law Field; Lubbock, TX	**Canceled**							
May 8	4:00 pm	ESPN+	UIC*	#8	Dan Law Field; Lubbock, TX	**Canceled**							
May 9	1:00 pm	ESPN+	UIC*	#8	Dan Law Field; Lubbock, TX	**Canceled**							
May 14	6:30 pm	Sooner; Sports	at Oklahoma	#7	Mitchell Park; Norman, OK	**L** 8–9^{(10)}	Olds (4–5)	**Sublette** (6–2)	—	849	31–12	10–9	Stats; Story
May 15	2:00 pm	BSO	at Oklahoma	#7	Mitchell Park; Norman, OK	**W** 15–2	**Dallas** (3–2)	Carmichael (6–2)	**Queen** (6)	482	32–12	11–9	Stats; Story
May 16	2:00 pm	Sooner; Sports	at Oklahoma	#7	Mitchell Park; Norman, OK	**W** 13–2^{(7)}	**Montgomery** (3–3)	Taggart (1–6)	—	480	33–12	12–9	Stats; Story
May 20	6:30 pm	ESPN+	Kansas	#5	Dan Law Field; Lubbock, TX	**L** 4–7	Barry (2–2)	**Sublette** (6–3)	Ulane (11)	3,323	33–13	12–10	Stats; Story
May 21	6:30 pm	ESPN+	Kansas	#5	Dan Law Field; Lubbock, TX	**W** 13–4	**Dallas** (4–2)	Davis (6–6)	—	3,222	34–13	13–10	Stats; Story
May 22	1:00 pm	ESPN+	Kansas	#5	Dan Law Field; Lubbock, TX	**W** 5–0	**Hampton** (3–0)	Hazelwood (2–4)	—	3,859	35–13	14–10	Stats; Story

Post-season (4–4)
Big 12 Tournament (1–2)

Date	Time (CT)	TV	Opponent	Rank	Stadium	Score	Win	Loss	Save	Attendance	Overall	B12T Record	
May 26	9:00 am	ESPNU	vs. (6) Baylor	#5 (3)	Bricktown Ballpark; Oklahoma City, OK	**W** 11–4	**Montgomery** (4–3)	Caley (2–2)	—	3,756	36–13	1–0	Stats; Story
May 28	9:00 am	ESPN+	vs. #15 (2) TCU	#5 (3)	Bricktown Ballpark; Oklahoma City, OK	**L** 2–7	Smith (7–3)	**Monteverde** (6–3)	Green (12)	3,812	36–14	1–1	Stats; Story
May 28	12:45 pm	ESPN+	vs. (7) Kansas State	#5 (3)	Bricktown Ballpark; Oklahoma City, OK	**L** 2–7	Eckberg (5–5)	**Dallas** (4–3)	—	3,983	36–15	1–2	Stats; Story

NCAA tournament (3–2)

Date	Time (CT)	TV	Opponent	Rank	Stadium	Score	Win	Loss	Save	Attendance	Overall	NCAAT Record	
June 4	11:00 am	ESPNU	(4) Army	#9 (1)	Dan Law Field; Lubbock, TX	**W** 6–3	**Hampton** (4–0)	Loricco (4–2)	**Dallas** (2)	4,606	37–15	1–0	Stats; Story
June 5	8:00 pm	ESPN2	(3) North Carolina	#9 (1)	Dan Law Field; Lubbock, TX	**W** 7–2	**Monteverde** (7–3)	Rapp (1–2)	**Sublette** (3)	4,737	38–15	2–0	Stats; Story
June 6	6:00 pm	ESPN3	#21 (2) UCLA	#9 (1)	Dan Law Field; Lubbock, TX	**W** 8–2	**Montgomery** (5–3)	Mora (2–2)	—	4,737	39–15	3–0	Stats; Story
June 11	2:00 pm	ESPNU	#7 Stanford	#9	Dan Law Field; Lubbock, TX	**L** 3–15	Beck (9–1)	**Hampton** (4–1)	—	4,732	39–16	3–1	Stats; Story
June 12	2:00 pm	ESPNU	#7 Stanford	#9	Dan Law Field; Lubbock, TX	**L** 0–9	Williams (4–2)	**Monteverde** (7–4)	—	4,732	39–17	3–2	Stats; Story

Legend: = Win = Loss = Canceled Bold = Texas Tech team member
"*" indicates a non-conference game.
"#" represents ranking. All rankings from D1Baseball on the date of the contest.
"()" represents postseason seeding in the Big 12 Tournament or NCAA Regional, respectively.

== Rankings ==
Ranking movements Legend: ██ Increase in ranking ██ Decrease in ranking
	Week																
Poll	Pre	1	2	3	4	5	6	7	8	9	10	11	12	13	14	15	Final
Coaches'	4	4*	11	7	6	6	4	8	7	6	11	8	8	5	5	7	12
Baseball America	3	12	11	11	7	6	4	11	11	10	13	8	8	7	7	9	11
Collegiate Baseball^	4	10	15	6	5	4	3	10	9	10	15	11	9	10	11	11	11
NCBWA†	4	13	15	9	4	4	4	10	8	6	11	7	7	4	5	7	15
D1Baseball	3	10	10	9	7	6	4	8	8	5	11	8	7	5	5	9	11

^ Collegiate Baseball ranked 40 teams in their preseason poll, but only ranked 30 teams weekly during the season.
† NCBWA ranks 30 teams in their preseason poll, but only ranks 25 teams weekly during the season.
* A new poll was not released for this week, so for comparison purposes, the previous week's ranking is inserted in this week's slot.

== Players drafted into the MLB ==
Round	Pick	Player	Position	MLB Club
4	126	Cal Conley	SS	Atlanta Braves
4	130	Dru Baker	3B	Tampa Bay Rays
6	170	Braxton Fulford	C	Colorado Rockies
6	191	Mason Montgomery	P	Tampa Bay Rays
7	222	Ryan Sublette	P	Los Angeles Dodgers
8	226	Hunter Dobbins	P	Boston Red Sox
8	239	Patrick Monteverde	P	Miami Marlins
11	339	Brandon Birdsell	P	Minnesota Twins
17	519	Dylan Neuse	2B	Minnesota Twins
