= 2021 Texas Longhorns baseball team =

American college baseball season

2021 Texas Longhorns baseball

Big 12 Regular season champions Austin Regional champions Austin Super Regional champions

College World Series, Semifinals (3–2)
- Conference: Big 12 Conference

Ranking
- Coaches: No. 3
- CB: No. 3
- Record: 50–17 (17–7 Big 12)
- Head coach: David Pierce (5th season)
- Assistant coaches: Sean Allen (5th season); Philip Miller (5th season); Troy Tulowitzki (2nd season)
- Home stadium: UFCU Disch–Falk Field

2021 Big 12 Conference baseball standings
	Conf.						Overall
Team	W		L		T	PCT	W		L		T	PCT
No. 3 Texas ‍†‍‍^{y}	17	–	7	–	0	.708	50	–	17	–	0	.746
No. 8 TCU ‍†‍‡‍^{y}	17	–	7	–	0	.708	41	–	19	–	0	.683
No. 9 Texas Tech ‍‍‍^{y}	14	–	10	–	0	.583	39	–	17	–	0	.696
No. 23 Oklahoma State ‍‍‍^{y}	12	–	12	–	0	.500	36	–	19	–	1	.652
Oklahoma ‍‍‍	11	–	13	–	0	.458	27	–	28	–	0	.491
Baylor ‍‍‍	11	–	13	–	0	.458	31	–	20	–	0	.608
Kansas State ‍‍‍	10	–	14	–	0	.417	34	–	23	–	0	.596
West Virginia ‍‍‍	8	–	16	–	0	.333	25	–	27	–	0	.481
Kansas ‍‍‍	8	–	16	–	0	.333	30	–	27	–	0	.526
† – Conference champion ‡ – Tournament champion y – Invited to the NCAA tournament As of June 26, 2021; Rankings from D1baseball

The 2021 Texas Longhorns baseball team represented the University of Texas at Austin during the 2021 NCAA Division I baseball season. The Longhorns played their home games at UFCU Disch–Falk Field as a member of the Big 12 Conference. They were led by head coach David Pierce, in his fifth season at Texas.

== Personnel ==
=== Roster ===
2021 Texas Longhorns roster
Pitchers: 11 – Tanner Witt – Freshman; 13 – Lucas Gordon – Freshman; 24 – Chase Lummus – (redshirt) Freshman; 27 – Kolby Kubichek – (redshirt) Sophomore; 31 – Reid Taylor – Freshman; 32 – Ty Madden – (redshirt) Sophomore; 33 – Pete Hansen – (redshirt) Freshman; 34 – Cole Quintanilla – (redshirt) Sophomore; 35 – Tristan Stevens – (redshirt) Junior; 38 – Caden Noah – Freshman; 39 – Travis Sthele – Freshman; 40 – Austin Wallace – (redshirt) Freshman; 41 – Aaron Nixon – Freshman; 42 – Dawson Merryman – (redshirt) Sophomore; 45 – Coy Cobb – (redshirt) Sophomore; 46 – Palmer Wenzel – (redshirt) Senior; 47 – Sam Walbridge – (redshirt) Freshman; 49 – Jared Southard – (redshirt) Freshman; 51 – Dalton Porter – Freshman; 54 – Drew Shifflet – (redshirt) Sophomore; 56 – Justin Eckhardt – (redshirt) Freshman; 57 – Lebarron Johnson Jr. – Freshman; 58 – Mason Bryant – (redshirt) Sophomore; 88 – Andre Duplantier II – (redshirt) Freshman	Catchers: 4 – Silas Ardoin – (redshirt) Freshman; 6 – DJ Petrinsky – (redshirt) Senior; 15 – Peyton Powell – (redshirt) Freshman; 29 – Cam Constantine – (redshirt) Freshman; 48 – Caston Peter – (redshirt) Sophomore; Infielders: 0 – Trey Faltine – (redshirt) Freshman; 8 – Dylan Campbell – Freshman; 14 – Murphy Stehly – (redshirt) Junior; 17 – Ivan Melendez – (redshirt) Sophomore; 19 – Mitchell Daly – Freshman; 28 – Lance Ford – (redshirt) Sophomore; 43 – Peter Geib – (redshirt) Sophomore; 52 – Zach Zubia – (redshirt) Junior; 55 – Cam Williams – (redshirt) Junior	Outfielders: 5 – Mike Antico – (redshirt) Senior; 7 – Douglas Hodo III – (redshirt) Freshman; 30 – Eric Kennedy – (redshirt) Sophomore; 44 – Austin Todd – (redshirt) Senior

=== Coaches ===
2021 Texas Longhorns coaching staff
- David Pierce – Head coach – 5th year
- Sean Allen – Assistant coach – 5th year
- Philip Miller – Assistant coach – 5th year
- Troy Tulowitzki – Volunteer assistant coach – 2nd year

==== Starters ====
Pos.	No.	Player.	Year
C	4	Silas Ardoin	Redshirt Freshman
1B	52	Zach Zubia	Redshirt Junior
2B	19	Mitchell Daly	Freshman
3B	55	Cam Williams	Redshirt Junior
SS	0	Trey Faltine	Redshirt Freshman
LF	30	Eric Kennedy	Redshirt Sophomore
CF	5	Mike Antico	Redshirt Senior
RF	7	Douglas Hodo III	Redshirt Freshman
DH	17	Ivan Melendez	Redshirt Sophomore

== Offseason departures ==
=== Players ===
2021 Texas offseason departures
Name	Number	Pos.	Height	Weight	Year	Hometown	Notes
Bryce Elder	13	P	6’2	220	Junior	Decatur, TX	Declared for MLB Draft
Duke Ellis	11	OF	6’2	180	Senior	Nacogdoches, TX	Graduation
Donny Diaz	19	P	6’0	210	Senior	Kingsville, TX	Graduation

==== Transfers ====
Outgoing

Name	No.	Pos.	Height	Weight	Hometown	Year	New school
Brenden Dixon	1	IF	6’1	195	Argyle, TX	Freshman	Weatherford
Kamron Fields	8	P	6’2	198	Garland, TX	Junior	Texas Southern
Owen Meaney	51	P	6’5	235	Houston, TX	Sophomore	

=== 2020 MLB draft ===
Round	Pick	Player	Position	MLB Team
#5	156	Bryce Elder	Pitcher	Atlanta Braves

== Schedule and results ==
2021 Texas Longhorns baseball game log
Legend: = Win = Loss = Canceled Bold = Texas team member
Regular season (40–13)

February (3–4)
Date	Time (CT)	TV	Opponent	Rank	Stadium	Score	Win	Loss	Save	Attendance	Overall record	Big 12 Record	Box Score	Recap
State Farm College Baseball Showdown
February 20	11:00 AM	FloSports	vs. No. 7 Mississippi State*	No. 9	Globe Life Field • Arlington, TX	**L** 3–8	Sims (1–0)	**Madden (0–1)**		16,908	0–1	—	Box Score	Recap
February 21	7:00 PM	FloSports	vs. No. 8 Arkansas*	No. 9	Globe Life Field • Arlington, TX	**L** 0–4	Monke (1–0)	**Stevens (0–1)**	Bolden (1)	17,587	0–2	—	Box Score	Recap
February 22	2:30 PM	FloSports	vs. No. 6 Ole Miss*	No. 9	Globe Life Field • Arlington, TX	**L** 1–8	Diamond (1–0)	**Kubichek (0–1)**		13,659	0–3	—	Box Score	Recap
February 24	7:00 PM	LHN	BYU*	No. 19	UFCU Disch–Falk Field • Austin, TX	**W** 3–1	**Quintanilla (1–0)**	Mabeus (0–2)	**Witt (1)**	1,474	1–3	—	Box Score	Recap
February 25	1:00 PM	LHN	BYU*	No. 19	UFCU Disch–Falk Field • Austin, TX	**W** 12–6	**Wenzel (1–0)**	Robison (1–1)		1,424	2–3	—	Box Score	Recap
February 26	6:30 PM	LHN	BYU*	No. 19	UFCU Disch–Falk Field • Austin, TX	**W** 11–1	**Madden (1–1)**	Nielson (0–1)		1,504	3–3	—	Box Score	Recap
February 27	3:00 PM	LHN	BYU*	No. 19	UFCU Disch–Falk Field • Austin, TX	**L** 4–5	McLaughlin (1–0)	**Noah (0–1)**	McIntyre (1)	1,524	3–4	—	Box Score	Recap

March (14–4)
Date	Time (CT)	TV	Opponent	Rank	Stadium	Score	Win	Loss	Save	Attendance	Overall record	Big 12 Record	Box Score	Recap
March 2	6:30 PM	LHN	TAMU–CC*	No. 19	UFCU Disch–Falk Field • Austin, TX	**W** 12–1	**Kubichek (1–1)**	Ramirez (0–1)		1,455	4–4	—	Box Score	Recap
March 3	6:00 PM	ESPN+	at Texas State*	No. 19	Bobcat Ballpark • San Marcos, TX	**W** 10–3	**Wenzel (2–0)**	Bush (0–1)		700	5–4	—	Box Score	Recap
March 5	6:30 PM	ESPN+	at Houston*	No. 19	Schroeder Park • Houston, TX	**W** 1–0	**Madden (2–1)**	Cherry (1–1)		493	6–4	—	Box Score	Recap
March 6	2:00 PM	ESPN+	at Houston*	No. 19	Schroeder Park • Houston, TX	**L** 2–3 (11)	Schultz (2–0)	**Nixon (0–1)**		328	6–5	—	Box Score	Recap
March 7	1:30 PM	ESPN+	at Houston*	No. 19	Schroeder Park • Houston, TX	**W** 8–2	**Kubichek (2–1)**	Prayer (0–1)		326	7–5	—	Box Score	Recap
March 9	6:30 PM	LHN	Sam Houston State*	No. 19	UFCU Disch–Falk Field • Austin, TX	**W** 15–9	**Hansen (1–0)**	Wesneski (0–1)		1,490	8–5	—	Box Score	Recap
March 12	6:30 PM	LHN	No. 12 South Carolina*	No. 19	UFCU Disch–Falk Field • Austin, TX	**W** 4–1	**Nixon (1–1)**	Sanders (2–1)		1,716	9–5	—	Box Score	Recap
March 13	6:30 PM	LHN	No. 12 South Carolina*	No. 19	UFCU Disch–Falk Field • Austin, TX	**W** 3–0	**Stevens (1–1)**	Brannon (1–1)	**Wenzel (1)**	1,786	10–5	—	Box Score	Recap
March 14	11:00 AM	LHN	No. 12 South Carolina*	No. 19	UFCU Disch–Falk Field • Austin, TX	**W** 8–5	**Witt (1–0)**	Bosnic (1–1)		1,687	11–5	—	Box Score	Recap
March 16	6:30 PM	LHN	UTRGV*	No. 10	UFCU Disch–Falk Field • Austin, TX	**W** 15–2 (7)	**Hansen (2–0)**	Rimac (0–1)		1,766	12–5	—	Box Score	Recap
March 19	6:30 PM	ESPN+	at Baylor	No. 10	Baylor Ballpark • Waco, TX	**W** 5–3	**Madden (3–1)**	Thomas (2–1)	**Nixon (1)**	2,168	13–5	1–0	Box Score	Recap
March 20	3:00 PM	ESPN+	at Baylor	No. 10	Baylor Ballpark • Waco, TX	**W** 4–3	**Stevens (2–1)**	Winston (2–2)	**Nixon (2)**	2,336	14–5	2–0	Box Score	Recap
March 21	1:00 PM	ESPN+	at Baylor	No. 10	Baylor Ballpark • Waco, TX	**L** 2–11	Kettler (2–0)	**Kubichek (2–2)**		1,753	14–6	2–1	Box Score	Recap
March 23	6:30 PM	LHN	Incarnate Word*	No. 9	UFCU Disch–Falk Field • Austin, TX	**W** 10–1	**Quintanilla (2–0)**	Walker (0–1)		1,538	15–6	—	Box Score	Recap
March 26	7:00 PM	LHN	Oklahoma	No. 9	UFCU Disch–Falk Field • Austin, TX	**W** 4–3 (11)	**Quintanilla (3–0)**	Taggart (0–2)		1,906	16–6	3–1	Box Score	Recap
March 27	5:30 PM	LHN	Oklahoma	No. 9	UFCU Disch–Falk Field • Austin, TX	**W** 11–6	**Stevens (3–1)**	Godman (0–1)		1,980	17–6	4–1	Box Score	Recap
March 28	1:00 PM	LHN	Oklahoma	No. 9	UFCU Disch–Falk Field • Austin, TX	**L** 2–3	Ruffcorn (2–0)	**Nixon (1–2)**		1,931	17–7	4–2	Box Score	Recap
March 30	6:00 PM	ESPNU	at Texas A&M* (Lone Star Showdown)	No. 5	Olsen Field • College Station, TX	**L** 0–2	Dettmer (3–1)	**Hansen (2–1)**	Jozwiak (3)	3,087	17–8	—	Box Score	Recap

April (17–2)
Date	Time (CT)	TV	Opponent	Rank	Stadium	Score	Win	Loss	Save	Attendance	Overall record	Big 12 Record	Box Score	Recap
April 1	6:00 PM	ESPN+	at Kansas	No. 5	Hoglund Ballpark • Lawrence, KS	**W** 5–2	**Madden (4–1)**	Ryan (3–3)		417	18–8	5–2	Box Score	Recap
April 2	6:00 PM	ESPN+	at Kansas	No. 5	Hoglund Ballpark • Lawrence, KS	**W** 7–0	**Stevens (4–1)**	Larsen (4–2)		421	19–8	6–2	Box Score	Recap
April 3	1:00 PM	ESPN+	at Kansas	No. 5	Hoglund Ballpark • Lawrence, KS	**W** 11–2	**Kubichek (3–2)**	Davis (3–3)		435	20–8	7–2	Box Score	Recap
April 6	6:30 PM	LHN	TAMU–CC*	No. 4	UFCU Disch–Falk Field • Austin, TX	**W** 14–4	**Wenzel (3–0)**	Johnson (0–2)		1,596	21–8	—	Box Score	Recap
April 7	6:30 PM	LHN	Stephen F. Austin*	No. 4	UFCU Disch–Falk Field • Austin, TX	**W** 9–1	**Hansen (3–1)**	Stobart (0–4)		1,599	22–8	—	Box Score	Recap
April 9	6:30 PM	LHN	Kansas State	No. 4	UFCU Disch–Falk Field • Austin, TX	**W** 13–6	**Nixon (2–2)**	Eckberg (2–2)		1,786	23–8	8–2	Box Score	Recap
April 10	2:30 PM	LHN	Kansas State	No. 4	UFCU Disch–Falk Field • Austin, TX	**W** 15–1	**Stevens (5–1)**	Seymour (2–3)		1,904	24–8	9–2	Box Score	Recap
April 11	1:00 PM	LHN	Kansas State	No. 4	UFCU Disch–Falk Field • Austin, TX	**W** 9–2	**Kubichek (4–2)**	McCullough (2–2)		1,776	25–8	10–2	Box Score	Recap
April 13	6:30 PM	LHN	Nevada*	No. 3	UFCU Disch–Falk Field • Austin, TX	**W** 4–3	**Witt (2–0)**	O’Malley (0–2)	**Nixon (3)**	1,691	26–8	—	Box Score	Recap
April 14	6:30 PM	LHN	Nevada*	No. 3	UFCU Disch–Falk Field • Austin, TX	**W** 6–5	**Nixon (3–2)**	Cochran (1–3)	**Gordon (1)**	1,658	27–8	—	Box Score	Recap
April 16	6:30 PM	LHN	Abilene Christian*	No. 3	UFCU Disch–Falk Field • Austin, TX	**W** 18–0	**Madden (5–1)**	Morgan (0–2)		1,737	28–8	—	Box Score	Recap
April 17	2:30 PM	LHN	Abilene Christian*	No. 3	UFCU Disch–Falk Field • Austin, TX	**W** 3–1	**Stevens (6–1)**	Huffling (4–1)	**Witt (2)**	1,959	29–8	—	Box Score	Recap
April 18	1:00 PM	LHN	Abilene Christian*	No. 3	UFCU Disch–Falk Field • Austin, TX	**W** 11–1	**Kubichek (5–2)**	Chirpich (3–3)		1,826	30–8	—	Box Score	Recap
April 20	6:00 PM	ESPN+	at Texas State*	No. 3	Bobcat Ballpark • San Marcos, TX	**W** 5–1	**Hansen (4–1)**	Robie (0–1)		700	31–8	—	Box Score	Recap
April 24	2:00 PM	ESPN+	at No. 24 Oklahoma State	No. 3	O'Brate Stadium • Stillwater, OK	**W** 4–3	**Madden (6–1)**	Osmond (2–3)	**Nixon (4)**	4,258	32–8	11–2	Box Score	Recap
April 24	6:00 PM	ESPN+	at No. 24 Oklahoma State	No. 3	O'Brate Stadium • Stillwater, OK	**W** 5–2	**Stevens (7–1)**	Campbell (4–1)	**Witt (3)**	4,258	33–8	12–2	Box Score	Recap
April 25	1:00 PM	ESPN+	at No. 24 Oklahoma State	No. 3	O'Brate Stadium • Stillwater, OK	**L** 3–7	Standlee (4–1)	**Kubichek (5–3)**		3,306	33–9	12–3	Box Score	Recap
April 27	6:30 PM	LHN	Incarnate Word*	No. 3	UFCU Disch–Falk Field • Austin, TX	**W** 5–3	**Shifflet (1–0)**	Celestino (0–1)	**Nixon (5)**	1,610	34–9	—	Box Score	Recap
April 30	7:00 PM	LHN	No. 11 Texas Tech	No. 3	UFCU Disch–Falk Field • Austin, TX	**L** 3–6	Sublette (6–1)	**Madden (6–2)**	Queen (5)	1,902	34–10	12–4	Box Score	Recap

May (6–3)
Date	Time (CT)	TV	Opponent	Rank	Stadium	Score	Win	Loss	Save	Attendance	Overall record	Big 12 Record	Box Score	Recap
May 1	2:30 PM	LHN	No. 11 Texas Tech	No. 3	UFCU Disch–Falk Field • Austin, TX	**L** 3–5	Dallas (2–2)	**Stevens (7–2)**	Sublette (2)	2,163	34–11	12–5	Box Score	Recap
May 2	2:30 PM	LHN	No. 11 Texas Tech	No. 3	UFCU Disch–Falk Field • Austin, TX	**W** 11–3	**Hansen (5–1)**	Montgomery (2–3)		2,457	35–11	13–5	Box Score	Recap
May 4	6:30 PM	LHN	Texas State*	No. 6	UFCU Disch–Falk Field • Austin, TX	**W** 4–1	**Quintanilla (4–0)**	Dixon (0–2)	**Nixon (6)**	1,898	36–11	—	Box Score	Recap
May 7	6:30 PM	ESPN+	at No. 3 TCU	No. 6	Lupton Stadium • Fort Worth, TX	**W** 5–4	**Witt (3–0)**	Hill (2–1)	**Nixon (7)**	3,485	37–11	14–5	Box Score	Recap
May 8	4:00 PM	ESPN+	at No. 3 TCU	No. 6	Lupton Stadium • Fort Worth, TX	**L** 1–2	Krob (7–0)	**Stevens (7–3)**	Green (9)	2,957	37–12	14–6	Box Score	Recap
May 9	1:00 PM	ESPN+	at No. 3 TCU	No. 6	Lupton Stadium • Fort Worth, TX	**W** 9–3	**Hansen (6–1)**	Ray (5–2)		2,912	38–12	15–6	Box Score	Recap
May 11	6:30 PM	LHN	Texas Southern*	No. 5	UFCU Disch–Falk Field • Austin, TX	Canceled due to rain								
May 18	6:30 PM	LHN	Rice*	No. 2	UFCU Disch–Falk Field • Austin, TX	Canceled due to lightning								
May 20	6:30 PM	LHN	West Virginia	No. 2	UFCU Disch–Falk Field • Austin, TX	**L** 4–5	Wolf (5–5)	**Madden (6–3)**	Watters (4)	2,521	38–13	15–7	Box Score	Recap
May 21	6:30 PM	LHN	West Virginia	No. 2	UFCU Disch–Falk Field • Austin, TX	**W** 14–3	**Stevens (8–3)**	Hampton (4–3)		3,164	39–13	16–7	Box Score	Recap
May 22	2:30 PM	LHN	West Virginia	No. 2	UFCU Disch–Falk Field • Austin, TX	**W** 12–2 (8)	**Hansen (7–1)**	Tulloch (–)		2,614	40–13	17–7	Box Score	Recap

Postseason (10–4)

Big 12 tournament (2–2)
Date	Time (CT)	TV	Opponent	Seed	Stadium	Score	Win	Loss	Save	Attendance	Overall record	Tournament record	Box Score	Recap
May 26	4:00 PM	ESPN+	vs. #8 West Virginia	#1	Chickasaw Bricktown Ballpark • Oklahoma City, OK	**L** 1–5	Wolf (6–5)	**Madden (6–4)**		6,164	40–14	0–1	Box Score	Recap
May 27	12:30 PM	ESPNU	vs. #5 Oklahoma	#1	Chickasaw Bricktown Ballpark • Oklahoma City, OK	**W** 4–1	**Stevens (9–3)**	Carmichael (6–3)	**Nixon (8)**	3,972	41–14	1–1	Box Score	Recap
May 28	7:00 PM	ESPN+	vs. #8 West Virginia	#1	Chickasaw Bricktown Ballpark • Oklahoma City, OK	**W** 3–2	**Hansen (8–1)**	Jeffrey (2–2)	**Witt (4)**	5,609	42–14	2–1	Box Score	Recap
May 29	12:30 PM	ESPN+	vs. #4 Oklahoma State	#1	Chickasaw Bricktown Ballpark • Oklahoma City, OK	**L** 4–5	Davis (2–3)	**Nixon (3–3)**	Standlee (4)	5,749	42–15	2–2	Box Score	Recap

NCAA Austin Regional (3–0)
Date	Time (CT)	TV	Opponent	Seed	Stadium	Score	Win	Loss	Save	Attendance	Overall record	Regional Record	Box Score	Recap
June 4	1:00 PM	LHN	#4 Southern	#1	UFCU Disch–Falk Field • Austin, TX	**W** 11–0	**Stevens (10–3)**	Snyder (1–3)		5,447	43–15	1–0	Box Score	Recap
June 5	8:10 PM	LHN	#2 Arizona State	#1	UFCU Disch–Falk Field • Austin, TX	**W** 10–3	**Madden (7–4)**	Fall (7–3)	**Witt (5)**	6,981	44–15	2–0	Box Score	Recap
June 6	8:00 PM	LHN	vs. #3 Fairfield	#1	UFCU Disch–Falk Field • Austin, TX	**W** 12–2	**Hansen (9–1)**	Erbeck (0–1)		6,853	45–15	3–0	Box Score	Recap

NCAA Austin Super Regional (2–0)
Date	Time (CT)	TV	Opponent	National seed	Stadium	Score	Win	Loss	Save	Attendance	Overall record	Super regional record	Box Score	Recap
June 12	8:00 PM	ESPNU	South Florida	#2	UFCU Disch–Falk Field • Austin, TX	**W** 4–3	**Witt (4–0)**	Lord (3–5)		7,180	46–15	1–0	Box Score	Recap
June 13	8:00 PM	ESPNU	vs. South Florida	#2	UFCU Disch–Falk Field • Austin, TX	**W** 12–4	**Stevens (11–3)**	Sullivan (3–4)		7,267	47–15	2–0	Box Score	Recap

College World Series (3–2)
Date	Time (CT)	TV	Opponent	National seed	Stadium	Score	Win	Loss	Save	Attendance	Overall record	CWS record	Box Score	Recap
June 20	6:00 PM	ESPN2	#7 Mississippi State	#2	TD Ameritrade Park Omaha • Omaha, NE	**L** 1–2	Bednar (8-1)	**Madden (7–5)**	Sims (11)	23,885	47–16	0–1	Box Score	Recap
June 22	1:00 PM	ESPNU	#3 Tennessee	#2	TD Ameritrade Park Omaha • Omaha, NE	**W** 8–4	**Witt (5-0)**	Hunley (7-5)		19,150	48–16	1–1	Box Score	Recap
June 24	6:00 PM	ESPN2	vs. Virginia	#2	TD Ameritrade Park Omaha • Omaha, NE	**W** 6–2	**Quintanilla (5–0)**	Wyatt (4–2)	**Nixon (9)**	23,173	49–16	2–1	Box Score	Recap
June 25	6:00 PM	ESPN	vs. #7 Mississippi State	#2	TD Ameritrade Park Omaha • Omaha, NE	**W** 8–5	**Nixon** (4–3)	Smith (4–4)		24,003	50–16	3–1	Box Score	Recap
June 26	6:00 PM	ESPN2	vs. #7 Mississippi State	#2	TD Ameritrade Park Omaha • Omaha, NE	**L** 3–4	Sims (5–0)	**Quintanilla (5-1)**		21,883	50–17	3–2	Box Score	Recap

* indicates a non-conference game. All rankings from D1Baseball on the date of the contest.

== Postseason ==
=== Big 12 tournament ===
Play-in May 25
8	West Virginia	8
9	Kansas	7

First round May 26
1	Texas	1
8	West Virginia	5
4	Oklahoma State	9
5	Oklahoma	5
1	Texas	4
5	Oklahoma	1
3	Texas Tech	11
6	Baylor	4
2	TCU	7
7	Kansas State	6
6	Baylor	4
7	Kansas State	9

Second round May 27–May 28
8	West Virginia	2
4	Oklahoma State	12^{8}
1	Texas	3
8	West Virginia	2
3	Texas Tech	2
2	TCU	7
7	Kansas State	7
3	Texas Tech	2

Semifinals; May 29
4	Oklahoma State	5	-
1	Texas	4	-
2	TCU	2	17^{8}
7	Kansas State	5	7

Finals; May 30
4	Oklahoma State	7
2	TCU	10

=== NCAA tournament ===
==== Austin Super Regional ====
Regional	Regional
1	Texas	11
4	Southern	0
1	Texas	10
2	Arizona State	3
3	Fairfield	6
2	Arizona State	7
Austin Regional – UFCU Disch–Falk Field
4	Southern	2
3	Fairfield	6
3	Fairfield	9
2	Arizona State	7
1	Florida	3
4	South Florida	5
4	South Florida	10
2	Miami (FL)	2
3	South Alabama	0
2	Miami (FL)	1
Gainesville Regional – Florida Ballpark
1	Florida	1
3	South Alabama	19
3	South Alabama	7
2	Miami (FL)	2

Regional Final
1	Texas	12	–
3	Fairfield	2	–
4	South Florida	0	6
3	South Alabama	4	4

Super Regional
2	Texas	4	12	–
South Florida	3	4	–

==== College World Series ====
First round	Second round
NC State	10
9	Stanford	4
NC State	1
4	Vanderbilt	0
5	Arizona	6
4	Vanderbilt	7^{12}
Bracket 1
9	Stanford	14
5	Arizona	5
9	Stanford	5
4	Vanderbilt	6
3	Tennessee	0
Virginia	6
Virginia	5
7	Mississippi State	6
7	Mississippi State	2
2	Texas	1
Bracket 2
3	Tennessee	4
2	Texas	8
2	Texas	6
Virginia	2

Semifinals
NC State	1	–
4	Vanderbilt	3	– (Note: Game declared no contest due to COVID-19 protocols with NC State. Vanderbilt advanced in the tournament.)
7	Mississippi State	5	4
2	Texas	8	3

Finals
4	Vanderbilt	8	2	0
7	Mississippi State	2	13	9

== Awards and honors ==
=== National Awards ===
All-Americans

First Team
Player	No.	Position	Class
Ty Madden	32	P	So
Pete Hansen	33	P	So
Tanner Witt	11	P	Fr

Second Team
Player	No.	Position	Class
Aaron Nixon	41	P	Fr

College World Series

All-Tournament Team
Player	No.	Position	Class
Ivan Melendez	17	DH	So

ABCA Regional Coach of the year

ABCA Regional Coach of the Year
Coach
David Pierce

D1Baseball Assistant of the year

D1Baseball Assistant of the Year
Coach
Sean Allen

=== Big 12 Conference Awards ===
First Team Big 12 All-Conference

First Team Big 12 All-Conference
Player	No.	Position	Class
Mitchell Daly	19	2B	Fr
Ivan Melendez	17	DH	So
Ty Madden	32	P	So
Tristan Stevens	35	P	Jr

Big 12 All-Tournament Team

Big 12 All-Tournament Team
Player	No.	Position	Class
Zach Zubia	52	1B	Jr

Big 12 Conference Pitcher of the year

Big 12 Conference Pitcher of the Year
Player	No.	Position	Class
Ty Madden	32	P	So

Big 12 Conference Manager of the year

Big 12 Conference Manager of the Year
Coach
David Pierce

== Player statistics ==
=== Batting ===
Note: No. = Number; G = Games played; AB = At bats; H = Hits; Avg. = Batting average; HR = Home runs; RBI = Runs batted in

Note: Gold Highlight = Team Leader

Note: leaders must meet the minimum requirement of 2 PA/G and 75% of games played

No.	Player	G	AB	H	Avg.	HR	RBI
0	Trey Faltine	66	217	54	.249	5	37
4	Silas Ardoin	60	184	44	.239	1	33
5	Mike Antico	66	231	63	.273	10	47
6	DJ Petrinksy	33	66	16	.242	1	11
7	Douglas Hodo III	64	221	62	.281	5	44
8	Dylan Campbell	32	53	10	.189	1	7
11	Tanner Witt	34	13	3	.231	0	0
14	Murphy Stehly	29	51	15	.294	0	7
15	Peyton Powell	9	11	3	.273	1	2
17	Ivan Melendez	59	204	65	.319	13	51
19	Mitchell Daly	61	209	66	.316	2	31
28	Lance Ford	20	10	1	.100	0	0
29	Cam Constantine	1	1	0	.000	0	0
30	Eric Kennedy	65	233	59	.253	4	27
43	Peter Geib	5	1	1	1.000	1	3
44	Austin Todd	6	24	7	.292	0	2
48	Caston Peter	2	0	0	.000	0	0
51	Dalton Porter	17	19	5	.263	1	3
52	Zach Zubia	66	231	66	.286	11	61
55	Cam Williams	61	207	61	.295	12	51

=== Pitching ===
Note: leaders must meet the minimum requirement of 1 IP/G

Player	G	GS	IP	W	L	ERA	SO	SV
Will Swope	0	0	0	0	0	0.00	0	0
Tanner Witt	28	0	57.0	5	0	3.16	73	5
Lucas Gordon	19	1	21.2	0	0	3.32	19	1
Chase Lummus	0	0	0	0	0	0.00	0	0
Kolby Kubichek	12	12	51.1	5	3	3.86	41	0
Reid Taylor	0	0	0	0	0	0.00	0	0
Ty Madden	18	18	113.2	7	5	2.45	137	0
Pete Hansen	19	14	91.0	9	1	3.31	80	0
Cole Quintanilla	26	0	40.0	5	1	1.35	42	0
Tristan Stevens	18	18	111.1	11	3	3.27	77	0
Caden Noah	3	0	2.1	0	1	11.57	3	0
Travis Sthele	0	0	0	0	0	0.00	0	0
Austin Wallace	1	0	2.0	0	0	4.50	0	0
Aaron Nixon	27	0	34.0	4	3	2.12	35	9
Dawson Merryman	3	0	2.2	0	0	10.12	4	0
Coy Cobb	6	0	6.0	0	0	7.50	1	5
Palmer Wenzel	17	0	21.2	3	0	3.32	13	1
Sam Walbridge	3	0	2.0	0	0	9.00	4	0
Jared Southard	12	0	10.0	0	0	0.00	16	0
Drew Shifflet	11	0	15.2	1	0	4.02	14	0
Justin Eckhardt	6	4	13.1	0	0	6.75	5	0
Lebarron Johnson Jr.	0	0	0	0	0	0.00	0	0
Mason Bryant	0	0	0	0	0	0.00	0	0
Andre Duplantier II	0	0	0	0	0	0.00	0	0

== Rankings ==
Ranking movements Legend: ██ Increase in ranking ██ Decrease in ranking — = Not ranked RV = Received votes
	Week																		
Poll	Pre	1	2	3	4	5	6	7	8	9	10	11	12	13	14	15	16	17	Final
Coaches'	10	10*	RV	21	12	10	8	6	5	3	3	5	4	3	2	4	4*	4*	3
Baseball America	12	18	20	20	10	9	7	6	4	5	3	9	7	4	4	5	5*	5*	3
Collegiate Baseball^	20	—	—	—	14	9	6	3	3	3	3	5	4	4	4	4	4	2	3
NCBWA†	9	21	19	19	14	9	6	3	3	3	3	5	4	2	2	2	2	2*	4
D1Baseball	9	19	19	19	10	9	5	4	3	3	3	6	5	2	2	3	3*	3*	3

^ Collegiate Baseball ranked 40 teams in their preseason poll, but only ranked 30 teams weekly during the season.
† NCBWA ranks 30 teams in their preseason poll, but only ranks 25 teams weekly during the season.
* A new poll was not released for this week, so for comparison purposes, the previous week's ranking is inserted in this week's slot.
