= Kevin Witt =

American baseball player (born 1976)

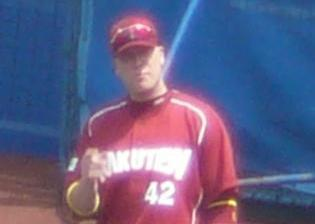
- Witt with the Tohoku Rakuten Golden Eagles in 2007
- Designated hitter / First baseman
- Born: January 5, 1976 (age 50); High Point, North Carolina, U.S.
- Batted: Left Threw: Right

Professional debut
- MLB: September 15, 1998, for the Toronto Blue Jays
- NPB: April 5, 2005, for the Yokohama BayStars

Last appearance
- MLB: September 30, 2006, for the Tampa Bay Devil Rays
- NPB: June 11, 2007, for the Tohoku Rakuten Golden Eagles

MLB statistics
- Batting average: .233
- Home runs: 15
- Runs batted in: 41

NPB statistics
- Batting average: .173
- Home runs: 10
- Runs batted in: 22
- Stats at Baseball Reference

Teams
- Toronto Blue Jays (1998–1999); San Diego Padres (2001); Detroit Tigers (2003); Yokohama BayStars (2005); Tampa Bay Devil Rays (2006); Tohoku Rakuten Golden Eagles (2007)

Kevin Joseph Witt (born January 5, 1976) is an American former professional baseball player. Witt spent parts of five seasons in Major League Baseball (MLB), appearing with the Toronto Blue Jays, San Diego Padres, Detroit Tigers and Tampa Bay Devil Rays, most often as a designated hitter. He also played parts of two seasons in Nippon Professional Baseball (NPB), spending time with the Yokohama BayStars and Tohoku Rakuten Golden Eagles.

== Early life ==
Witt was born in High Point, North Carolina, to Daniel Melvin Witt and his wife, Jean Marie Mechlinski Witt. He has two older brothers, Daniel Melvin Witt Jr. and David Michael Witt. He attended Bishop Kenny High School in Jacksonville, Florida.

== Career ==
Witt was drafted in the first round, 28th overall, by the Toronto Blue Jays in the 1994 Major League Baseball draft. Originally a shortstop, he was converted to first base while in the minors. He made his major league debut with the Blue Jays as a September call-up in 1998, collecting one hit in seven at-bats. In 1999, he collected seven hits in 34 at-bats, good for only a .206 batting average. He also hit his first Major League home run. He spent 2000 in the minors with the Syracuse SkyChiefs (AAA). He was granted free agency on October 15, 2000.

On December 22, 2000, Witt signed with the San Diego Padres. In limited playing time in 2001, Witt hit .185, with two home runs and five runs batted in. On October 6, 2001, Witt pinch-ran for Tony Gwynn, who had recorded his final Major League hit with a double. He was granted free agency on October 15, 2001.

On November 15, 2001, he signed with the Cincinnati Reds. He spent the entire season in the minors with the Louisville Bats(AAA), then was granted free agency on October 15, 2002.

On February 3, 2003, he signed with the Tigers. His only significant playing time came with the Tigers in 2003, when he batted .263 in 93 games while splitting his time between designated hitter, first base, and left field. He also hit 10 home runs and drove in 26 runs, while also stealing his first and only career base. He was granted free agency on October 15, 2003.

On November 19, 2003, he signed with the St. Louis Cardinals. He spent the entire season in the minors with the Memphis Redbirds. He was granted free agency on October 15, 2004.

After spending the 2004 season back in the minor leagues, Witt signed with the BayStars in 2005. He returned to North America the next season, and earned International League Most Valuable Player honors after leading all of minor league baseball with 36 home runs, while setting a Triple-A Durham Bulls franchise record and a Rays' organization record. That earned him one last major league stint, where he batted .148 in 19 games for the Devil Rays. He returned to Japan in 2007 for Rakuten, but hit just .174 in 40 games in what turned out to be his final professional season.

=== As Coach ===
Witt has spent most of his coaching career in the Miami Marlins organization. He was named as the hitting coach for the New Orleans Baby Cakes (Marlins' AAA) for the 2017 season, the hitting coach for the Jacksonville Jumbo Shrimp (Marlins' AA) for the 2018 season, and the hitting coach for the Jupiter Hammerheads (Marlins' High A) for the 2019 season.

== Personal life ==
Witt and his wife Lori (née Long) live in Texas and have four sons: Tanner, Preston, Cullen and Ripken, and a daughter, Skyler. Tanner was an MLB Draft prospect in 2020, but after not being selected in the slimmed-down five round draft, decided he would go on and play for the Texas Longhorns baseball squad. Preston began his playing career at Southwestern University. Tanner was drafted in the 18th round in 2023 by the Baltimore Orioles but chose to return to Texas for his senior season. He was drafted in the 14th round by the New York Mets the following year.
