= 2021 Oklahoma State Cowboys baseball team =

Baseball team season

2021 Oklahoma State Cowboys baseball

NCAA tournament
- Conference: Big 12 Conference
- Record: 36–19–1 (12–12 Big 12)
- Head coach: Josh Holliday (9th season)
- Assistant coaches: Rob Walton (9th season); Marty Lees (5th season); Matt Holliday (2nd season)
- Home stadium: O'Brate Stadium

2021 Big 12 Conference baseball standings
	Conf.						Overall
Team	W		L		T	PCT	W		L		T	PCT
No. 3 Texas ‍†‍‍^{y}	17	–	7	–	0	.708	50	–	17	–	0	.746
No. 8 TCU ‍†‍‡‍^{y}	17	–	7	–	0	.708	41	–	19	–	0	.683
No. 9 Texas Tech ‍‍‍^{y}	14	–	10	–	0	.583	39	–	17	–	0	.696
No. 23 Oklahoma State ‍‍‍^{y}	12	–	12	–	0	.500	36	–	19	–	1	.652
Oklahoma ‍‍‍	11	–	13	–	0	.458	27	–	28	–	0	.491
Baylor ‍‍‍	11	–	13	–	0	.458	31	–	20	–	0	.608
Kansas State ‍‍‍	10	–	14	–	0	.417	34	–	23	–	0	.596
West Virginia ‍‍‍	8	–	16	–	0	.333	25	–	27	–	0	.481
Kansas ‍‍‍	8	–	16	–	0	.333	30	–	27	–	0	.526
† – Conference champion ‡ – Tournament champion y – Invited to the NCAA tournament As of June 26, 2021; Rankings from D1baseball

The 2021 Oklahoma State Cowboys baseball team represented Oklahoma State University during the 2021 NCAA Division I baseball season. The Cowboys played their home games at O'Brate Stadium as a member of the Big 12 Conference. They were led by head coach Josh Holliday, in his 9th season at Oklahoma State.

This was the program's first season at O'Brate Stadium, after the 2020 season was canceled prior to the opening game at the ballpark due to the COVID-19 pandemic.

== Previous season ==
The 2020 Oklahoma State Cowboys baseball team notched a 13–5 record in February and early March; however, the remainder of the season was abruptly halted on March 13, 2020, when the Big 12 Conference canceled the remainder of the athletics season due to the Coronavirus pandemic.

== Personnel ==
=== Coaching staff ===
Name	Position	Seasons at Oklahoma State	Alma mater
Josh Holliday	Head coach	9	Oklahoma State University (1999)
Rob Walton	Assistant Coach - Pitching	9	Oklahoma State University (1986)
Marty Lees	Assistant Coach - Recruiting Coordinator	5	Western Oregon University (1994)
Matt Holliday	Volunteer Assistant Coach	2	Stillwater High School (1998)

=== Roster ===
2021 Oklahoma State Cowboys Roster
Pitchers: 3 - Bryce Osmond - Freshman; 5 - Ben Leeper - RS Senior; 6 - Parker Scott - RS Junior; 22 - Mitchell Stone - RS Sophomore; 25 - Roman Phansalkar - RS Sophomore; 27 - Justin Campbell - Freshman; 30 - John Kelly - Sophomore; 32 – Justin Wrobleski – Sophomore; 34 - Jach Cable - RS Junior; 35 - C.J. Varela - Senior; 38 - Wyatt Cheney - Freshman; 40 - Kale Davis - Freshman; 41 - Colton Bowman - Freshman; 43 - Riley Taylor - RS Freshman; 44 - Nate Peterson - Sophomore; 47 - Tucker Elliott - RS Sophomore; 48 - Brett Standlee - RS Sophomore; 49 - Ryan Van Leeuwen - RS Senior; 51 - Jacob Ruder - RS Senior; 53 - Ryan Bogusz - Freshman; 56 - Spencer Cochran - RS Freshman	Catchers: 31 - Nick DeNicola - RS Junior; 33 - Brock Mathis - Junior; 36 - Josh Spiegel - RS Freshman; Infielders: 1 - Hueston Morrill - Sophomore; 4 - Kaden Polcovich - Junior; 7 - Max Hewitt - Senior; 17 - Jake Thompson - RS Junior; 18 - Dylan Gardner - Junior; 19 - Braley Hollins - Sophomore; 23 - Blake Robertson - Freshman; 24 – Christian Encarnacion-Strand – Sophomore; 42 - Alix Garcia - Senior; 45 - Riley Metzger - Junior	Outfielders: 8 - Cam Thompson - Freshman; 12 - Carson McCusker - Senior; 14 - Noah Sifrit - Junior; 15 - Cade Cabbiness - Senior; 28 - Caeden Trenkle - Freshman; 32 - J.T. Mounce - Freshman

== Schedule and results ==
2021 Oklahoma State Cowboys baseball game log
Regular season (32–16–1)
February (6–0–0)

Date	Time (CT)	TV	Opponent	Rank	Stadium	Score	Win	Loss	Save	Attendance	Overall	Big 12	
February 19	6:30 pm	ESPN+	at Sam Houston State*	#20	Don Sanders Stadium; Huntsville, TX							—	Story
February 20	3:00 pm		at Sam Houston State*	#20	Don Sanders Stadium; Huntsville, TX							—	Story
February 21	1:00 pm	BSN	at Sam Houston State*	#20	Don Sanders Stadium; Huntsville, TX							—	Story
February 21	2:00 pm		at Wichita State*	#20	Eck Stadium; Wichita, KS	**W** 3–1	**Scott** (1–0)	Eddy (0–1)	**Standlee** (1)	1,447	1–0–0	—	Stats; Story
February 22	2:00 pm		at Wichita State*	#20	Eck Stadium; Wichita, KS	**W** 14–6	**Martin** (1–0)	Hynes (0–1)	—	1,468	2–0–0	—	Stats; Story
February 24	4:00 pm	ESPN+	Little Rock*	#20	O'Brate Stadium; Stillwater, OK	**W** 7–2	**Cheney** (1–0)	McKnight (0–1)	—	2,635	3–0–0	—	Stats; Story
February 26	4:00 pm	ESPN+	Illinois State*	#20	O'Brate Stadium; Stillwater, OK	**W** 3–2	**Standlee** (1–0)	Salata (0–1)	—	2,412	4–0–0	—	Stats; Story
February 27	4:00 pm	ESPN+	Illinois State*	#20	O'Brate Stadium; Stillwater, OK	**W** 8–2	**Scott** (2–0)	Sinisko (0–1)	—	2,507	5–0–0	—	Stats; Story
February 28	1:00 pm		Illinois State*	#20	O'Brate Stadium; Stillwater, OK	**W** 6–0	**Osmond** (1–0)	Anderson (0–1)	—	2,413	6–0–0	—	Stats; Story

March (10–6–1)

Date	Time (CT)	TV	Opponent	Rank	Stadium	Score	Win	Loss	Save	Attendance	Overall	Big 12	
March 2	3:00 pm	ESPN+	at Missouri State*	#15	Hammons Field; Springfield, MO	**W** 7–0	**Campbell** (1–0)	Buckner (1–1)	—	605	7–0–0	—	Stats; Story
March 5	4:00 pm		Grand Canyon*	#15	O'Brate Stadium; Stillwater, OK	**W** 11–5	**Scott** (3–0)	Barnes (1–2)	—	2,439	8–0–0	—	Stats; Story
March 6	4:00 pm		Grand Canyon*	#15	O'Brate Stadium; Stillwater, OK	**W** 3–0	**Wrobleski** (1–0)	Ohl (1–1)	**Standlee** (2)	3,105	9–0–0	—	Stats; Story
March 7	12:00 pm		Grand Canyon*	#15	O'Brate Stadium; Stillwater, OK	**T** 4–4	—	—	—	2,685	9–0–1	—	Stats; Story
March 9	6:00 pm	ORUSN	at Oral Roberts*	#13	J. L. Johnson Stadium; Tulsa, OK	**W** 5–0	**Campbell** (2–0)	Davis (0–3)	—	969	10–0–1	—	Stats; Story
March 13	1:00 pm	ESPN+	#2 Vanderbilt*	#13	O'Brate Stadium; Stillwater, OK	**L** 0–5	Rocker (4–0)	**Scott** (3–1)	—	3,480	10–1–1	—	Stats; Story
March 13	6:00 pm	ESPN+	#2 Vanderbilt*	#13	O'Brate Stadium; Stillwater, OK	**L** 4–18	Leiter (4–0)	**Wrobleski** (1–1)	—	3,480	10–2–1	—	Stats; Story
March 14	1:00 pm	ESPN+	#2 Vanderbilt*	#13	O'Brate Stadium; Stillwater, OK	**W** 10–6	**Osmond** (2–0)	Schultz (1–2)	—	3,296	11–2–1	—	Stats; Story
March 16	6:00 pm	FloSports	vs. UL Monroe*	#14	Globe Life Field; Arlington, TX	**L** 6–13	Judice (1–0)	**Walker** (0–1)	—	405	11–3–1	—	Stats; Story
March 19	6:30 pm	ESPN+	at #7 Texas Tech	#14	Dan Law Field; Lubbock, TX	**W** 2–0	**Scott** (4–1)	Birdsell (2–1)	**Standlee** (3)	4,432	12–3–1	1–0–0	Stats; Story
March 20	2:00 pm	ESPN+	at #7 Texas Tech	#14	Dan Law Field; Lubbock, TX	**L** 2–4	Monteverde (4–0)	**Wrobleski** (1–2)	Dallas (1)	4,432	12–4–1	1–1–0	Stats; Story
March 21	2:00 pm	ESPN+	at #7 Texas Tech	#14	Dan Law Field; Lubbock, TX	**L** 5–6	Sublette (3–0)	**Osmond** (2–1)	Bridges (1)	3,733	12–5–1	1–2–0	Stats; Story
March 23	6:00 pm	ESPN+	Missouri State*	#20	O'Brate Stadium; Stillwater, OK	**L** 8–11	Ziegenbein (2–0)	**Kelly** (0–1)	Juenger (1)	2,466	12–6–1	—	Stats; Story
March 26	6:00 pm	ESPN+	Kansas State	#20	O'Brate Stadium; Stillwater, OK	**W** 14–5	**Scott** (5–1)	Wicks (4–1)	—	3,383	13–6–1	2–2–0	Stats; Story
March 27	6:00 pm		Kansas State	#20	O'Brate Stadium; Stillwater, OK	**W** 4–2	**Standlee** (2–0)	Littlejim (1–2)	—	3,846	14–6–1	3–2–0	Stats; Story
March 28	1:00 pm	ESPN+	Kansas State	#20	O'Brate Stadium; Stillwater, OK	**W** 8–2	**Wrobleski** (2–2)	McCullough (1–1)	—	3,203	15–6–1	4–2–0	Stats; Story
March 30	6:00 pm	ESPN+	Oklahoma*	#16	O'Brate Stadium; Stillwater, OK	**W** 5–4	**Standlee** (3–0)	Taggart (0–3)	—	3,559	16–6–1	—	Stats; Story

April (8–7–0)

Date	Time (CT)	TV	Opponent	Rank	Stadium	Score	Win	Loss	Save	Attendance	Overall	Big 12	
April 1	6:00 pm	ESPN+	West Virginia	#16	O'Brate Stadium; Stillwater, OK	**L** 3–4	Wolf (3–2)	**Osmond** (2–2)	Watters (2)	2,751	16–7–1	4–3–0	Stats; Story
April 2	6:00 pm		West Virginia	#16	O'Brate Stadium; Stillwater, OK	**W** 7–2	**Campbell** (3–0)	Tulloch (0–2)	—	2,850	17–7–1	5–3–0	Stats; Story
April 3	1:00 pm	ESPN+	West Virginia	#16	O'Brate Stadium; Stillwater, OK	**W** 21–11^{(8)}	**Martin** (2–0)	Reed (1–2)	—	3,147	18–7–1	6–3–0	Stats; Story
April 10	1:00 pm		UNC Wilmington*	#14	O'Brate Stadium; Stillwater, OK	**W** 7–6	**Scott** (6–1)	Roupp (3–3)	—	2,912	19–7–1	—	Stats; Story
April 10	6:00 pm	ESPN+	UNC Wilmington*	#14	O'Brate Stadium; Stillwater, OK	**W** 10–3	**Campbell** (4–0)	Gesell (2–3)	**Davis** (1)	4,869	20–7–1	—	Stats; Story
April 11	2:00 pm		UNC Wilmington*	#14	O'Brate Stadium; Stillwater, OK	**W** 10–4	**Wrobleski** (3–2)	Calvert (1–1)	—	3,154	21–7–1	—	Stats; Story
April 13	6:00 pm	ESPN+	Oral Roberts*	#13	O'Brate Stadium; Stillwater, OK							—	Story
April 16	6:30 pm	ESPN+	at #12 TCU	#13	Lupton Stadium; Fort Worth, TX	**L** 8–9	King (4–1)	**Davis** (0–1)	Green (8)	2,218	21–8–1	6–4–0	Stats; Story
April 17	2:00 pm	ESPN+	at #12 TCU	#13	Lupton Stadium; Fort Worth, TX	**L** 7–8	Ridings (2–1)	**Standlee** (3–1)	—	2,736	21–9–1	6–5–0	Stats; Story
April 18	1:00 pm	ESPN+	at #12 TCU	#13	Lupton Stadium; Fort Worth, TX	**L** 6–12	King (5–1)	**McLean** (0–1)	—	2,589	21–10–1	6–6–0	Stats; Story
April 20	6:00 pm		Arkansas–Pine Bluff*		O'Brate Stadium; Stillwater, OK	**W** 28–0^{(7)}	**Varela** (1–0)	Horn Jr. (1–3)	—	2,100	22–10–1	—	Stats; Story
April 21	6:00 pm		Arkansas–Pine Bluff*		O'Brate Stadium; Stillwater, OK	**W** 12–2^{(7)}	**Cable** (1–0)	Rieschick (1–1)	—	2,160	23–10–1	—	Stats; Story
April 24	2:00 pm		#3 Texas	#24	O'Brate Stadium; Stillwater, OK	**L** 3–4	Madden (6–1)	**Osmond** (2–3)	Nixon (4)	4,258	23–11–1	6–7–0	Stats; Story
April 24	6:00 pm	ESPN+	#3 Texas	#24	O'Brate Stadium; Stillwater, OK	**L** 2–5	Stevens (7–1)	**Campbell** (4–1)	Witt (3)	4,258	23–12–1	6–8–0	Stats; Story
April 25	1:00 pm	ESPN+	#3 Texas	#24	O'Brate Stadium; Stillwater, OK	**W** 7–3	**Standlee** (4–1)	Kubichek (5–3)	—	3,306	24–12–1	7–8–0	Stats; Story
April 30	6:00 pm	ESPN+	Oklahoma		O'Brate Stadium; Stillwater, OK	**L** 2–16	Olds (3–4)	**Osmond** (2–4)	—	3,830	24–13–1	7–9–0	Stats; Story

May (8–3–0)

Date	Time (CT)	TV	Opponent	Rank	Stadium	Score	Win	Loss	Save	Attendance	Overall	Big 12	
May 1	3:00 pm	BSOK	at Oklahoma		Mitchell Park; Norman, OK	**L** 3–5	Ruffcorn (4–1)	**Davis** (0–2)	—	1,375	24–14–1	7–10–0	Stats; Story
May 2	4:00 pm	ESPNU	at Oklahoma		Mitchell Park; Norman, OK	**W** 8–7^{(12)}	**Davis** (1–2)	Godman (0–2)	—	1,276	25–14–1	8–10–0	Stats; Story
May 7	6:00 pm	ESPN+	at Kansas		Hoglund Ballpark; Lawrence, KS	**W** 13–4	**Stone** (1–0)	Larsen (4–5)	—	481	26–14–1	9–10–0	Stats; Story
May 8	1:00 pm	ESPN+	at Kansas		Hoglund Ballpark; Lawrence, KS	**W** 19–0	**Campbell** (5–1)	Davis (5–5)	—	527	27–14–1	10–10–0	Stats; Story
May 9	1:00 pm	ESPN+	at Kansas		Hoglund Ballpark; Lawrence, KS	**L** 7–8	Ulane (3–0)	**Davis** (1–3)	—	383	27–15–1	10–11–0	Stats; Story
May 11	7:00 pm	ESPN2	at Oklahoma*		ONEOK Field; Tulsa, OK	**W** 7–3	**Sifrit** (1–0)	Ramos (2–1)	—	5,004	28–15–1	—	Stats; Story
May 14	6:00 pm	ESPN+	Baylor		O'Brate Stadium; Stillwater, OK	**W** 8–7^{(11)}	**Martin** (3–0)	Ashkinos (3–1)	—	3,304	29–15–1	11–11–0	Stats; Story
May 15	6:00 pm	ESPN+	Baylor		O'Brate Stadium; Stillwater, OK	**W** 3–1	**Campbell** (6–1)	Kettler (4–3)	**Cable** (1)	3,639	30–15–1	12–11–0	Stats; Story
May 16	6:00 pm	ESPN+	Baylor		O'Brate Stadium; Stillwater, OK	**L** 3–9	Caley (2–1)	**Osmond** (2–5)	—	819	30–16–1	12–12–0	Stats; Story
May 20	6:00 pm	ESPN+	New Orleans*		O'Brate Stadium; Stillwater, OK	**W** 9–6	**Sifrit** (2–0)	Seroski (4–3)	**Martin** (1)	6,362	31–16–1	—	Stats; Story
May 21	6:00 pm		New Orleans*		O'Brate Stadium; Stillwater, OK	**W** 15–1^{(7)}	**Stone** (2–0)	LeBlanc (1–4)	—	3,202	32–16–1	—	Stats; Story
May 22	1:00 pm		New Orleans*		O'Brate Stadium; Stillwater, OK							—	Story

Postseason (4–3–0)
Big 12 Tournament (3–1–0)

Date	Time (CT)	TV	Opponent	Rank	Stadium	Score	Win	Loss	Save	Attendance	Overall	B12T	
May 26	9:00 pm	ESPN+	vs. (5) Oklahoma	(4)	Bricktown Ballpark; Oklahoma City, OK	**W** 9–5	**Campbell** (7–1)	Ruffcorn (4–2)	—	6,618	33–16–1	1–0–0	Stats; Story
May 28	5:00 pm	ESPN+	vs. (8) West Virginia	(4)	Bricktown Ballpark; Oklahoma City, OK	**W** 12–2^{(7)}	**Scott** (7–1)	Reed (4–5)	**Osmond** (1)	5,239	34–16–1	2–0–0	Stats; Story
May 29	1:00 pm	ESPN+	vs. (1) #2 Texas	(4)	Bricktown Ballpark; Oklahoma City, OK	**W** 5–4	**Davis** (2–3)	Nixon (3–3)	**Standlee** (4)	5,749	35–16–1	3–0–0	Stats; Story
May 30	5:00 pm	ESPN2	vs. (2) #15 TCU	(4)	Bricktown Ballpark; Oklahoma City, OK	**L** 7–10	Wright (3–1)	**Bowman** (0–1)	—	7,204	35–17–1	3–1–0	Stats; Story

NCAA tournament (1–2–0)

Date	Time (CT)	TV	Opponent	Rank	Stadium	Score	Win	Loss	Save	Attendance	Overall	NCAAT	
June 4	3:00 pm	ESPN3	vs. (3) UC Santa Barbara	(2) #23	Hi Corbett Field; Tucson, AZ	**L** 4–14	Boone (11–4)	**Campbell** (7–2)	—	2,210	35–18–1	0–1–0	Stats; Story
June 5	3:00 pm	ESPN3	vs. (4) Grand Canyon	(2) #23	Hi Corbett Field; Tucson, AZ	**W** 5–4	**Scott** (8–1)	McCarville (5–3)	**Standlee** (5)	2,336	36–18–1	1–1–0	Stats; Story
June 6	2:00 pm	ESPN3	vs. (3) UC Santa Barbara	(2) #23	Hi Corbett Field; Tucson, AZ	**L** 3–13	Lewis (7–4)	**Stone** (2–1)	—	2,104	36–19–1	1–2–0	Stats; Story

Legend: = Win = Loss = Tie = Canceled Bold = Oklahoma State team member
"*" indicates a non-conference game.
"#" represents ranking. All rankings from D1Baseball on the date of the contest.
"()" represents postseason seeding in the Big 12 Tournament or NCAA Regional, respectively.

== Rankings ==
Ranking movements Legend: ██ Increase in ranking ██ Decrease in ranking — = Not ranked RV = Received votes
	Week																		
Poll	Pre	1	2	3	4	5	6	7	8	9	10	11	12	13	14	15	16	17	Final
Coaches'	18	18*	15	9	11	17	16	13	12	19	20	24	RV	RV	RV	23	23*	23*	RV
Baseball America	—	—	—	19	25	—	—	23	20	—	—	—	—	—	—	22	22*	22*	—
Collegiate Baseball^	17	17	11	11	9	13	11	11	10	20	18	20	21	21	22	20	24	24	24
NCBWA†	26	20	14	10	12	18	17	14	10	19	19	27	RV	28	27	19	28	28*	27
D1Baseball	20	20	15	13	14	20	16	14	13	24	—	—	—	—	—	23	23*	23*	—

^ Collegiate Baseball ranked 40 teams in their preseason poll, but only ranked 30 teams weekly during the season.
† NCBWA ranks 30 teams in their preseason poll, but only ranks 25 teams weekly during the season.
* A new poll was not released for this week, so for comparison purposes, the previous week's ranking is inserted in this week's slot.

== 2021 MLB draft ==
Player	Position	Round	Overall	MLB team
Christian Encarnacion-Strand	3B	4	128	Minnesota Twins
Justin Wrobleski	LHP	11	342	Los Angeles Dodgers
Brett Standlee	RHP	17	506	San Francisco Giants
