= 2021 Big 12 Conference baseball tournament =

American college baseball tournament

- Teams: 9
- Format: Double-elimination tournament
- Finals site: Chickasaw Bricktown Ballpark; Oklahoma City, Oklahoma
- Champions: TCU (3rd title)
- Winning coach: Jim Schlossnagle (3rd title)
- MVP: Porter Brown (TCU)
- Television: Bracket Play: ESPN+, ESPNU; Championship: ESPN2

2021 Big 12 Conference baseball standings
	Conf.						Overall
Team	W		L		T	PCT	W		L		T	PCT
No. 3 Texas ‍†‍‍^{y}	17	–	7	–	0	.708	50	–	17	–	0	.746
No. 8 TCU ‍†‍‡‍^{y}	17	–	7	–	0	.708	41	–	19	–	0	.683
No. 9 Texas Tech ‍‍‍^{y}	14	–	10	–	0	.583	39	–	17	–	0	.696
No. 23 Oklahoma State ‍‍‍^{y}	12	–	12	–	0	.500	36	–	19	–	1	.652
Oklahoma ‍‍‍	11	–	13	–	0	.458	27	–	28	–	0	.491
Baylor ‍‍‍	11	–	13	–	0	.458	31	–	20	–	0	.608
Kansas State ‍‍‍	10	–	14	–	0	.417	34	–	23	–	0	.596
West Virginia ‍‍‍	8	–	16	–	0	.333	25	–	27	–	0	.481
Kansas ‍‍‍	8	–	16	–	0	.333	30	–	27	–	0	.526
† – Conference champion ‡ – Tournament champion y – Invited to the NCAA tournament As of June 26, 2021; Rankings from D1baseball

The 2021 Big 12 Conference baseball tournament was held from May 25 through 30 at Chickasaw Bricktown Ballpark in Oklahoma City, Oklahoma. The annual tournament determines the conference champion of the Division I Big 12 Conference for college baseball. The winner of the tournament earned the league's automatic bid to the 2021 NCAA Division I baseball tournament. It was the first tournament since 2019, after the 2020 season was cancelled due to the COVID-19 pandemic.

== Format and seeding ==
Unlike the preceding and succeeding tournaments, all nine teams made the 2021 tournament. There was a two-bracket double elimination tournament, leading to a winner-take-all championship game. The 8th and 9th placed teams played in a play-in game to determine who will compete in the bracket.

Place	Seed	Team	Conference				Overall			
Place	Seed	Team	W	L	%	GB	W	L	T	%
1	1	Texas	17	7	.708	–	40	13	0	.755
1	2	TCU	17	7	.708	–	37	16	0	.698
3	3	Texas Tech	14	10	.583	3	35	13	0	.729
4	4	Oklahoma State	12	12	.500	5	32	16	1	.663
5	5	Oklahoma	11	13	.458	6	27	26	0	.509
5	6	Baylor	11	13	.458	6	31	18	0	.633
7	7	Kansas State	10	14	.417	7	31	22	0	.585
8	8	West Virginia	8	16	.333	9	23	25	0	.479
8	9	Kansas	8	16	.333	9	30	26	0	.536

== Results ==
Play-in May 25
8	West Virginia	8
9	Kansas	7

First round May 26
1	Texas	1
8	West Virginia	5
4	Oklahoma State	9
5	Oklahoma	5
1	Texas	4
5	Oklahoma	1
3	Texas Tech	11
6	Baylor	4
2	TCU	7
7	Kansas State	6
6	Baylor	4
7	Kansas State	9

Second round May 27–May 28
8	West Virginia	2
4	Oklahoma State	12^{8}
1	Texas	3
8	West Virginia	2
3	Texas Tech	2
2	TCU	7
7	Kansas State	7
3	Texas Tech	2

Semifinals; May 29
4	Oklahoma State	5	-
1	Texas	4	-
2	TCU	2	17^{8}
7	Kansas State	5	7

Finals; May 30
4	Oklahoma State	7
2	TCU	10

== Conference championship game ==
Big 12 Championship
(2) TCU Horned Frogs	vs.	(4) Oklahoma State Cowboys

May 30, 5 p.m. (CDT) at Chickasaw Bricktown Ballpark in Oklahoma City, Oklahoma
Team	1	2	3	4	5	6	7	8	9	R	H	E
Oklahoma State	0	0	5	0	0	0	1	1	0	7	8	0
TCU	0	2	2	1	5	0	0	0	X	10	9	2
WP: G. Wright (3–1) LP: C. Bowman (0–1); Attendance: 7204

== All-Tournament team ==
Position	Player	School
C	Zach Humphreys	TCU
1B	Zach Zubia	Texas
2B	Gray Rodgers	TCU
SS	Maui Ahuna	Kansas
3B	Christian Encarnacion-Strand	Oklahoma State
OF	Zach Kokoska	Kansas State
OF	Caeden Trenkle	Oklahoma State
OF	Porter Brown	TCU
DH	Hunter Wolfe	TCU
SP	Justin Campbell	Oklahoma State
SP	Jackson Wolf	West Virginia
RP	Eric Torres	Kansas State
MOP	Porter Brown	TCU
