= 2021 Kansas State Wildcats baseball team =

American college baseball season

2021 Kansas State Wildcats baseball
- Conference: Big 12 Conference
- Record: 15–11 (2–4 Big 12)
- Head coach: Pete Hughes (3rd season)
- Assistant coaches: Buck Taylor (3rd season); Austin Wates (3rd season); Thomas Hughes (1st season)
- Home stadium: Tointon Family Stadium

2021 Big 12 Conference baseball standings
	Conf.						Overall
Team	W		L		T	PCT	W		L		T	PCT
No. 3 Texas ‍†‍‍^{y}	17	–	7	–	0	.708	50	–	17	–	0	.746
No. 8 TCU ‍†‍‡‍^{y}	17	–	7	–	0	.708	41	–	19	–	0	.683
No. 9 Texas Tech ‍‍‍^{y}	14	–	10	–	0	.583	39	–	17	–	0	.696
No. 23 Oklahoma State ‍‍‍^{y}	12	–	12	–	0	.500	36	–	19	–	1	.652
Oklahoma ‍‍‍	11	–	13	–	0	.458	27	–	28	–	0	.491
Baylor ‍‍‍	11	–	13	–	0	.458	31	–	20	–	0	.608
Kansas State ‍‍‍	10	–	14	–	0	.417	34	–	23	–	0	.596
West Virginia ‍‍‍	8	–	16	–	0	.333	25	–	27	–	0	.481
Kansas ‍‍‍	8	–	16	–	0	.333	30	–	27	–	0	.526
† – Conference champion ‡ – Tournament champion y – Invited to the NCAA tournament As of June 26, 2021; Rankings from D1baseball

The 2021 Kansas State Wildcats baseball team represented Kansas State University during the 2021 NCAA Division I baseball season. The Wildcats played their home games at Tointon Family Stadium as a member of the Big 12 Conference. They were led by head coach Pete Hughes, in his 3rd season at Kansas State.

== Previous season ==
The 2020 Kansas State Wildcats baseball team notched a 10–7 record in February and early March; however, the remainder of the season was abruptly halted on March 13, 2020, when the Big 12 Conference canceled the remainder of the athletics season due to the Coronavirus pandemic.

== Personnel ==
=== Coaching staff ===
Name	Position	Seasons at K-State	Alma mater
Pete Hughes	Head coach	3	Davidson (1990)
Buck Taylor	Pitching Coach	3	San Francisco State (1995)
Austin Wates	Assistant coach	3	Virginia Tech (2017)
Thomas Hughes	Volunteer Assistant Coach	1	Kansas State (2019)

=== Roster ===
2021 Kansas State Wildcats roster
Pitchers: 5 – Connor McCullough (RHP) – (redshirt) Freshman; 7 – Luke Hauswirth (RHP) – Senior; 8 – Andrew Stratman (RHP) – Junior; 11 – Nico Rodriguez (RHP) – Freshman; 12 – Tyler Eckberg (RHP) – (redshirt) Junior; 13 – Caleb Littlejim (RHP) – Senior; 22 – Zak Herbers (RHP) – Junior; 27 – Gavin Hinchliffe (RHP) – (redshirt) Sophomore; 32 – Wesley Moore (LHP) – Junior; 33 – Jordan Wicks (LHP) – Sophomore; 34 – Tyler Ruhl (RHP) – Freshman; 35 – Carson Seymour (RHP) – (redshirt) Sophomore; 37 – Eric Torres (LHP) – Sophomore; 40 – Griffin Hassall (RHP) – Sophomore; 41 – Grant Nicholson (LHP) – Freshman; 45 – Josh Flack (RHP) – Sophomore; 47 – Brett Wozniak (LHP) – Freshman; 55 – Casey Ford (RHP) – Senior	Catchers: 30 – Chris Ceballos – Senior; 36 – Mason Crews – Sophomore; 38 – Austin Garrett – Junior; 39 – Raphael Pelletier – Freshman; 44 – Dylan Caplinger – Junior; Infielders: 2 – Jaxon Passino – Junior; 3 – Cameron Thompson – Senior; 6 – Terrence Spurlin – Junior; 10 – Kamron William – (redshirt) Junior; 15 – Luke Beckstein – Freshman; 16 – Elijah Dale – Freshman; 17 – Cole Johnson – Sophomore; 18 – Brady Day – Freshman; 20 – Daniel Carinci – Sophomore; 25 – Nick Goodwin – Freshman	Outfielders: 1 – Dom Hughes – Freshman; 4 – Blake Burrows – Sophomore; 23 – Jordan Maxson – Junior; 24 – Dylan Phillips – Sophomore; 26 – Chris Herb – Junior; 28 – Zach Kokoska – Junior; 29 – Chad Shade – Senior; 31 – Kaden Fowler – (redshirt) Junior; 43 – Cameron Uselton – Freshman

== Schedule and results ==
2021 Kansas State Wildcats baseball game log
Regular season (15–11)
February (5–2)

Date	Time (CT)	TV	Opponent	Rank	Stadium	Score	Win	Loss	Save	Attendance	Overall	Big 12	
February 19	1:00 pm	FloSports	vs. Oregon State*		Surprise Stadium; Surprise, AZ	**W** 3–2	**Wicks** (1–0)	Abel (0–1)	**Eckberg** (1)	1,352	1–0	—	Stats; Story
February 20	6:00 pm	FloSports	vs. Gonzaga*		Surprise Stadium; Surprise, AZ	**L** 5–17	Jacob (1–0)	**Flack** (0–1)	—	845	1–1	—	Stats; Story
February 21	6:00 pm	FloSports	vs. New Mexico*		Surprise Stadium; Surprise, AZ	**L** 3–4	Meza (1–0)	**Eckberg** (0–1)	—	368	1–2	—	Stats; Story
February 22	11:00 am	FloSports	vs. Gonzaga*		Surprise Stadium; Surprise, AZ	**W** 6–1	**Ford** (1–0)	Spellacy (0–1)	**Rodriguez** (1)	316	2–2	—	Stats; Story
February 26	3:00 pm	ESPN+	Western Michigan*		Tointon Family Stadium; Manhattan, KS	**W** 9–8	**Passino** (1–0)	Armbrust... (0–1)	**Eckberg** (2)	458	3–2	—	Stats; Story
February 27	2:00 pm	ESPN+	Western Michigan*		Tointon Family Stadium; Manhattan, KS	**W** 11–3	**Seymour** (1–0)	Miller (0–1)	—	587	4–2	—	Stats; Story
February 28	12:00 pm	ESPN+	Western Michigan*		Tointon Family Stadium; Manhattan, KS	**W** 2–1	**McCullough** (1–0)	Huisman (0–1)	**Littlejim** (1)	398	5–2	—	Stats; Story

March (8–8)

Date	Time (CT)	TV	Opponent	Rank	Stadium	Score	Win	Loss	Save	Attendance	Overall	Big 12	
March 5	3:00 pm	ESPN+	Eastern Illinois*		Tointon Family Stadium; Manhattan, KS	**W** 6–3	**Wicks** (2–0)	Hampton (2–1)	**Eckberg** (3)	402	6–2	—	Stats; Story
March 6	1:00 pm	ESPN+	Eastern Illinois*		Tointon Family Stadium; Manhattan, KS	**L** 5–6	Nicholson (2–0)	**Seymour** (1–1)	Stevenson (2)	587	6–3	—	Stats; Story
March 7	1:00 pm	ESPN+	Eastern Illinois*		Tointon Family Stadium; Manhattan, KS	**L** 7–14	Doherty (1–0)	**Eckberg** (0–2)	—	587	6–4	—	Stats; Story
March 9	6:00 pm	ESPN+	South Dakota State*		Tointon Family Stadium; Manhattan, KS	**W** 15–4	**Herbers** (1–0)	McSherry (1–1)	—	378	7–4	—	Stats; Story
March 10	6:00 pm	ESPN+	South Dakota State*		Tointon Family Stadium; Manhattan, KS	**W** 10–0	**Littlejim** (1–0)	Bishop (0–1)	—	297	8–4	—	Stats; Story
March 12	12:00 pm		vs. Northern Illinois*		Reckling Park; Houston, TX	**W** 4–3	**Eckberg** (1–2)	Seebach (0–1)	—	300	9–4	—	Stats; Story
March 13	10:00 am		vs. Northern Illinois*		Reckling Park; Houston, TX	**W** 3–1^{(10)}	**Torres** (1–0)	Michaels (0–1)	—	330	10–4	—	Stats; Story
March 13	2:00 pm		at Rice*		Reckling Park; Houston, TX	**W** 8–3	**Wicks** (3–0)	Garcia (1–1)	—	1,238	11–4	—	Stats; Story
March 14	6:00 pm		at Rice*		Reckling Park; Houston, TX	**L** 0–1	Wood (1–0)	**Littlejim** (1–1)	—	1,041	11–5	—	Stats; Story
March 19	6:00 pm	ESPN+	New Mexico*		Tointon Family Stadium; Manhattan, KS	**W** 7–1	**Wicks** (4–0)	Garley (0–1)	—	587	12–5	—	Stats; Story
March 20	4:00 pm	ESPN+	New Mexico*		Tointon Family Stadium; Manhattan, KS	**L** 4–6	Arbruester (3–1)	**Seymour** (1–2)	Meza (3)	587	12–6	—	Stats; Story
March 21	1:00 pm	ESPN+	New Mexico*		Tointon Family Stadium; Manhattan, KS	**W** 17–8	**Torres** (2–0)	Campa (1–2)	—	587	13–6	—	Stats; Story
March 23	6:00 pm	ESPN+	at Wichita State*		Eck Stadium; Wichita, KS	**L** 1–5	Kaminska (1–0)	**Herbers** (1–1)	Haase (5)	1,818	13–7	—	Stats; Story
March 26	6:00 pm	ESPN+	at #20 Oklahoma State		O'Brate Stadium; Stillwater, OK	**L** 5–14	Scott (5–1)	**Wicks** (4–1)	—	3,383	13–8	0–1	Stats; Story
March 27	6:00 pm	ESPN+	at #20 Oklahoma State		O'Brate Stadium; Stillwater, OK	**L** 2–4	Standlee (2–0)	**Littlejim** (1–2)	—	3,846	13–9	0–2	Stats; Story
March 28	1:00 pm	ESPN+	at #20 Oklahoma State		O'Brate Stadium; Stillwater, OK	**L** 2–8	Wrobleski (2–2)	**McCullough** (1–1)	—	3,203	13–10	0–3	Stats; Story

April (2–1)

Date	Time (CT)	TV	Opponent	Rank	Stadium	Score	Win	Loss	Save	Attendance	Overall	Big 12	
April 1	6:00 pm	ESPN+	#4 Texas Tech		Tointon Family Stadium; Manhattan, KS	**L** 1–17	Birdsell (4–1)	**Wicks** (4–2)	—	404	13–11	0–4	Stats; Story
April 2	6:00 pm	ESPN+	#4 Texas Tech		Tointon Family Stadium; Manhattan, KS	**W** 7–2	**Seymour** (2–2)	Monteverde (5–1)	**Eckberg** (4)	587	14–11	1–4	Stats; Story
April 3	4:00 pm	ESPN+	#4 Texas Tech		Tointon Family Stadium; Manhattan, KS	**W** 10–4	**McCullough** (2–1)	Montgomery (1–1)	—	587	15–11	2–4	Stats; Story
April 6	6:00 pm	ESPN+	UAPB*		Tointon Family Stadium; Manhattan, KS							—	
April 7	6:00 pm	ESPN+	UAPB*		Tointon Family Stadium; Manhattan, KS							—	
April 9	TBD	LHN	at #4 Texas		UFCU Disch–Falk Field; Austin, TX								
April 10	TBD	LHN	at #4 Texas		UFCU Disch–Falk Field; Austin, TX								
April 11	TBD	LHN	at #4 Texas		UFCU Disch–Falk Field; Austin, TX								
April 13	6:00 pm	ESPN+	Northern Colorado*		Tointon Family Stadium; Manhattan, KS							—	
April 14	6:00 pm	ESPN+	Northern Colorado*		Tointon Family Stadium; Manhattan, KS							—	
April 16	6:00 pm	ESPN+	Oklahoma		Tointon Family Stadium; Manhattan, KS								
April 17	4:00 pm	ESPN+	Oklahoma		Tointon Family Stadium; Manhattan, KS								
April 18	1:00 pm	ESPN+	Oklahoma		Tointon Family Stadium; Manhattan, KS								
April 23	6:00 pm	ESPN+	West Virginia		Tointon Family Stadium; Manhattan, KS								
April 24	4:00 pm	ESPN+	West Virginia		Tointon Family Stadium; Manhattan, KS								
April 25	11:00 am	ESPN+	West Virginia		Tointon Family Stadium; Manhattan, KS								
April 27	6:00 pm	ESPN+	Missouri*		Tointon Family Stadium; Manhattan, KS							—	
April 30	6:00 pm	ESPN+	Texas Southern*		Tointon Family Stadium; Manhattan, KS							—	

May (0–0)

Date	Time (CT)	TV	Opponent	Rank	Stadium	Score	Win	Loss	Save	Attendance	Overall	Big 12
May 1	4:00 pm	ESPN+	Texas Southern*		Tointon Family Stadium; Manhattan, KS							—
May 2	1:00 pm	ESPN+	Texas Southern*		Tointon Family Stadium; Manhattan, KS							—
May 7	6:30 pm	ESPN+	at Baylor		Baylor Ballpark; Waco, TX							
May 8	3:00 pm	ESPN+	at Baylor		Baylor Ballpark; Waco, TX							
May 9	1:00 pm	ESPN+	at Baylor		Baylor Ballpark; Waco, TX							
May 14	6:00 pm	ESPN+	at Kansas		Hoglund Ballpark; Lawrence, KS							
May 15	2:00 pm	ESPN+	at Kansas		Hoglund Ballpark; Lawrence, KS							
May 16	2:00 pm	ESPN+	at Kansas		Hoglund Ballpark; Lawrence, KS							
May 20	6:00 pm	ESPN+	TCU		Tointon Family Stadium; Manhattan, KS							
May 21	6:00 pm	ESPN+	TCU		Tointon Family Stadium; Manhattan, KS							
May 22	4:00 pm	ESPN+	TCU		Tointon Family Stadium; Manhattan, KS							

Legend: = Win = Loss = Canceled Bold = Kansas State team member
"*" indicates a non-conference game.
"#" represents ranking. All rankings from D1Baseball on the date of the contest.
"()" represents postseason seeding in the Big 12 Tournament or NCAA Regional, respectively.

== Rankings ==
Ranking movements Legend: ██ Increase in ranking ██ Decrease in ranking — = Not ranked RV = Received votes
	Week																		
Poll	Pre	1	2	3	4	5	6	7	8	9	10	11	12	13	14	15	16	17	Final
Coaches'	RV	RV*	—	—	—	—	—	—											
Baseball America	—	—	—	—	—	—	—	—											
Collegiate Baseball^	RV	—	—	—	—	—	—	—											
NCBWA†	RV	RV	RV	—	RV	RV	—	RV											
D1Baseball	—	—	—	—	—	—	—	—											

^ Collegiate Baseball ranked 40 teams in their preseason poll, but only ranked 30 teams weekly during the season.
† NCBWA ranks 30 teams in their preseason poll, but only ranks 25 teams weekly during the season.
* A new poll was not released for this week, so for comparison purposes, the previous week's ranking is inserted in this week's slot.

== 2021 MLB draft ==
Player	Position	Round	Overall	MLB team
Jordan Wicks	LHP	1	21	Chicago Cubs
Carson Seymour	RHP	6	172	New York Mets
Zach Kokoska	OF	10	290	Colorado Rockies
Eric Torres	LHP	12	411	Los Angeles Angels
