= 2021 TCU Horned Frogs baseball team =

Baseball team season

2021 TCU Horned Frogs baseball

Big 12 Regular Season champions Big 12 Tournament champions
- Conference: Big 12 Conference

Ranking
- Coaches: No. 6
- CB: No. 5
- Record: 40–17 (17–7 Big 12)
- Head coach: Jim Schlossnagle (18th season)
- Assistant coaches: Bill Mosiello (8th season); Kirk Saarloos (9th season); John DiLaura (3rd season); Matt Purke (1st season)
- Home stadium: Lupton Stadium

2021 Big 12 Conference baseball standings
	Conf.						Overall
Team	W		L		T	PCT	W		L		T	PCT
No. 3 Texas ‍†‍‍^{y}	17	–	7	–	0	.708	50	–	17	–	0	.746
No. 8 TCU ‍†‍‡‍^{y}	17	–	7	–	0	.708	41	–	19	–	0	.683
No. 9 Texas Tech ‍‍‍^{y}	14	–	10	–	0	.583	39	–	17	–	0	.696
No. 23 Oklahoma State ‍‍‍^{y}	12	–	12	–	0	.500	36	–	19	–	1	.652
Oklahoma ‍‍‍	11	–	13	–	0	.458	27	–	28	–	0	.491
Baylor ‍‍‍	11	–	13	–	0	.458	31	–	20	–	0	.608
Kansas State ‍‍‍	10	–	14	–	0	.417	34	–	23	–	0	.596
West Virginia ‍‍‍	8	–	16	–	0	.333	25	–	27	–	0	.481
Kansas ‍‍‍	8	–	16	–	0	.333	30	–	27	–	0	.526
† – Conference champion ‡ – Tournament champion y – Invited to the NCAA tournament As of June 26, 2021; Rankings from D1baseball

The 2021 TCU Horned Frogs baseball team represented Texas Christian University during the 2021 NCAA Division I baseball season. The Horned Frogs played their home games at Lupton Stadium as a member of the Big 12 Conference. They were led by head coach Jim Schlossnagle, in his 18th and final season at TCU.

== Previous season ==
The 2020 TCU Horned Frogs baseball team notched an 11–4 record in February and early March; however, the remainder of the season was abruptly halted on March 13, 2020, when the Big 12 Conference canceled the remainder of the athletics season due to the Coronavirus pandemic.

== Personnel ==
=== Coaching staff ===
Name	Position	Seasons at TCU	Alma mater
Jim Schlossnagle	Head coach	18	Elon (1992)
Bill Mosiello	Associate head coach	8	Fresno State (1986)
Kirk Saarloos	Assistant Coach/recruiting coordinator	9	Cal State Fullerton (2001)
John DiLaura	Volunteer assistant coach	3	Michigan (2013)
Matt Purke	Student assistant coach	1	TCU

=== Roster ===
2021 TCU Horned Frogs Roster
Pitchers: 12 - Jacob Meador – Freshman; 15 - Riley Cornelio – Freshman; 17 - Jacob Speaker – Freshman; 19 - Harrison Beethe – Junior; 20 - Cam Brown – Freshman; 21 - Charles King – Senior; 23 - Haylen Green – Senior; 24 - John Kodros – RS Sophomore; 26 - Braxton Pearson – Freshman; 29 - Augie Mihlbauer – Junior; 30 - Drew Hill – Junior; 31 - Dalton Brown – RS Senior; 33 - Russell Smith – RS Sophomore; 36 - Marcelo Perez – Sophomore; 37 - Johnny Ray – RS Sophomore; 39 - Austin Krob – Sophomore; 41 - Storm Hierholzer – Freshman; 43 - Christian Williams – Freshman; 44 - River Ridings – Freshman; 46 - Dylan Bright – Freshman; 49 - Garrett Wright – Freshman; 52 - Gehrig Mosiello – Freshman; 53 - Luke Savage – Freshman	Catchers: 4 - Kurtis Byrne – Freshman; 10 - Zach Humphreys – Senior; 13 - Mason Speaker – Freshman; Infielders: 3 - Austin Henry – RS Senior; 7 - Rhett Maynard – Freshman; 9 - Conner Shepherd – RS Senior; 16 - Gene Wood – RS Senior; 18 - Bobby Goodloe – Sophomore; 25 - Tommy Sacco – Junior; 28 - Gray Rodgers – Junior; 55 - Brayden Taylor – Freshman	Outfielders: 1 - Elijah Nunez – Freshman; 5 - Sam Thompson – Freshman; 6 - Hunter Wolfe – RS Senior; 11 - Phillip Sikes – Junior; 27 - Porter Brown – RS Freshman; 38 - Cruz Shope – Junior; 45 - Luke Boyers – Freshman; 48 - Garrison Berkley – Freshman

== Schedule and results ==
2021 TCU Horned Frogs baseball game log
Regular season (34–12)
February (5–2)

Date	Time (CT)	TV	Opponent	Rank	Stadium	Score	Win	Loss	Save	Attendance	Overall	Big 12	
February 20	3:00 pm	FloSports	vs. #6 Ole Miss*	#10	Globe Life Field; Arlington, TX	**L** 3–7	Kimbrell (1–0)	**Ray** (0–1)	Broadway (1)	16,908	0–1	—	Stats; Story
February 21	11:00 am	FloSports	vs. #7 Mississippi State*	#10	Globe Life Field; Arlington, TX	**W** 3–2	**Smith** (1–0)	Harding (0–1)	**Wright** (1)	17,587	1–1	—	Stats; Story
February 22	6:00 pm	FloSports	vs. #8 Arkansas*	#10	Globe Life Field; Arlington, TX	**L** 1–4	Costeiu (1–0)	**King** (0–1)	Kopps (1)	13,659	1–2	—	Stats; Story
February 23	6:30 pm	ESPN+	Texas Southern*	#14	Lupton Stadium; Fort Worth, TX	**W** 20–0	**Brown** (1–0)	Williams (0–1)	—	2,243	2–2	—	Stats; Story
February 26	6:30 pm	ESPN+	Liberty*	#14	Lupton Stadium; Fort Worth, TX	**W** 4–1	**Green** (1–0)	Delaite (0–1)	—	2,206	3–2	—	Stats; Story
February 27	12:00 pm	ESPN+	Liberty*	#14	Lupton Stadium; Fort Worth, TX	**W** 9–2	**King** (1–1)	Meyer (0–1)	—	2,101	4–2	—	Stats; Story
February 27	4:00 pm	ESPN+	Liberty*	#14	Lupton Stadium; Fort Worth, TX	**W** 12–2	**Krob** (1–0)	Gibson (0–2)	—	2,101	5–2	—	Stats; Story

March (12–5)

Date	Time (CT)	TV	Opponent	Rank	Stadium	Score	Win	Loss	Save	Attendance	Overall	Big 12	
March 2	6:30 pm	ESPN+	Stephen F. Austin*	#13	Lupton Stadium; Fort Worth, TX	**W** 9–3	**Meador** (1–0)	Sgambelluri (0–1)	—	2,101	6–2	—	Stats; Story
March 5	3:00 pm	AT&T SW	vs. TAMU–CC*	#13	Minute Maid Park; Houston, TX	**W** 15–5^{(7)}	**Hill** (1–0)	Perez (1–1)	—		7–2	—	Stats; Story
March 6	7:00 pm	AT&T SW	vs. Texas State*	#13	Minute Maid Park; Houston, TX	**W** 10–0^{(8)}	**Smith**; 2–0	Sundgren (0–1)	—		8–2	—	Stats; Story
March 7	3:00 pm	AT&T SW	vs. Sam Houston State*	#13	Minute Maid Park; Houston, TX	**L** 5–6^{(10)}	Havlicek (1–0)	**Wright** (0–1)	—		8–3	—	Stats; Story
March 9	6:00 pm		at Texas State*	#9	Bobcat Ballpark; San Marcos, TX	**L** 1–11^{(7)}	Herrmann (1–0)	**Meador** (1–1)	—	700	8–4	—	Stats; Story
March 10	6:00 pm		at UTSA*	#9	Roadrunner Field; San Antonio, TX	**W** 6–3	**Brown** (2–0)	Ward (0–1)	**Green** (1)	152	9–4	—	Stats; Story
March 12	6:30 pm	ESPN+	Gonzaga*	#9	Lupton Stadium; Fort Worth, TX	**L** 8–13	Mullan (1–0)	**Cornelio** (0–1)	—	1,975	9–5	—	Stats; Story
March 13	2:00 pm	ESPN+	Gonzaga*	#9	Lupton Stadium; Fort Worth, TX	**W** 7–1	**Smith** (3–0)	Kempner (1–1)	**Green** (2)	1,943	10–5	—	Stats; Story
March 14	1:00 pm	ESPN+	Gonzaga*	#9	Lupton Stadium; Fort Worth, TX	**L** 7–10^{(11)}	Naughton (1–0)	**Green** (1–1)	—	2,071	10–6	—	Stats; Story
March 16	6:30 pm	ESPN+	UAPB*	#15	Lupton Stadium; Fort Worth, TX	**W** 20–2^{(7)}	**Cornelio** (1–1)	Mapston (0–2)	—	2,214	11–6	—	Stats; Story
March 19	6:00 pm	ESPN+	at Louisiana*	#15	Moore Field; Lafayette, LA	**L** 2–7	Arrighetti (3–1)	**Smith** (3–1)	—	918	11–7	—	Stats; Story
March 20	2:00 pm	ESPN+	at Louisiana*	#15	Moore Field; Lafayette, LA	**W** 13–4	**Krob** (2–0)	Durke (2–2)	—	902	12–7	—	Stats; Story
March 21	1:00 pm	ESPN+	at Louisiana*	#15	Moore Field; Lafayette, LA	**W** 5–1	**Ray** (1–1)	Robinson (1–1)	**Green** (3)	894	13–7	—	Stats; Story
March 26	6:30 pm	ESPN+	Baylor	#13	Lupton Stadium; Fort Worth, TX	**W** 3–1	**Smith** (4–1)	Thomas (2–2)	**Green** (4)	2,701	14–7	1–0	Stats; Story
March 27	2:00 pm	ESPN+	Baylor	#13	Lupton Stadium; Fort Worth, TX	**W** 11–2	**Krob** (3–0)	Helton (1–2)	—	2,579	15–7	2–0	Stats; Story
March 28	1:00 pm	ESPN+	Baylor	#13	Lupton Stadium; Fort Worth, TX	**W** 10–1	**Ray** (2–1)	Kettler (2–1)	—	2,279	16–7	3–0	Stats; Story
March 30	6:30 pm		at UT Arlington*	#12	Clay Gould Ballpark; Arlington, TX	**W** 5–3	**King** (2–1)	Winquest (0–3)	**Green** (5)	314	17–7	—	Stats; Story

April (14–3)

Date	Time (CT)	TV	Opponent	Rank	Stadium	Score	Win	Loss	Save	Attendance	Overall	Big 12	
April 2	6:30 pm		at Oklahoma	#12	Mitchell Park; Norman, OK	**W** 11–7	**Smith** (5–1)	Olds (1–3)	**Green** (6)	727	18–7	4–0	Stats; Story
April 3	4:00 pm		at Oklahoma	#12	Mitchell Park; Norman, OK	**W** 17–6	**Krob** (4–0)	Bennett (3–2)	—	790	19–7	5–0	Stats; Story
April 4	2:00 pm		at Oklahoma	#12	Mitchell Park; Norman, OK	**W** 7–3	**King** (3–1)	Carmichael (4–1)	—	603	20–7	6–0	Stats; Story
April 6	3:00 pm	ESPN+	at Tarleton State*	#10	Ballow Baseball Complex; Stephenville, TX	**W** 13–9	**Ridings** (1–0)	Cody (0–1)	—	796	21-7	—	Stats; Story
April 9	6:30 pm	ESPN+	at #8 Texas Tech	#10	Dan Law Field; Lubbock, TX	**W** 7–3	**Smith** (6–1)	Dallas (1–2)	—	4,432	22-7	7-0	Stats; Story
April 10	2:00 pm	ESPN+	at #8 Texas Tech	#10	Dan Law Field; Lubbock, TX	**L** 5–6^{(10)}	Sublette (4–0)	**Ridings** (1–1)	—	4,432	22-8	7-1	Stats; Story
April 11	12:00 pm	ESPN+	at #8 Texas Tech	#10	Dan Law Field; Lubbock, TX	**L** 7–17	Key (2–0)	**Ray** (2–2)	—	3,896	22-8	7-2	Stats; Story
April 13	6:30 pm	ESPN+	Tarleton State*	#12	Lupton Stadium; Fort Worth, TX	**W** 10–2	**Perez** (1–0)	Thomas (0–3)	**Green** (7)	2,188	23-9	—	Stats; Story
April 16	6:30 pm	ESPN+	#13 Oklahoma State	#12	Lupton Stadium; Fort Worth, TX	**W** 9–8	**King** (4–1)	Davis (0–1)	**Green** (8)	2,218	24-9	8-2	Stats; Story
April 17	2:00 pm	ESPN+	#13 Oklahoma State	#12	Lupton Stadium; Fort Worth, TX	**W** 8–7	**Ridings** (2–1)	Standlee (3–1)	—	2,736	25-9	9-2	Stats; Story
April 18	1:00 pm	ESPN+	#13 Oklahoma State	#12	Lupton Stadium; Fort Worth, TX	**W** 12–6	**King** (5–1)	McLean (0–1)	—	2,589	26-9	10-2	Stats; Story
April 20	6:30 pm	ESPN+	UT Arlington*	#8	Lupton Stadium; Fort Worth, TX	**W** 9–1	**Savage** (1–0)	Bost (0–1)	—	2,145	27-9	—	Stats; Story
April 23	8:00 pm	ESPN+	Kansas	#8	Lupton Stadium; Fort Worth, TX	**W** 15–1	**Krob** (5–0)	Cyr (3–6)	—	2,136	28-9	11-2	Stats; Story
April 24	4:00 pm	ESPN+	Kansas	#8	Lupton Stadium; Fort Worth, TX	**W** 10–3	**Ray** (3–2)	Larsen (4–4)	—	2,708	29-9	12-2	Stats; Story
April 25	1:00 pm	ESPN+	Kansas	#8	Lupton Stadium; Fort Worth, TX	**L** 1–2	Davis (4–4)	**King** (5–2)	Ulane (8)	2,300	29-10	12-3	Stats; Story
April 27	6:30 pm		at UT Arlington*	#5	Clay Gould Ballpark; Arlington, TX	**W** 8–3	**Savage** (2–0)	Winquest (1–5)	—	314	30-10	—	Stats; Story
April 30	5:30 pm	ESPN+	at West Virginia	#5	Mon. County Ballpark; Granville, WV	**W** 8–2	**Hill** (2–0)	Wolf (3–5)	—	600	31-10	13-3	Stats; Story

May (3–2)

Date	Time (CT)	TV	Opponent	Rank	Stadium	Score	Win	Loss	Save	Attendance	Overall	Big 12	
May 1	1:00 pm	ESPNU	at West Virginia	#5	Mon. County Ballpark; Granville, WV	**W** 5–3	**Krob** (6–0)	Carr (1–4)	**Ridings** (1)	600	32-10	14-3	Stats; Story
May 2	12:00 pm	ESPN+	at West Virginia	#5	Mon. County Ballpark; Granville, WV	**W** 9–1	**Savage** (3–0)	Watters (3–1)	—	600	33-10	15-3	Stats; Story
May 4	6:30 pm	ESPN+	Incarnate Word*		Lupton Stadium; Fort Worth, TX							—	
May 7	7:30 pm	ESPNU	#6 Texas	#3	Lupton Stadium; Fort Worth, TX	**L** 4–5	Witt (3–0)	**Hill** (2–1)	Nixon (7)	3,485	33-11	15-4	Stats; Story
May 8	2:00 pm	ESPNU	#6 Texas	#3	Lupton Stadium; Fort Worth, TX	**W** 2–1	**Krob** (7–0)	Stevens (7–3)	**Green** (9)	2,957	34-11	16-4	Stats; Story
May 9	1:00 pm	ESPN+	#6 Texas	#3	Lupton Stadium; Fort Worth, TX	**L** 3–9	Hansen (6–1)	**Ray** (5–2)	—	2,912	34-12	16-5	Stats; Story
May 11	6:30 pm	ESPN+	UTRGV*		Lupton Stadium; Fort Worth, TX							—	
May 14	6:30 pm	ESPN+	Louisiana–Monroe*	#6	Lupton Stadium; Fort Worth, TX							—	
May 15	4:00 pm	ESPN+	Louisiana–Monroe*	#6	Lupton Stadium; Fort Worth, TX							—	
May 16	1:00 pm	ESPN+	Louisiana–Monroe*	#6	Lupton Stadium; Fort Worth, TX							—	
May 18	6:30 pm	ESPN+	Texas State*		Lupton Stadium; Fort Worth, TX							—	
May 20	6:00 pm	ESPN+	at Kansas State		Tointon Family Stadium; Manhattan, KS								
May 21	6:00 pm	ESPN+	at Kansas State		Tointon Family Stadium; Manhattan, KS								
May 22	1:00 pm	ESPN+	at Kansas State		Tointon Family Stadium; Manhattan, KS								

Legend: = Win = Loss = Canceled Bold = TCU team member
"*" indicates a non-conference game.
"#" represents ranking. All rankings from D1Baseball on the date of the contest.
"()" represents postseason seeding in the Big 12 Tournament or NCAA Regional, respectively.

== Rankings ==
Ranking movements Legend: ██ Increase in ranking ██ Decrease in ranking — = Not ranked
	Week																		
Poll	Pre	1	2	3	4	5	6	7	8	9	10	11	12	13	14	15	16	17	Final
Coaches'	11	11*	9	11	16	12	11	7	10	7	6	3	6						
Baseball America	13	10	10	9	24	24	22	14	15	11	9	5	6						
Collegiate Baseball^	19	19	19	20	—	—	25	6	6	5	5	3	5						
NCBWA†	11	14	12	11	17	13	11	9	12	8	6	2							
D1Baseball	10	14	13	9	15	13	12	10	12	8	5	3	6						

^ Collegiate Baseball ranked 40 teams in their preseason poll, but only ranked 30 teams weekly during the season.
† NCBWA ranks 30 teams in their preseason poll, but only ranks 25 teams weekly during the season.
* A new poll was not released for this week, so for comparison purposes, the previous week's ranking is inserted in this week's slot.

== 2021 MLB draft ==
Player	Position	Round	Overall	MLB team
Russell Smith	RHP	2	51	Milwaukee Brewers
Johnny Ray	RHP	12	365	Chicago White Sox
Phillip Sikes	OF	18	526	Boston Red Sox
Harrison Beethe	RHP	18	529	Kansas City Royals
Marcelo Perez	RHP	20	591	Los Angeles Angels
Haylen Green	LHP	20	605	Chicago White Sox
