= 2021 Baylor Bears baseball team =

American college baseball season

2021 Baylor Bears baseball
- Conference: Big 12 Conference
- Record: 13–7 (1–2 Big 12)
- Head coach: Steve Rodriguez (6th season)
- Assistant coaches: Jon Strauss (6th season); Mike Taylor (6th season); Mitch Karraker (2nd season)
- Home stadium: Baylor Ballpark

2021 Big 12 Conference baseball standings
	Conf.						Overall
Team	W		L		T	PCT	W		L		T	PCT
No. 3 Texas ‍†‍‍^{y}	17	–	7	–	0	.708	50	–	17	–	0	.746
No. 8 TCU ‍†‍‡‍^{y}	17	–	7	–	0	.708	41	–	19	–	0	.683
No. 9 Texas Tech ‍‍‍^{y}	14	–	10	–	0	.583	39	–	17	–	0	.696
No. 23 Oklahoma State ‍‍‍^{y}	12	–	12	–	0	.500	36	–	19	–	1	.652
Oklahoma ‍‍‍	11	–	13	–	0	.458	27	–	28	–	0	.491
Baylor ‍‍‍	11	–	13	–	0	.458	31	–	20	–	0	.608
Kansas State ‍‍‍	10	–	14	–	0	.417	34	–	23	–	0	.596
West Virginia ‍‍‍	8	–	16	–	0	.333	25	–	27	–	0	.481
Kansas ‍‍‍	8	–	16	–	0	.333	30	–	27	–	0	.526
† – Conference champion ‡ – Tournament champion y – Invited to the NCAA tournament As of June 26, 2021; Rankings from D1baseball

The 2021 Baylor Bears baseball team represented Baylor University during the 2021 NCAA Division I baseball season. The Bears played their home games at Baylor Ballpark as a member of the Big 12 Conference. They were led by head coach Steve Rodriguez, in his 6th season at Baylor.

== Previous season ==
The 2020 Baylor Bears baseball team notched a 10–6 record in February and early March; however, the remainder of the season was abruptly halted on March 13, 2020, when the Big 12 Conference canceled the remainder of the athletics season due to the Coronavirus pandemic.

== Personnel ==
=== Coaching staff ===
Name	Position	Seasons at Baylor	Alma mater
Steve Rodriguez	Head coach	6	Pepperdine (2001)
Jon Strauss	Pitching Coach	6	Long Beach State (1996)
Mike Taylor	Hitting Coach	6	Prairie View A&M (1997)
Mitch Karaker	Volunteer Assistant Coach	2	Oregon (2012)

=== Roster ===
2021 Baylor Bears Roster
Pitchers: 10 - Ryan Leckich - Senior; 15 - Will Rigney - Freshman; 16 - Tyler Thomas - Junior; 22 - Blake Helton - Sophomore; 24 - Jimmy Winston - RS Senior; 26 - Hambleton Oliver - Freshman; 27 - Evan Godwin - Freshman; 28 - Hayden Kettler - Senior; 30 - Jacob Ashkinos - RS Junior; 31 - Luke Thompson - Freshman; 34 - Anderson Needham - Sophomore; 35 - Brooks Helmer - Sophomore; 39 - Adam Muirhead - Freshman; 40 - Zac Childers - Freshman; 41 - Luke Boyd - Senior; 43 - Andy Owen - Freshman; 44 - Logan Freeman - Senior; 45 - Travis Hester - RS Sophomore; 46 - Ty Fontenot - Freshman; 49 - Grant Golomb - Freshman; 51 - Cole Stasio - Freshman; 52 - Joey Schott - Freshman; 53 - Drew Leach - Freshman	Catchers: 8 - Kyle Harper - RS Sophomore; 19 - Cade Currington - Freshman; 21 - Nicolas Balsano - Freshman; 25 - Andy Thomas - Senior; 29 - JD Gregson - Freshman; Infielders: 2 - Blake Shapen - Freshman; 3 - Antonio Valdez - Sophomore; 11 - Ricky Martinez - Sophomore; 12 - Esteban Cardoza-Oquendo - Junior; 13 - Alex Gonzales - Freshman; 23 - Kyle Nevin - Freshman; 32 - Tre Richardson - Freshman; 33 - Jack Pineda - Junior; 37 - Chase Wehsener - RS Sophomore; 38 - Chandler Freeman - Freshman; 47 - Beau Wimpee - Freshman	Outfielders: 1 - Nolan Rodriguez - Freshman; 9 - Davion Downey - Junior; 18 - Jared McKenzie - Freshman; 20 - Cam Caley - Freshman; 36 - Ryan Patterson - Freshman; 42 - Jacob Schoenvogel - Freshman; 50 - Ben Kesler - Freshman

== Schedule and results ==
2021 Baylor Bears baseball game log
Regular season (13–7)
February (2–4)

Date	Time (CT)	TV	Opponent	Rank	Stadium	Score	Win	Loss	Save	Attendance	Overall	Big 12	
February 21	11:00 am		at UTRGV*		UTRGV Baseball Stadium; Edinburg, TX	**W** 12–7	**Oliver** (1–0)	Stevens (0–1)	**Ashkinos** (1)	119	1–0	—	Stats; Story
February 21	2:00 pm		at UTRGV*		UTRGV Baseball Stadium; Edinburg, TX	**L** 8–9	Serbantez (1–0)	**Freeman** (0–1)	—	119	1–1	—	Stats; Story
February 22	1:00 pm		at UTRGV*		UTRGV Baseball Stadium; Edinburg, TX	**L** 4–7	Davis (1–0)	**Winston** (0–1)	Bridges (1)		1–2	—	Stats; Story
February 26	6:00 pm	FloSports	vs. Texas A&M*		Dell Diamond; Round Rock, TX	**L** 4–12	Saenz (1–1)	**Helton** (0–1)	—		1–3	—	Stats; Story
February 27	12:00 pm	FloSports	vs. #21 Auburn*		Dell Diamond; Round Rock, TX	**W** 12–6	**Thomas** (1–0)	Fitts (0–1)	—		2–3	—	Stats; Story
February 28	5:00 pm	FloSports	vs. Oklahoma*		Dell Diamond; Round Rock, TX	**L** 3–9	Bennett (1–0)	**Caley** (0–1)	—		2–4	—	Stats; Story

March (11–3)

Date	Time (CT)	TV	Opponent	Rank	Stadium	Score	Win	Loss	Save	Attendance	Overall	Big 12	
March 2	6:30 pm	ESPN+	Sam Houston State*		Baylor Ballpark; Waco, TX	**W** 4–0	**Oliver** (2–0)	Rudis (0–1)	—	1,036	3–4	—	Stats; Story
March 5	6:30 pm	ESPN+	Memphis*		Baylor Ballpark; Waco, TX	**W** 5–4	**Helton** (1–0)	Wimberley (0–1)	**Boyd** (1)	1,250	4–4	—	Stats; Story
March 6	2:00 pm	ESPN+	Memphis*		Baylor Ballpark; Waco, TX	**W** 9–0^{(7)}	**Thomas** (2–0)	Durham (0–1)	—	1,250	5–4	—	Stats; Story
March 6	5:00 pm	ESPN+	Memphis*		Baylor Ballpark; Waco, TX	**W** 20–4	**Winston** (1–1)	Cothren (0–1)	—	1,250	6–4	—	Stats; Story
March 7	1:00 pm	ESPN+	Memphis*		Baylor Ballpark; Waco, TX	**W** 8–7	**Ashkinos** (1–0)	Kelly (1–1)	**Boyd** (2)	1,179	7–4	—	Stats; Story
March 12	6:30 pm	ESPN+	Xavier*		Baylor Ballpark; Waco, TX	**W** 7–3	**Freeman** (1–1)	Chatham (0–1)	—	1,051	8–4	—	Stats; Story
March 13	3:00 pm	ESPN+	Xavier*		Baylor Ballpark; Waco, TX	**W** 11–4	**Winston** (2–1)	Kelly (0–1)	—	1,240	9–4	—	Stats; Story
March 14	1:00 pm	ESPN+	Xavier*		Baylor Ballpark; Waco, TX	**W** 10–0	**Kettler** (1–0)	Bosacker (1–1)	—	1,073	10–4	—	Stats; Story
March 16	6:30 pm	ESPN+	UTSA*		Baylor Ballpark; Waco, TX	**W** 10–8	**Ashkinos** (2–0)	Miller (0–1)	**Boyd** (3)	1,193	11–4	—	Stats; Story
March 17	6:30 pm	ESPN+	Prairie View A&M*		Baylor Ballpark; Waco, TX	**W** 12–2^{(7)}	**Childers** (1–0)	Maldonado (0–2)	—	1,167	12–4	—	Stats; Story
March 19	6:30 pm	ESPN+	#10 Texas		Baylor Ballpark; Waco, TX	**L** 3–5	Madden (3–1)	**Thomas** (2–1)	Nixon (1)	2,168	12–5	0–1	Stats; Story
March 20	3:00 pm	ESPN+	#10 Texas		Baylor Ballpark; Waco, TX	**L** 3–4	Stevens (2–1)	**Winston** (2–2)	Nixon (2)	2,336	12–6	0–2	Stats; Story
March 21	1:00 pm	ESPN+	#10 Texas		Baylor Ballpark; Waco, TX	**W** 11–2	**Kettler** (2–0)	Kubichek (2–2)	—	1,753	13–6	1–2	Stats; Story
March 23	6:30 pm		at UT Arlington*		Clay Gould Ballpark; Arlington, TX	**L** 3–4^{(11)}	Austin (1–0)	**Boyd** (0–1)	—	314	13–7	—	Stats; Story
March 26	6:30 pm	ESPN+	at #13 TCU		Lupton Stadium; Fort Worth, TX								
March 27	2:00 pm	ESPN+	at #13 TCU		Lupton Stadium; Fort Worth, TX								
March 28	1:00 pm	ESPN+	at #13 TCU		Lupton Stadium; Fort Worth, TX								
March 30	6:30 pm	ESPN+	Texas State*		Baylor Ballpark; Waco, TX							—	

April (0–0)

Date	Time (CT)	TV	Opponent	Rank	Stadium	Score	Win	Loss	Save	Attendance	Overall	Big 12
April 1	6:30 pm	ESPN+	North Carolina A&T*		Baylor Ballpark; Waco, TX							—
April 2	2:00 pm	ESPN+	North Carolina A&T*		Baylor Ballpark; Waco, TX							—
April 2	6:00 pm	ESPN+	North Carolina A&T*		Baylor Ballpark; Waco, TX							—
April 3	1:00 pm	ESPN+	North Carolina A&T*		Baylor Ballpark; Waco, TX							—
April 6	6:30 pm	ESPN+	Texas State*		Baylor Ballpark; Waco, TX							—
April 9	7:30 pm	ESPNU	West Virginia		Baylor Ballpark; Waco, TX							
April 10	3:00 pm	ESPN+	West Virginia		Baylor Ballpark; Waco, TX							
April 11	12:00 pm	ESPN+	West Virginia		Baylor Ballpark; Waco, TX							
April 16	6:00 pm		at Kansas		Hoglund Ballpark; Lawrence, KS							
April 17	2:00 pm		at Kansas		Hoglund Ballpark; Lawrence, KS							
April 18	1:00 pm		at Kansas		Hoglund Ballpark; Lawrence, KS							
April 23	6:30 pm	ESPN+	at Texas Tech		Dan Law Field; Lubbock, TX							
April 24	2:00 pm	ESPN+	at Texas Tech		Dan Law Field; Lubbock, TX							
April 25	2:00 pm	ESPN+	at Texas Tech		Dan Law Field; Lubbock, TX							
April 27	6:30 pm	ESPN+	Prairie View A&M*		Baylor Ballpark; Waco, TX							—

May (0–0)

Date	Time (CT)	TV	Opponent	Rank	Stadium	Score	Win	Loss	Save	Attendance	Overall	Big 12
May 7	6:30 pm	ESPN+	Kansas State		Baylor Ballpark; Waco, TX							
May 8	3:00 pm	ESPN+	Kansas State		Baylor Ballpark; Waco, TX							
May 9	1:00 pm	ESPN+	Kansas State		Baylor Ballpark; Waco, TX							
May 11	6:30 pm	ESPN+	Incarnate Word*		Baylor Ballpark; Waco, TX							—
May 14	6:00 pm	ESPN+	at Oklahoma State		O'Brate Stadium; Stillwater, OK							
May 15	1:00 pm	ESPN+	at Oklahoma State		O'Brate Stadium; Stillwater, OK							
May 16	1:00 pm	ESPN+	at Oklahoma State		O'Brate Stadium; Stillwater, OK							
May 20	6:30 pm	ESPN+	Oklahoma		Baylor Ballpark; Waco, TX							
May 21	6:30 pm	ESPN+	Oklahoma		Baylor Ballpark; Waco, TX							
May 22	3:00 pm	ESPN+	Oklahoma		Baylor Ballpark; Waco, TX							

Legend: = Win = Loss = Canceled Bold = Baylor team member
"*" indicates a non-conference game.
"#" represents ranking. All rankings from D1Baseball on the date of the contest.
"()" represents postseason seeding in the Big 12 Tournament or NCAA Regional, respectively.

== Rankings ==
Ranking movements Legend: ██ Increase in ranking ██ Decrease in ranking — = Not ranked RV = Received votes
	Week																		
Poll	Pre	1	2	3	4	5	6	7	8	9	10	11	12	13	14	15	16	17	Final
Coaches'	RV	RV*	—	—	RV	—													
Baseball America	—	—	—	—	—	—													
Collegiate Baseball^	RV	—	—	—	—	—													
NCBWA†	RV	—	—	RV	RV	RV													
D1Baseball	—	—	—	—	—	—													

^ Collegiate Baseball ranked 40 teams in their preseason poll, but only ranked 30 teams weekly during the season.
† NCBWA ranks 30 teams in their preseason poll, but only ranks 25 teams weekly during the season.
* A new poll was not released for this week, so for comparison purposes, the previous week's ranking is inserted in this week's slot.

== 2021 MLB draft ==
Player	Position	Round	Overall	MLB team
Andy Thomas	C	5	144	Seattle Mariners
Luke Boyd	RHP	17	520	San Diego Padres
