= Tanner Witt =

American baseball player (born 2002)

Cleburne Railroaders – No. 27
- Pitcher
- Born: July 11, 2002 (age 24); Houston, Texas, U.S.
- Bats: Right Throws: Right

Tanner Joseph Witt (born July 11, 2002) is an American professional baseball pitcher for the Cleburne Railroaders of the American Association of Professional Baseball.

== Amateur career ==
Witt grew up in Houston, Texas and attended Episcopal High School in Bellaire, Texas. He pitched for the United States Under-15 National team in the 2017 COPABE Pan American Championships. Witt was considered an early-round prospect in the 2020 Major League Baseball draft, but opted to affirm his commitment to play college baseball at the University of Texas.

Witt made 28 appearances as a reliever during his freshman season with the Longhorns and went 5–0 with a 3.16 ERA and 73 strikeouts in 57 innings pitched. After the 2021 season, he played collegiate summer baseball for the Chatham Anglers of the Cape Cod Baseball League. Witt entered his sophomore season as a starter. He tore the ulnar collateral ligament in his pitching elbow in his second start, requiring him to undergo Tommy John surgery and miss the remainder of the season. Witt won both of his starts and had a 1.64 ERA and 14 strikeouts in 11 innings pitched. Texas would go on to make the 2022 College World Series. Witt missed the beginning of his junior season while recovering from the surgery.

Witt was drafted by the Baltimore Orioles in the 18th round of the 2023 MLB draft, but announced on Twitter the next day that he would be returning to Texas for his senior season.

== Professional career ==
=== New York Mets ===
Witt was drafted by the New York Mets in the 14th round, with the 413th overall selection, of the 2024 Major League Baseball draft. He signed with the Mets on July 23, 2024. Witt made his professional with the Single–A St. Lucie Mets; he made one appearance for St. Lucie in 2025, recording three strikeouts across 2 1/3 innings pitched.

Witt split the 2026 season between the High–A Brooklyn Cyclones, Double–A Binghamton Rumble Ponies, and Triple–A Syracuse Mets. In 23 appearances for the three affiliates, he posted a cumulative 3—0 record and 8.03 ERA with 49 strikeouts and one save over 37 innings of work. Witt was released by the Mets organization on August 3, 2026.

=== Cleburne Railroaders ===
On August 12, 2026, Witt signed with the Cleburne Railroaders of the American Association of Professional Baseball.

== Personal life ==
Witt's father, Kevin Witt, played five seasons in the Major Leagues. His mother, Lori, played softball at Texas.
