= Cal Conley =

American baseball player

Atlanta Braves – No. 78
- Shortstop
- Born: July 17, 1999 (age 26); Orlando, Florida
- Bats: Switch Throws: Right
- Stats at Baseball Reference

Career highlights and awards
- Brooks Wallace Award (2021)

Calvin Wayne Conley (born July 17, 1999) is an American baseball shortstop in the Atlanta Braves organization. He played college baseball for the Texas Tech Red Raiders.

== Early life and amateur career ==
Conley grew up in Mount Carmel, Ohio and attended Loveland High School before transferring to West Clermont High School.

Conley enrolled at the University of Miami, but transferred to Texas Tech after his first semester and sat out his true freshman season per NCAA rules. As a redshirt freshman, Conley hit for a .371 average with 24 RBIs in 18 games before the season was cut short due to the coronavirus pandemic. The following season, Conley batted .329 with 15 home runs and 55 RBIs and won the Brooks Wallace Award, given annually to the best shortstop in college baseball.

== Professional career ==
Conley was selected in the fourth round with the 126th overall pick in the 2021 Major League Baseball draft by the Atlanta Braves. He signed with the team on July 20, 2021, and received a $422,500 signing bonus.

Conley made his professional debut with the Augusta GreenJackets in August 2021, batting .214 with two home runs, nine RBIs, and five doubles over 35 games. He returned to Augusta at the start of the 2022 season. Conley batted .246 with 10 home runs, 40 RBIs, 62 runs scored, and 23 stolen bases in 75 games with the GreenJackets before being promoted to the High-A Rome Braves.

He played in the 2022 Arizona Fall League, where he batted .288/.409/.521, and tied for the league lead in triples (3).
