= Patrick Monteverde =

American baseball player (born 1997)

Free agent
- Pitcher
- Born: September 24, 1997 (age 29); Pittsburgh, Pennsylvania, U.S.
- Bats: Right Throws: Left

MLB debut
- April 19, 2025, for the Miami Marlins

MLB statistics (through 2026 season)
- Win–loss record: 0–0
- Earned run average: 9.39
- Strikeouts: 6
- Stats at Baseball Reference

Teams
- Miami Marlins (2025–2026)

Patrick Dillon Monteverde (born September 24, 1997) is an American professional baseball pitcher who is a free agent. He made his Major League Baseball (MLB) debut in 2026.

== Career ==
Monteverde attended Fox Chapel Area High School in Pittsburgh, Pennsylvania, and played college baseball at Virginia Wesleyan University, Seton Hill University and Texas Tech University. He was drafted by the Miami Marlins in the eighth round of the 2021 MLB draft.

Monteverde made his professional debut with the Florida Complex League Marlins. He pitched 2022 with the Beloit Sky Carp and Pensacola Blue Wahoos and started 2023 with Pensacola.

Monteverde was assigned to the Triple-A Jacksonville Jumbo Shrimp to begin the 2025 season. On April 19, 2025, Monteverde was selected to the 40-man roster and promoted to the major leagues for the first time. He made his MLB debut that day against the Philadelphia Phillies, allowing four runs on nine hits with four strikeouts over 3 2/3 innings. Monteverde was designated for assignment by Miami the next day, following the promotions of Cade Gibson and Ronny Simon. He cleared waivers and was sent outright to Triple-A Jacksonville on April 23. In 25 total appearances (including 15 starts) for the Jumbo Shrimp, Monteverde compiled a 6–5 record and 4.66 ERA with 85 strikeouts across 94 2/3 innings pitched.

Monteverde returned to Jacksonville to begin the 2026 season, recording a 3–2 record and 5.84 ERA with 66 strikeouts across 25 games (including 18 starts). On August 26, 2026, the Marlins selected Monteverde's contract, adding him to their active roster. In his only appearance for Miami two days later, Monteverde allowed four runs across four innings pitched against the Washington Nationals. On November 2, he was removed from the 40–man roster and elected free agency.
