= 2021 NCAA Division I baseball tournament – Super Regionals =

College baseball tournament

- June 11–14, 2021
- Arkansas Razorbacks 1–2 NC State Wolfpack
- Texas Tech Red Raiders 0–2 Stanford Cardinal
- Arizona Wildcats 2–1 Ole Miss Rebels
- Vanderbilt Commodores 2–0 East Carolina Pirates
- Texas Longhorns 2–0 South Florida Bulls
- Mississippi State Bulldogs 2–1 Notre Dame Fighting Irish
- Dallas Baptist Patriots 1–2 Virginia Cavaliers
- Tennessee Volunteers 2–0 LSU Tigers
- ← 2020 Super Regionals 2022 →

The Super Regional round of the 2021 NCAA Division I baseball tournament were eight best-of-three-games series to determine the participating teams of the 2021 College World Series. These matchups were:

- (1) Arkansas Razorbacks (Fayetteville Regional winner) vs. NC State Wolfpack (Ruston Regional winner): NC State wins series 2–1.
- (8) Texas Tech Red Raiders (Lubbock Regional winner) vs. (9) Stanford Cardinal (Stanford Regional winner): Stanford wins series 2–0.
- (5) Arizona Wildcats (Tucson Regional winner) vs. (12) Ole Miss Rebels (Oxford Regional winner): Arizona wins series 2–1.
- (4) Vanderbilt Commodores (Nashville Regional winner) vs. (13) East Carolina Pirates (Greenville Regional winner): Vanderbilt wins series 2–0.
- (2) Texas Longhorns (Austin Regional winner) vs. South Florida Bulls (Gainesville Regional winner): Texas wins series 2–0.
- (7) Mississippi State Bulldogs (Starkville Regional winner) vs. (10) Notre Dame Fighting Irish (South Bend Regional winner): Mississippi State wins series 2–1.
- Dallas Baptist Patriots (Fort Worth Regional winner) vs. Virginia Cavaliers (Columbia Regional winner): Virginia wins series 2–1.
- (3) Tennessee Volunteers (Knoxville Regional winner) vs. LSU Tigers (Eugene Regional winner): Tennessee wins series 2–0.

The higher seeded team of each series hosted all three games. The higher seed team was designated as the home team in Games 1 and (if necessary) 3, while the lower seeded team was the designated home team in game 2. The only exception this year was the series between Dallas Baptist and Virginia, which was held at Founders Park in Columbia, South Carolina.

== Summary ==
=== Fayetteville – Arkansas Razorbacks vs. NC State Wolfpack ===
NC State won the series, 2–1.

Game	Date	Score	Location	Time	Attendance
1	June 11	NC State Wolfpack – 2, Arkansas Razorbacks – 21	Baum–Walker Stadium	3:31	11,084
2	June 12	Arkansas Razorbacks – 5, NC State Wolfpack – 6	Baum–Walker Stadium	2:53	11,084
3	June 13	NC State Wolfpack – 3, Arkansas Razorbacks – 2	Baum–Walker Stadium	2:43	11,084

=== Lubbock – Texas Tech Red Raiders vs. Stanford Cardinal ===
Stanford won the series, 2–0.

Game	Date	Score	Location	Time	Attendance
1	June 11	Stanford Cardinal – 15, Texas Tech Red Raiders – 3	Dan Law Field at Rip Griffin Park	3:09	4,723
2	June 12	Texas Tech Red Raiders – 0, Stanford Cardinal – 9	Dan Law Field at Rip Griffin Park	2:51	4,732

=== Tucson – Arizona Wildcats vs. Ole Miss Rebels ===
Arizona won the series, 2–1.

Game	Date	Score	Location	Time	Attendance
1	June 11	Ole Miss Rebels – 3, Arizona Wildcats – 9	Hi Corbett Field	3:26	5,839
2	June 12	Arizona Wildcats – 3, Ole Miss Rebels – 12	Hi Corbett Field	4:02	7,450
3	June 13	Ole Miss Rebels – 3, Arizona Wildcats – 16	Hi Corbett Field	3:39	5,139

=== Nashville – Vanderbilt Commodores vs. East Carolina Pirates ===
Vanderbilt won the series, 2–0.

Game	Date	Score	Location	Time	Attendance
1	June 11	East Carolina Pirates – 0, Vanderbilt Commodores – 2	Hawkins Field	2:50	3,510
2	June 12	Vanderbilt Commodores – 4, East Carolina Pirates – 1	Hawkins Field	2:44	3,573

=== Austin – Texas Longhorns vs. South Florida Bulls ===
Texas won the series, 2–0.

Game	Date	Score	Location	Time	Attendance
1	June 12	South Florida Bulls – 3, Texas Longhorns – 4	UFCU Disch–Falk Field	2:48	7,180
2	June 13	Texas Longhorns – 12, South Florida Bulls – 4	UFCU Disch–Falk Field	3:28	7,267

=== Starkville – Mississippi State Bulldogs vs. Notre Dame Fighting Irish ===
Mississippi State won the series, 2–1.

Game	Date	Score	Location	Time	Attendance
1	June 12	Notre Dame Fighting Irish – 8, Mississippi State Bulldogs – 9	Dudy Noble Field, Polk–DeMent Stadium	3:17	14,385
2	June 13	Mississippi State Bulldogs – 1, Notre Dame Fighting Irish – 9	Dudy Noble Field, Polk–DeMent Stadium	2:43	13,971
3	June 14	Notre Dame Fighting Irish – 7, Mississippi State Bulldogs – 11	Dudy Noble Field, Polk–DeMent Stadium	3:09	11,754

=== Columbia – Dallas Baptist Patriots vs. Virginia Cavaliers ===
Virginia won the series, 2–1.

Game	Date	Score	Location	Time	Attendance
1	June 12	Virginia Cavaliers – 5, Dallas Baptist Patriots – 6	Founders Park	3:18	1,566
2	June 13	Dallas Baptist Patriots – 0, Virginia Cavaliers – 4	Founders Park	3:19	1,646
3	June 14	Dallas Baptist Patriots – 2, Virginia Cavaliers – 5	Founders Park	3:06	1,207

=== Knoxville – Tennessee Volunteers vs. LSU Tigers ===
Tennessee won the series, 2–0.

Game	Date	Score	Location	Time	Attendance
1	June 12	LSU Tigers – 2, Tennessee Volunteers – 4	Lindsey Nelson Stadium	3:35	4,400
2	June 13	Tennessee Volunteers – 15, LSU Tigers – 6	Lindsey Nelson Stadium	3:06	4,427

== Fayetteville – Arkansas vs. NC State ==
=== Game 1 ===
Friday, June 11 5:07 p.m. (CDT) at Baum–Walker Stadium in Fayetteville, Arkansas
Team	1	2	3	4	5	6	7	8	9	R	H	E
NC State	0	1	0	0	0	0	0	0	1	2	7	0
Arkansas	0	3	4	0	3	6	0	5	X	21	17	0
WP: Patrick Wicklander (7–1) LP: Reid Johnston (8–3); Home runs: NCST: Jose Torres (1); ARK: Charlie Welch (1), Robert Moore 2 (2), Cullen Smith (1); Attendance: 11,084; Boxscore

Patrick Wicklander got the start for Arkansas. He went six innings while striking out six batters. NC State's starter, Reid Johnston struggled allowing seven runs in three innings. Jose Torres opened the scoring for NC State with a solo home-run in the top of the second inning, but Arkansas responded with a three-run inning thanks to Robert Moore's two-run home-run. Cullen Smith opened the flood gates with a grand slam the following inning. Arkansas added six in the sixth inning and five in the eighth inning. NC State tacked on a run in the ninth, but ultimately fell 21–2 in game 1.

=== Game 2 ===
Saturday, June 12 2:07 p.m. (CDT) at Baum–Walker Stadium in Fayetteville, Arkansas
Team	1	2	3	4	5	6	7	8	9	R	H	E
Arkansas	0	2	0	0	0	0	3	0	0	5	4	0
NC State	0	0	1	4	0	1	0	0	X	6	8	1
WP: Sam Highfill (8–2) LP: Ryan Costieu (8–3) Sv: Evan Justice (11); Home runs: ARK: Brady Slavens (1), Charlie Welch (2); NCST: Jose Torres (2), Luca Tresh (1), Vojtech Mensik (1); Attendance: 11,084; Boxscore

NC State sent Sam Highfill to the mound in a possible elimination game to go up against Lael Lockhart. Arkansas took an early lead on a two-run home run from Charlie Welch. However, NC State got homers from Jose Torres, Luca Tresh, and Vojtech Mensik in the fourth inning to take a 5–2 lead. NC State added one more in the sixth. A home run from Brady Slavens, a throwing error, and an RBI single from Jalen Battles cut the lead to 1. Evan Justice came in to close the door on Arkansas in game 2.

=== Game 3 ===
Sunday, June 13 5:06 p.m. (CDT) at Baum–Walker Stadium in Fayetteville, Arkansas
Team	1	2	3	4	5	6	7	8	9	R	H	E
NC State	0	0	2	0	0	0	0	0	1	3	8	1
Arkansas	0	1	0	0	0	0	1	0	0	2	4	0
WP: Evan Justice (5–2) LP: Kevin Kopps (12–1); Home runs: NCST: Jonny Butler (1), Jose Torres (3); ARK: Cayden Wallace (1); Attendance: 11,084; Boxscore

Arkansas ace Kevin Kopps suffered his first loss of the season after allowing a solo home run in the top of the ninth to Jose Torres, his third of the series. NC State will advance to the 2021 College World Series after upsetting No. 1 Arkansas. This marks their first College World Series appearance since 2013. Arkansas had not lost a three-game series since May 2019.

=== Composite line score ===
2021 Fayetteville Super Regional (2–1): NC State Wolfpack defeated Arkansas Razorbacks.

Team	1	2	3	4	5	6	7	8	9	R	H	E
NC State Wolfpack	0	0	3	4	0	1	0	0	2	11	23	2
Arkansas Razorbacks	0	6	4	0	3	6	4	5	0	28	25	0
Total attendance: 33,252 Average attendance: 11,084

== Lubbock – Texas Tech vs. Stanford ==
Texas Tech and Stanford previously met in the 1995 Midwest I Regional. They played 3 times. Texas Tech won the first matchup 3–1. Stanford won both games in the Regional Final 3–2 and 6–5.

=== Game 1 ===
Friday, June 11 2:06 p.m. (CDT) at Dan Law Field at Rip Griffin Park in Lubbock, Texas
Team	1	2	3	4	5	6	7	8	9	R	H	E
Stanford	4	0	0	0	0	2	5	3	1	15	14	0
Texas Tech	0	0	0	1	0	1	0	0	1	3	7	3
WP: Brendan Beck (9–1) LP: Chase Hampton (4–1); Home runs: STAN: Tim Tawa (1), Nick Brueser (1), Drew Bowser (1); TTU: Cole Stilwell (1), Nate Rombach (1); Attendance: 4,732; Boxscore

Brendan Beck threw a career-high 13 strikeouts in 7.1 IP for the Cardinal. Texas Tech's starter Chase Hampton did not experience the same success, as he allowed four runs in 3.2 innings. Stanford's four-run first inning started because of Tim Tawa's home run. The Stanford offense was all over the Tech bullpen, as they won Game 1 by a score of 15–3.

=== Game 2 ===
Saturday, June 12 2:06 p.m. (CDT) at Dan Law Field at Rip Griffin Park in Lubbock, Texas
Team	1	2	3	4	5	6	7	8	9	R	H	E
Texas Tech	0	0	0	0	0	0	0	0	0	0	2	2
Stanford	1	2	0	0	1	4	0	1	X	9	11	0
WP: Alex Williams (4–2) LP: Patrick Montverde (7–4); Home runs: TTU: None; STAN: Brock Jones 3 (3), Tommy Troy (1); Attendance: 4,732; Boxscore

Stanford turned to junior right-handed pitcher, Alex Williams, for a chance to advance to the 2021 College World Series. Williams was excellent allowing two hits and no runs in his start. The Stanford offense was led by Brock Jones via the home run as he hit three on the day. Stanford sweeps Texas Tech to advance to the College World Series for the first time since 2008.

=== Composite line score ===
2021 Lubbock Super Regional (2–0): Texas Tech Red Raiders defeated Stanford Cardinal.

Team	1	2	3	4	5	6	7	8	9	R	H	E
Stanford Cardinal	5	2	0	0	1	6	5	4	1	26	25	0
Texas Tech Red Raiders	0	0	0	1	0	1	0	0	1	3	9	5
Total attendance: 9,464 Average attendance: 4,732

== Tucson – Arizona vs. Ole Miss ==
Arizona and Ole Miss have met just once in NCAA tournament competition. It came in the 1956 College World Series, which saw Arizona take a 7–3 win to eliminate Ole Miss.

=== Game 1 ===
Friday, June 11 6:06 p.m. (MST) at Hi Corbett Field in Tucson, Arizona
Team	1	2	3	4	5	6	7	8	9	R	H	E
Ole Miss	3	0	0	0	0	0	0	0	0	3	6	0
Arizona	1	1	0	1	2	1	0	3	X	9	13	0
WP: Riley Cooper (3–0) LP: Derek Diamond (3–5); Home runs: MISS: None; ARIZ: Donta Williams (1), Jacob Berry (1), Tony Bullard 2 (2); Attendance: 5,839; Boxscore

=== Game 2 ===
Saturday, June 12 7:00 p.m. (MST) at Hi Corbett Field in Tucson, Arizona
Team	1	2	3	4	5	6	7	8	9	R	H	E
Arizona	0	0	0	2	0	0	1	0	0	3	10	1
Ole Miss	1	6	0	3	2	0	0	0	X	12	16	0
WP: Doug Nikhazy (12–2) LP: Garrett Irvin (6–3) Sv: Austin Miller (1); Home runs: ARIZ: Donta Williams (2); MISS: Jacob Gonzalez (1), Peyton Chatagnier (1); Attendance: 7,450; Boxscore

=== Game 3 ===
Sunday, June 13 6:00 p.m. (MST) at Hi Corbett Field in Tucson, Arizona
Team	1	2	3	4	5	6	7	8	9	R	H	E
Ole Miss	0	0	1	0	0	0	0	1	1	3	5	0
Arizona	1	0	2	7	3	0	2	1	X	16	20	0
WP: TJ Nichols (6–3) LP: Taylor Broadway (4–3); Home runs: MISS: Jacob Gonzalez (2); ARIZ: Jacob Berry (2), Ryan Holgate (1); Attendance: 5,139; Boxscore

=== Composite line score ===
2021 Tucson Super Regional (2–1): Arizona Wildcats defeated Ole Miss Rebels.

Team	1	2	3	4	5	6	7	8	9	R	H	E
Ole Miss Rebels	4	6	1	3	2	0	0	1	1	18	27	0
Arizona Wildcats	2	1	2	10	5	1	2	4	0	28	43	1
Total attendance: 18,428 Average attendance: 6,143

== Nashville – Vanderbilt vs. East Carolina ==
Vanderbilt and East Carolina have met only once at the 1974 NCAA Division I baseball tournament.

=== Game 1 ===
Friday, June 11 11:06 a.m. (CDT) at Hawkins Field in Nashville, Tennessee
Team	1	2	3	4	5	6	7	8	9	R	H	E
East Carolina	0	0	0	0	0	0	0	0	0	0	3	0
Vanderbilt	0	1	0	0	0	0	0	1	X	2	7	0
WP: Kumar Rocker (13–3) LP: Gavin Williams (10–1) Sv: Luke Murphy (8); Attendance: 3,510; Boxscore

=== Game 2 ===
Saturday, June 12 11:06 a.m. (MST) at Hawkins Field in Nashville, Tennessee
Team	1	2	3	4	5	6	7	8	9	R	H	E
Vanderbilt	0	0	0	0	2	0	0	0	2	4	5	0
East Carolina	0	0	0	0	0	0	1	0	0	1	2	0
WP: Jack Leiter (10–3) LP: Carson Whisenhunt (6–2) Sv: Nick Maldonado (8); Home runs: VAN: None; ECU: Josh Moylan (1); Attendance: 3,573; Boxscore

=== Composite line score ===
2021 Nashville Super Regional (2–0): Vanderbilt Commodores defeated East Carolina Pirates.

Team	1	2	3	4	5	6	7	8	9	R	H	E
East Carolina Pirates	0	0	0	0	0	0	1	0	0	1	5	0
Vanderbilt Commodores	0	1	0	0	2	0	0	1	2	6	12	0
Total attendance: 7,083 Average attendance: 3,542

== Austin – Texas vs. South Florida ==
This was the first time that Texas and South Florida have played in baseball.

=== Game 1 ===
Saturday, June 12 8:06 p.m. (CDT) at UFCU Disch–Falk Field in Austin, Texas (ESPNU)
Team	1	2	3	4	5	6	7	8	9	R	H	E
South Florida	0	0	0	0	0	0	0	0	3	3	6	2
Texas	1	1	0	0	0	0	1	0	1	4	6	0
WP: Tanner Witt (4–0) LP: Brad Lord (3–5); Home runs: USF: Daniel Cantu (1), Drew Brutcher (1); TEX: None; Attendance: 7,180; Boxscore

Ty Madden, the starting pitcher for Texas, went 6 2/3 scoreless innings. Jack Jasiak started on the mound for South Florida in their first-ever Super Regional game. Texas held their early lead until the top of the 9th, when Daniel Cantu and Drew Butcher launched home runs to even the game at 3. A two-out fielding error by South Florida in the bottom of the ninth put the winning run on first base. The next batter, Eric Kennedy, hit a double to centerfield to secure a walk-off win for the Longhorns.

=== Game 2 ===
Sunday, June 13 8:05 p.m. (CDT) at UFCU Disch–Falk Field in Austin, Texas (ESPNU)
Team	1	2	3	4	5	6	7	8	9	R	H	E
Texas	0	4	2	0	2	0	3	0	1	12	10	0
South Florida	2	0	0	1	0	1	0	0	0	4	8	0
WP: Tristan Stevens (11–3) LP: Collin Sullivan (3–4); Home runs: TEX: Cam Williams (1); USF: None; Attendance: 7,267; Boxscore

Facing elimination, South Florida turned to Collin Sullivan, who only lasted 1.2 innings. Texas's Tristan Stevens picked up the win going 5.2 innings. South Florida struck first with two runs in the bottom of the first. Texas responded with four runs in the second and two more in the third. The Texas offense would continue to pile on as they won 12–4. Texas will advance to the 2021 College World Series, making their 37th appearance.

=== Composite line score ===
2021 Austin Super Regional (2–0): Texas Longhorns defeated South Florida.

Team	1	2	3	4	5	6	7	8	9	R	H	E
South Florida Bulls	2	0	0	1	0	1	0	0	3	7	14	2
Texas Longhorns	1	5	2	0	2	0	4	0	2	16	16	0
Total attendance: 14,447 Average attendance: 7,224

== Starkville – Mississippi State vs. Notre Dame ==
Mississippi State and Notre Dame previously met in the 1993 East Regional and 2000 Starkville Regional. in 1993, Notre Dame won 15–1, while the 2000 Starkville Regional saw the teams matchup three times. Mississippi State won the first matchup 8–1. However, Notre Dame stormed back to the Regional Final and won 7–0, but fell in the ensuing game 10–9, as Mississippi State advanced to the Super Regionals.

=== Game 1 ===
Saturday, June 12 1:06 p.m. (CDT) at Dudy Noble Field, Polk–DeMent Stadium in Starkville, Mississippi
Team	1	2	3	4	5	6	7	8	9	R	H	E
Notre Dame	1	1	1	1	3	0	1	0	0	8	12	4
Mississippi State	1	0	2	0	3	2	1	0	X	9	10	1
WP: Preston Johnston (3–0) LP: Tanner Kohlhepp (7–2) Sv: Landon Sims (10); Home runs: ND: Brooks Coetzee (1), Zack Prajzner (1); MSSU: Rowdey Jordan (1), Tanner Allen (1), Logan Tanner (1); Attendance: 14,385; Boxscore

The crowd of 14,385 is the largest Super Regional crowd in NCAA tournament history.

=== Game 2 ===
Sunday, June 13 5:05 p.m. (CDT) at Dudy Noble Field, Polk–DeMent Stadium in Starkville, Mississippi
Team	1	2	3	4	5	6	7	8	9	R	H	E
Mississippi State	1	0	0	0	0	0	0	0	0	1	5	2
Notre Dame	2	0	0	4	0	2	1	0	X	9	8	1
WP: Aidan Tyrell (5–1) LP: Christian MacLeod (6–5); Home runs: MSSU: None; ND: Jack Brannigan (1), David LaManna (1); Attendance: 13,971; Boxscore

=== Game 3 ===
Monday, June 14 6:06 p.m. (CDT) at Dudy Noble Field, Polk–DeMent Stadium in Starkville, Mississippi
Team	1	2	3	4	5	6	7	8	9	R	H	E
Notre Dame	1	0	1	0	3	0	2	0	0	7	10	1
Mississippi State	1	6	1	2	1	0	0	0	X	11	12	1
WP: Landon Sims (4–0) LP: Will Mercer (4–3); Home runs: ND: Ryan Cole (1), Niko Kavadas (1); MSSU: Tanner Allen (1), Logan Tanner (1); Attendance: 11,754; Boxscore

=== Composite line score ===
2021 Starkville Super Regional (2–1): Mississippi State Bulldogs defeated Notre Dame Fighting Irish.

Team	1	2	3	4	5	6	7	8	9	R	H	E
Notre Dame Fighting Irish	4	1	2	5	6	2	4	0	0	24	30	6
Mississippi State Bulldogs	3	6	3	2	4	2	1	0	0	21	27	4
Total attendance: 40,110 Average attendance: 13,370

== Columbia – Dallas Baptist vs. Virginia ==
=== Game 1 ===
Saturday, June 12 12:07 p.m. (EDT) at Founders Park in Columbia, South Carolina
Team	1	2	3	4	5	6	7	8	9	R	H	E
Virginia	0	0	0	0	5	0	0	0	0	5	7	0
Dallas Baptist	2	0	0	0	1	2	1	0	X	6	12	0
WP: Ray Gaither (3–2) LP: Zach Messinger (3–2) Sv: Zane Russell (2); Home runs: UVA: Alez Tappen (1), Jake Gelof (1), DBU: Jackson Glenn (1), Andrew Benefield (1), Andres Sosa (1); Attendance: 1,566; Boxscore

=== Game 2 ===
Sunday, June 13 12:06 p.m (EDT) at Founders Park in Columbia, South Carolina
Team	1	2	3	4	5	6	7	8	9	R	H	E
Dallas Baptist	0	0	0	0	0	0	0	0	0	0	4	2
Virginia	0	0	0	0	0	0	0	4	X	4	7	2
WP: Brandon Neeck (2–0) LP: Rhett Kouba (6–2); Attendance: 1,646; Boxscore

=== Game 3 ===
Monday, June 14 12:06 p.m. (EDT) at Founders Park in Columbia, South Carolina
Team	1	2	3	4	5	6	7	8	9	R	H	E
Dallas Baptist	0	0	2	0	0	0	0	0	0	2	7	1
Virginia	0	0	0	1	0	0	4	0	X	5	8	0
WP: M. Wyatt (4–1) LP: Ray Gaither (3–3); Home runs: DBU: Jackson Glenn (2); UVA: Kyle Teel (1), Nic Kent (1); Attendance: 1,207; Boxscore

=== Composite line score ===
2021 Columbia Super Regional (2–1): Virginia Cavaliers defeated Dallas Baptist Patriots.

Team	1	2	3	4	5	6	7	8	9	R	H	E
Virginia Cavaliers	0	0	0	1	5	0	4	4	0	19	22	2
Dallas Baptist Patriots	2	0	2	0	1	2	1	0	0	8	23	3
Total attendance: 4,419 Average attendance: 1,473

== Knoxville – Tennessee vs. LSU ==
=== Game 1 ===
Saturday, June 12 7:06 p.m. (EDT) at Lindsey Nelson Stadium in Knoxville, Tennessee
Team	1	2	3	4	5	6	7	8	9	R	H	E
LSU	0	1	0	0	1	0	0	0	0	2	8	0
Tennessee	0	0	1	0	0	3	0	0	X	4	6	1
WP: Chad Dallas (11–1) LP: Javen Coleman (3–2) Sv: Sean Hunley (9); Home runs: LSU: Cade Doughty (1); TENN: None; Attendance: 4,400; Boxscore

=== Game 2 ===
Sunday, June 13 3:06 p.m. (EDT) at Lindsey Nelson Stadium in Knoxville, Tennessee
Team	1	2	3	4	5	6	7	8	9	R	H	E
Tennessee	2	0	1	2	6	0	0	2	2	15	12	0
LSU	1	0	1	0	0	2	2	0	0	6	8	3
WP: Blade Tidwell (10–3) LP: Landon Marceaux (7–7); Home runs: TENN: Jake Rucker 2 (2), Drew Gilbert (1), Evan Russell (1), Jordan Beck (1), Connor Pavolony (1); LSU: Dylan Crews 2 (2), Tre' Morgan (1), Brody Drost (1); Attendance: 4,427; Boxscore

=== Composite line score ===
2021 Knoxville Super Regional (2–0): Tennessee Volunteers defeated LSU Tigers.

Team	1	2	3	4	5	6	7	8	9	R	H	E
LSU Tigers	1	1	1	0	1	2	2	0	0	8	16	0
Tennessee Volunteers	2	0	2	2	6	3	0	2	2	19	18	0
Total attendance: 8,827 Average attendance: 4,414
