= Southeastern Conference Baseball Pitcher of the Year =

Southeastern Conference Pitcher of the Year
- Awarded for: the most outstanding baseball pitcher in the Southeastern Conference
- Country: United States
- First award: 2003–present
- Currently held by: Liam Doyle, Tennessee

The Southeastern Conference Pitcher of the Year is a baseball award given to the Southeastern Conference's most outstanding pitcher. The award was first given following the 2003 season. It is selected by the league's head coaches, who are not allowed to vote for their own players.

== Key ==
*	Awarded a national Player of the Year award: the Dick Howser Trophy or the Golden Spikes Award
Pitcher (X)	Denotes the number of times the Pitcher had been awarded the Pitcher of the Year award at that point

== Winners ==
Season	Pitcher	School	Reference
2003	David Marchbanks	South Carolina	
2004	Justin Hoyman	Florida	
2005	Luke Hochevar	Tennessee	
2006	Nick Schmidt	Arkansas	
2007	David Price	Vanderbilt	
2008	Joshua Fields	Georgia	
2009	Louis Coleman	LSU	
2010	Drew Pomeranz	Ole Miss	
2011	Grayson Garvin	Vanderbilt	
2012	Chris Stratton	Mississippi State	
2013	Aaron Nola	LSU	
2014	Aaron Nola (2)	LSU	
2015	Carson Fulmer	Vanderbilt	
2016	Logan Shore	Florida	
2017	Sean Hjelle	Kentucky	
2018	Brady Singer	Florida	
2019	Ethan Small	Mississippi State	
2021	Kevin Kopps	Arkansas	
2022	Chase Dollander	Tennessee	
2023	Paul Skenes*	LSU	
2024	Hagen Smith	Arkansas	
2025	Liam Doyle	Tennessee	
2026	Aidan King	Florida	

== Winners by school ==
School (year joined)	Winners	Years
LSU (1932)	4	2009, 2013, 2014, 2023
Vanderbilt (1932)	3	2007, 2011, 2015
Arkansas (1991)	3	2006, 2021, 2024
Florida (1932)	3	2004, 2016, 2026
Mississippi State (1932)	2	2012, 2019
Tennessee (1932)	3	2005, 2022, 2025
Georgia (1932)	1	2008
Kentucky (1932)	1	2017
Ole Miss (1932)	1	2009
South Carolina (1991)	1	2003
Alabama (1932)	0	—
Auburn (1932)	0	—
Missouri (2012)	0	—
Texas A&M (2012)	0	—
Oklahoma (2024)	0	—
Texas (2024)	0	—
