= 2021 Arkansas Razorbacks baseball team =

American college baseball season

2021 Arkansas Razorbacks baseball
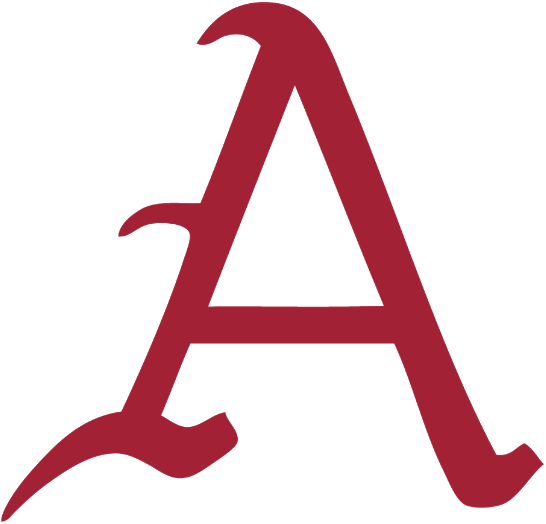

Fayetteville Regional champion SEC tournament champion SEC regular season champion SEC Western Division champion

Fayetteville Super Regional
- Conference: Southeastern Conference
- Western Division

Ranking
- Coaches: No. 1
- CB: No. 1
- Record: 50–13 (22–8 SEC)
- Head coach: Dave Van Horn (19th season)
- Assistant coaches: Nate Thompson; Matt Hobbs
- Captain: Casey Opitz; Christian Franklin; Kevin Kopps; Zebulon Vermillion
- Home stadium: Baum–Walker Stadium (Capacity: 11,129)

2021 Southeastern Conference baseball standings
	Conf.				Overall
Team	W		L	PCT	W		L	PCT
Eastern
No. 6 Tennessee ^{x}‍‍‍^{y}	20	–	10	.667	50	–	18	.735
No. 2 Vanderbilt ‍‍‍^{y}	19	–	10	.655	49	–	18	.731
Florida ‍‍‍^{y}	17	–	13	.567	38	–	22	.633
South Carolina ‍‍‍^{y}	16	–	14	.533	34	–	23	.596
Georgia ‍‍‍	13	–	17	.433	31	–	25	.554
Kentucky ‍‍‍	12	–	18	.400	29	–	23	.558
Missouri ‍‍‍	8	–	22	.267	15	–	36	.294
Western
No. 5 Arkansas ^{x}‍†‍‡‍^{y}	22	–	8	.733	50	–	13	.794
No. 1 Mississippi State ‍‍‍^{y}	20	–	10	.667	50	–	18	.735
No. 13 Ole Miss ‍‍‍^{y}	18	–	12	.600	45	–	22	.672
No. 18 LSU ‍‍‍^{y}	13	–	17	.433	38	–	25	.603
Alabama ‍‍‍^{y}	12	–	17	.414	32	–	26	.552
Auburn ‍‍‍	10	–	20	.333	25	–	27	.481
Texas A&M ‍‍‍	9	–	21	.300	29	–	27	.518
x – Division champion † – Conference champion ‡ – Tournament champion y – Invited to the NCAA tournament As of June 30, 2021; Rankings from D1Baseball

The 2021 Arkansas Razorbacks baseball team (variously the Diamond Hogs or the Omahogs) represents the University of Arkansas in the 2021 NCAA Division I baseball season. The Razorbacks are coached by Dave Van Horn, in his 19th season with the Razorbacks, and play their home games at Baum–Walker Stadium.

== Preseason ==
=== Preseason coaches poll ===
In the preseason coaches poll, Arkansas was predicted to finish in third place in the West Division. Ole Miss received a majority of the votes to win the West Division, with Mississippi State, Arkansas, and LSU all receiving at least one such vote. Florida was the overwhelming favorite to win the East Division, receiving all but one first-place vote, with the last going to Vanderbilt. The Gators were also the favorites to win the SEC as a whole; they received 12 such votes, while Mississippi State and Vanderbilt received one each.

Coaches poll (West Division)
Predicted finish	Team	Votes (1st place)
1	Ole Miss	78 (7)
2	Mississippi State	73 (3)
3	Arkansas	72 (2)
4	LSU	63 (2)
5	Texas A&M	36
6	Auburn	32
7	Alabama	31

Coaches poll (East Division)
Predicted finish	Team	Votes (1st place)
1	Florida	91 (13)
2	Vanderbilt	79 (1)
3	Tennessee	58
4	South Carolina	55
5	Georgia	51
6	Missouri	28
7	Kentucky	23

=== Preseason team selections ===
Multiple Razorbacks were named to preseason All-America teams by several organizations and publications. Baseball America named outfielder Christian Franklin and second baseman Robert Moore to its All-America second team, and College Baseball Nation made the same picks, though listed Moore as a shortstop. D1Baseball, Perfect Game, and NCBWA all named Franklin to their first teams. In addition, four Razorbacks – Moore, Franklin, catcher Casey Opitz, and designated hitter Matt Goodheart – were named to the SEC Baseball Coaches preseason All-Conference first team. Both Franklin and Moore were also named to the Golden Spikes Award preseason watchlist by USA Baseball.

== Roster ==
2021 Arkansas Razorbacks baseball team
Players
Coaches

#	Pos.	Name	B/T	Height	Weight	Year	Previous school	Home town
1	INF	Robert Moore	S/R	5 ft 9 in (1.75 m)	170 lb (77 kg)	So	Shawnee Mission East HS	Leawood, KS
3	INF	Zack Gregory	L/R	5 ft 10 in (1.78 m)	185 lb (84 kg)	RS So	Timber Creek HS	Keller, TX
4	INF	Jalen Battles	R/R	6 ft 2 in (1.88 m)	205 lb (93 kg)	Jr	James Madison HS; McLennan Community College	San Antonio, TX
5	INF	Jacob Nesbit	R/R	6 ft 0 in (1.83 m)	180 lb (82 kg)	RS Jr	Coppell HS	Coppell, TX
7	INF	Cayden Wallace	R/R	6 ft 0 in (1.83 m)	205 lb (93 kg)	Fr	Greenbrier HS	Greenbrier, AR
8	OF	Braydon Webb	R/R	6 ft 0 in (1.83 m)	200 lb (91 kg)	RS Sr	McKinney Boyd HS; Grayson College	McKinney, TX
10	INF	Matt Goodheart	L/R	6 ft 1 in (1.85 m)	185 lb (84 kg)	Sr	Magnolia HS; San Jacinto College	Magnolia, AR
11	C	Cason Tollett	R/R	6 ft 1 in (1.85 m)	210 lb (95 kg)	So	Little Rock Christian Academy	Little Rock, AR
12	C	Casey Opitz (C)	S/R	5 ft 11 in (1.8 m)	200 lb (91 kg)	Sr	Heritage HS	Centennial, CO
13	RHP	Connor Noland	R/R	6 ft 2 in (1.88 m)	220 lb (100 kg)	Jr	Greenwood HS	Greenwood, AR
14	INF	Cullen Smith	L/R	6 ft 0 in (1.83 m)	185 lb (84 kg)	RS Sr	Wilson Central HS; East Tennessee State University	Nashville, TN
15	C	Dylan Leach	S/R	5 ft 11 in (1.8 m)	195 lb (88 kg)	Fr	Carthage HS	Carthage, TX
16	INF	Zac White	R/R	6 ft 0 in (1.83 m)	180 lb (82 kg)	Fr	Joe T. Robinson HS	Little Rock, AR
17	INF	Brady Slavens	L/R	6 ft 3 in (1.91 m)	195 lb (88 kg)	Jr	Olathe Northwest HS; Wichita State University; Johnson County Community College	Olathe, KS
18	LHP	Lael Lockhart	S/L	6 ft 3 in (1.91 m)	220 lb (100 kg)	Gr	Friendswood HS; University of Houston	Friendswood, TX
19	C	Charlie Welch	R/R	6 ft 0 in (1.83 m)	205 lb (93 kg)	Jr	Thomas Jefferson HS; St. Johns River State College	St. Petersburg, FL
20	RHP	Elijah Trest	L/R	6 ft 3 in (1.91 m)	220 lb (100 kg)	Jr	White Oak HS	White Oak, TX
21	RHP	Jacob Burton	R/R	6 ft 0 in (1.83 m)	185 lb (84 kg)	Jr	New Diana HS	Diana, TX
22	RHP	Jaxon Wiggins	R/R	6 ft 6 in (1.98 m)	220 lb (100 kg)	Fr	Roland HS	Roland, OK
25	OF	Christian Franklin (C)	R/R	5 ft 11 in (1.8 m)	195 lb (88 kg)	Jr	Rockhurst HS	Overland Park, KS
26	INF	Ethan Bates	L/R	5 ft 11 in (1.8 m)	175 lb (79 kg)	Fr	Lakeside HS	Hot Springs, AR
27	RHP	Blake Adams	R/R	6 ft 2 in (1.88 m)	215 lb (98 kg)	So	Har-Ber HS	Springdale, AR
28	RHP	Kole Ramage	R/R	6 ft 1 in (1.85 m)	205 lb (93 kg)	Sr	Carroll Senior HS	Southlake, TX
29	RHP	Nate Wohlgemuth	R/R	5 ft 11 in (1.8 m)	210 lb (95 kg)	Fr	Owasso High School	Owasso, OK
31	RHP	Caleb Bolden	R/R	6 ft 2 in (1.88 m)	190 lb (86 kg)	RS Jr	Pleasant Grove HS	Texarkana, TX
32	LHP	Zack Morris	L/L	6 ft 3 in (1.91 m)	220 lb (100 kg)	So	Cabot HS	Cabot, AR
33	LHP	Patrick Wicklander	R/L	6 ft 1 in (1.85 m)	205 lb (93 kg)	Jr	Valley Christian HS	San Jose, CA
34	LHP	Nick Griffin	L/L	6 ft 4 in (1.93 m)	185 lb (84 kg)	Fr	Monticello HS	Monticello, AR
35	RHP	Ryan Costeiu	R/R	6 ft 0 in (1.83 m)	200 lb (91 kg)	Jr	De La Salle HS; Sacramento City College	Clayton, CA
36	RHP	Peyton Pallette	R/R	6 ft 1 in (1.85 m)	175 lb (79 kg)	So	Benton HS	Benton, AR
37	LHP	Caden Monke	L/L	6 ft 3 in (1.91 m)	170 lb (77 kg)	Jr	Mount Olive HS	Mount Olive, IL
38	RHP	Mark Adamiak	R/R	6 ft 4 in (1.93 m)	225 lb (102 kg)	So	Shawnee Mission Northwest HS	Shawnee, KS
39	LHP	Evan Taylor	L/L	6 ft 4 in (1.93 m)	255 lb (116 kg)	Jr	Florence HS	Florence, AL
40	LHP	Corey Spain	L/L	5 ft 11 in (1.8 m)	215 lb (98 kg)	RS Fr	Monett HS	Monett, MO
41	RHP	Will McEntire	L/R	6 ft 4 in (1.93 m)	235 lb (107 kg)	So	Bryant HS	Bryant, AR
43	RHP	Miller Pleimann	R/R	6 ft 4 in (1.93 m)	200 lb (91 kg)	RS So	Fayetteville HS; Wichita State University	Fayetteville, AR
45	RHP	Kevin Kopps (C)	R/R	6 ft 0 in (1.83 m)	200 lb (91 kg)	RS Sr	George Ranch HS	Sugar Land, TX
46	RHP	Tyler Cacciatori	R/R	6 ft 6 in (1.98 m)	235 lb (107 kg)	Fr	Sheridan HS	Sheridan, AR
48	RHP	Heston Tole	R/R	6 ft 6 in (1.98 m)	210 lb (95 kg)	Fr	IMG Academy	Wichita Falls, TX
50	LHP	Matthew Magre	L/L	6 ft 1 in (1.85 m)	205 lb (93 kg)	Fr	Fayetteville HS	Fayetteville, AR
52	RHP	Louis Stallone	R/R	6 ft 9 in (2.06 m)	235 lb (107 kg)	Fr	St. Anthony's HS	Kings Park, NY
55	RHP	Gabriel Starks	R/R	6 ft 1 in (1.85 m)	215 lb (98 kg)	Fr	Watson Chapel HS	Pine Bluff, AR
57	RHP	Nathan Rintz	R/R	6 ft 2 in (1.88 m)	190 lb (86 kg)	RS Fr	Schaumburg HS	Schaumburg, IL
58	RHP	Evan Gray	R/R	6 ft 4 in (1.93 m)	200 lb (91 kg)	RS Fr	Belleville East HS	Swansea, IL
59	RHP	Isaac Bracken	R/R	6 ft 0 in (1.83 m)	195 lb (88 kg)	Gr	Berthoud HS; University of Northern Colorado	Berthoud, CO
88	RHP	Zebulon Vermillion (C)	L/R	6 ft 4 in (1.93 m)	230 lb (104 kg)	Sr	Shawnee Mission East HS	Prairie Village, KS

Head coach

Dave Van Horn
(19th season; Arkansas '88)

Assistant coach(es)

Nate Thompson
(4th season; Dallas Baptist '06)
Bobby Wernes
(1st season; Arkansas '18)

Pitching coach(es)

Matt Hobbs
(3rd season; Missouri '02)

Legend

- (C) Team captain
- (S) Suspended
- (I) Ineligible
- Injured
- Current redshirt

Roster
Last update: May 24, 2021

== Schedule and results ==
Arkansas' schedule was released on January 19, 2021. The Razorbacks began their season in Arlington, Texas, with the State Farm College Baseball Showdown. There, they looked to improve on their results from last year, where Arkansas travelled to Houston to play Oklahoma, Texas, and Baylor, losing all three. After wins against Texas Tech, Texas, and TCU, the Hogs opened their home season with a pair of weekend series sweeps against Southeast Missouri State and Murray State before playing their first true road series at Louisiana Tech. The final game against Louisiana Tech was the team's first loss of the season. They would suffer two more in quick succession, however, dropping a midweek home game to Oklahoma and the first of a home weekend series to Alabama, though they would recover to win the last two and take their SEC-opening series. Several days later, Arkansas finished a six-game home stand with a pair of midweek victories over Memphis.

2021 Arkansas Razorbacks baseball game log
Regular season

February (7–0)
Date	Opponent	Rank	Site/stadium	Score	Win	Loss	Save	TV	Attendance	Overall record	SEC record
State Farm College Baseball Showdown
February 20	vs. No. 3 Texas Tech*	No. 8	Globe Life Field; Arlington, Texas	**W** 13–9	**E. Trest** (1–0)	A. Devine (0–1)		FloBaseball	16,908	1–0	
February 21	vs. No. 9 Texas*	No. 8	Globe Life Field	**W** 4–0	**C. Monke** (1–0)	T. Stevens (0–1)	**C. Bolden** (1)	FloBaseball	17,587	2–0	
February 22	vs. No. 10 TCU*	No. 8	Globe Life Field	**W** 4–1	**R. Costeiu** (1–0)	C. King (0–1)	**K. Kopps** (1)	FloBaseball	13,659	3–0	
February 25	Southeast Missouri State*	No. 2	Baum–Walker Stadium; Fayetteville, Arkansas	**W** 6–5 (10)	**J. Wiggins** (1–0)	B. Cisneros (1–2)		SECN+	4,218	4–0	
February 26	Southeast Missouri State*	No. 2	Baum–Walker Stadium	**W** 7–3	**C. Noland** (1–0)	N. Niznik (0–1)		SECN+	4,218	5–0	
February 27	Southeast Missouri State*	No. 2	Baum–Walker Stadium	**W** 9–3	**P. Pallette** (1–0)	B. Grossius (0–1)		SECN+	4,218	6–0	
February 28	Southeast Missouri State*	No. 2	Baum–Walker Stadium	**W** 11–4 (5)	**K. Kopps** (1–0)	A. Williams (0–1)		SECN+	4,218	7–0	

March (13–3)
Date	Opponent	Rank	Site/stadium	Score	Win	Loss	Save	TV	Attendance	Overall record	SEC record
March 5	Murray State*	No. 1	Baum–Walker Stadium	**W** 7–6	**K. Kopps** (2–0)	A. Whaley (1–1)	**J. Wiggins** (1)	SECN+	4,218	8–0	
March 6	Murray State*	No. 1	Baum–Walker Stadium	**W** 11–6	**B. Adams** (1–0)	S. Gardner (0–2)	**Z. Vermillion** (1)	SECN+	4,218	9–0	
March 7	Murray State*	No. 1	Baum–Walker Stadium	**W** 6–0	**L. Lockhart** (1–0)	J. Wenninger (1–1)		SECN+	4,218	10–0	
March 12	at Louisiana Tech*	No. 1	J. C. Love Field at Pat Patterson Park; Ruston, Louisiana	**W** 9–7 (10)	**K. Kopps** (3–0)	C. Gibson (0–1)	**J. Wiggins** (2)	Cox Sports Television/ESPN+	1,000	11–0	
March 13	at Louisiana Tech*	No. 1	J. C. Love Field at Pat Patterson Park	**W** 8–1	**Z. Vermillion** (1–0)	R. Jennings (1–1)		Cox Sports Television/ESPN+	1,000	12–0	
March 14	at Louisiana Tech*	No. 1	J. C. Love Field at Pat Patterson Park	**L** 0–2	J. Whorff (3–1)	**L. Lockhart** (1–1)		Cox Sports Television/ESPN+	1,000	12–1	
March 16	Oklahoma*	No. 1	Baum–Walker Stadium	**L** 5–8	B. Carmichael (3–0)	**K. Ramage** (0–1)	J. Ruffcorn (1)	SECN	5,735	12–2	
March 19	Alabama	No. 1	Baum–Walker Stadium	**L** 1–16	T. Ras (3–1)	**P. Pallette** (1–1)	C. Shamblin (1)	SECN+	5,735	12–3	0–1
March 20	Alabama	No. 1	Baum–Walker Stadium	**W** 9–1	**Z. Vermillion** (2–0)	D. Smith (0–2)		SECN+	5,735	13–3	1–1
March 21	Alabama	No. 1	Baum–Walker Stadium	**W** 3–1	**K. Kopps** (4–0)	A. Jean (2–1)	**J. Wiggins** (3)	SECN	5,735	14–3	2–1
March 23	Memphis*	No. 2	Baum–Walker Stadium	**W** 14–1	**R. Costeiu** (2–0)	D. Kendrick (0–1)		SECN+	5,735	15–3	
March 24	Memphis*	No. 2	Baum–Walker Stadium	**W** 9–4	**C. Monke** (2–0)	L. Walters (1–1)	**K. Ramage** (1)	SECN+	5,735	16–3	
March 26	at No. 3 Mississippi State	No. 2	Dudy Noble Field, Polk–DeMent Stadium; Starkville, Mississippi	**W** 8–2	**P. Wicklander** (1–0)	C. MacLeod (2–2)	**P. Pallette** (1)	SECN+	6,115	17–3	3–1
March 27	at No. 3 Mississippi State	No. 2	Dudy Noble Field, Polk–DeMent Stadium	**W** 11–5	**C. Monke** (3–0)	B. Smith (3–1)	**K. Kopps** (2)	SECN+	6,152	18–3	4–1
March 28	at No. 3 Mississippi State	No. 2	Dudy Noble Field, Polk–DeMent Stadium	**W** 6–4	**R. Costeiu** (3–0)	J. Fristoe (2–2)	**J. Wiggins** (4)	SECN	4,060	19–3	5–1
March 30	Central Arkansas*	No. 2	Baum–Walker Stadium	**W** 21–8	**K. Ramage** (1–1)	D. Janak (2–3)		SECN+	5,735	20–3	

April (13–4)
Date	Opponent	Rank	Site/stadium	Score	Win	Loss	Save	TV	Attendance	Overall record	SEC record
April 1	Auburn	No. 2	Baum–Walker Stadium	**L** 1–2	C. Greenhill (3–0)	**P. Wicklander** (1–1)	M. Barnett (1)	SECN+	4,692	20–4	5–2
April 2	Auburn	No. 2	Baum–Walker Stadium	**W** 6–5	**J. Wiggins** (2–0)	C. Swilling (1–1)	**K. Kopps** (3)	SECN+	6,585	21–4	6–2
April 3	Auburn	No. 2	Baum–Walker Stadium	**W** 6–5 (10)	**J. Wiggins** (3–0)	T. Bright (2–3)		SECN+	6,585	22–4	7–2
April 6	Little Rock*	No. 2	Baum–Walker Stadium	**W** 7–2	**R. Costeiu** (4–0)	S. Smallwood (0–1)		SECN+	4,225	23–4	
April 7	Little Rock*	No. 2	Baum–Walker Stadium	**W** 10–3	**C. Bolden** (1–0)	C. Evans (1–1)		SECN+	4,002	24–4	
April 10 (DH)	at No. 3 Ole Miss	No. 2	Swayze Field; Oxford, Mississippi	**W** 7–3	**R. Costeiu** (5–0)	T. Myers (2–1)	**K. Kopps** (4)	SECN	11,524	25–4	8–2
April 10 (DH)	at No. 3 Ole Miss	No. 2	Swayze Field	**L** 6–13	D. Nikhazy (3–1)	**P. Pallette** (1–2)	T. Broadway (8)	SECN+	11,857	25–5	8–3
April 11	at No. 3 Ole Miss	No. 2	Swayze Field	**W** 18–14	**K. Kopps** (5–0)	B. Forsyth (0–1)		SECN+	10,042	26–5	9–3
April 13	Arkansas–Pine Bluff*	No. 1	Baum–Walker Stadium	**W** 12–4	**C. Bolden** (2–0)	J. Barker (0–6)		SECN+	4,053	27–5	
April 14	Arkansas–Pine Bluff*	No. 1	Baum–Walker Stadium	**W** 26–1 (7)	**K. Ramage** (2–1)	T. Ferguson (0–2)		SECN+	3,655	28–5	
April 17 (DH)	Texas A&M	No. 1	Baum–Walker Stadium	**W** 13–0	**C. Monke** (4–0)	D. Saenz (5–4)		SECN+	6,585	29–5	10–3
April 17 (DH)	Texas A&M	No. 1	Baum–Walker Stadium	**W** 2–1 (10)	**K. Kopps** (6–0)	C. Jozwiak (1–3)		SECN+	6,585	30–5	11–3
April 18	Texas A&M	No. 1	Baum–Walker Stadium	**L** 10–11	T. Werner (2–0)	**R. Costeiu** (5–1)	C. Jozwiak (5)	SECN+	6,585	30–6	11–4
April 20	Grambling State*	No. 1	Baum–Walker Stadium	Cancelled due to cold temperatures							
April 22	at No. 11 South Carolina	No. 1	Founders Park; Columbia, South Carolina	**W** 6–1	**C. Monke** (5–0)	T. Farr (2–4)	**K. Kopps** (5)	SECN	3,350	31–6	12–4
April 23 (DH)	at No. 11 South Carolina	No. 1	Founders Park	**L** 2–6	A. Peters (4–1)	**C. Monke** (5–1)	B. Kerry (4)	SECN+	2,864	31–7	12–5
April 23 (DH)	at No. 11 South Carolina	No. 1	Founders Park	**W** 5–1	**P. Wicklander** (2–1)	W. Sanders (6–2)		SECN+	3,350	32–7	13–5
April 27	Missouri State*	No. 1	Baum–Walker Stadium	Cancelled due to COVID-19 issues within the Missouri State program							
April 30	at LSU	No. 1	Alex Box Stadium, Skip Bertman Field; Baton Rouge, Louisiana	**W** 7–0	**P. Wicklander** (3–1)	L. Marceaux (4–4)	**K. Kopps** (6)	SECN	6,331	33–7	14–5

May (9–3)
Date	Opponent	Rank	Site/stadium	Score	Win	Loss	Save	TV	Attendance	Overall record	SEC record
May 1 (DH)	at LSU	No. 1	Alex Box Stadium, Skip Bertman Field	**W** 17–10	**R. Costeiu** (6–1)	A. Labas (3–1)		SECN+	5,308	34–7	15–5
May 1 (DH)	at LSU	No. 1	Alex Box Stadium, Skip Bertman Field	**L** 4–5	M. Hilliard (4–0)	**L. Lockhart** (1–2)		SECN+	7,036	34–8	15–6
May 7	Georgia	No. 1	Baum–Walker Stadium	**W** 3–0	**P. Wicklander** (4–1)	L. Sullivan (1–1)	**K. Kopps** (7)	SECN+	7,645	35–8	16–6
May 8	Georgia	No. 1	Baum–Walker Stadium	**L** 3–7	J. Woods (3–0)	**R. Costeiu** (6–2)	B. Harris (3)	SECN	7,645	35–9	16–7
May 9	Georgia	No. 1	Baum–Walker Stadium	**W** 5–3	**K. Kopps** (7–0)	R. Webb (3–4)		SECN+	7,645	36–9	17–7
May 11	Arkansas State*	No. 1	Baum–Walker Stadium	**W** 8–4	**L. Lockhart** (2–2)	T. Jeans (1–3)		SECN+	7,645	37–9	
May 14	at No. 4 Tennessee	No. 1	Lindsey Nelson Stadium; Knoxville, Tennessee	**W** 6–5	**K. Kopps** (8–0)	S. Hunley (7–3)		SECN+	3,476	38–9	18–7
May 15	at No. 4 Tennessee	No. 1	Lindsey Nelson Stadium	**L** 7–8	R. Walsh (4–1)	**J. Wiggins** (3–1)		SECN	3,101	38–10	18–8
May 16	at No. 4 Tennessee	No. 1	Lindsey Nelson Stadium	**W** 3–2	**K. Kopps** (9–0)	B. Tidwell (6–3)		SECN+	3,575	39–10	19–8
May 20	No. 9 Florida	No. 1	Baum–Walker Stadium	**W** 6–1	**P. Wicklander** (5–1)	T. Mace (5–1)	**K. Kopps** (8)	SECN	11,084	40–10	20–8
May 21	No. 9 Florida	No. 1	Baum–Walker Stadium	**W** 4–3	**K. Kopps** (10–0)	J. Leftwich (7–4)		SECN+	11,084	41–10	21–8
May 22	No. 9 Florida	No. 1	Baum–Walker Stadium	**W** 9–3	**Z. Vermillion** (3–0)	F. Aleman (1–4)		SECN+	11,084	42–10	22–8

Postseason

SEC Tournament (4–0)
Date	Opponent	Rank (Seed)	Site/stadium	Score	Win	Loss	Save	TV	Attendance	Overall record	SECT Record
May 26	(8) Georgia	No. 1 (1)	Hoover Metropolitan Stadium; Hoover, Alabama	**W** 11–2	**L. Lockhart** (3–2)	C. Goldstein (1–1)		SECN	7,200	43–10	1–0
May 27	No. 3 (4) Vanderbilt	No. 1 (1)	Hoover Metropolitan Stadium	**W** 6–4	**R. Costeiu** (7–2)	K. Rocker (11–3)	**K. Kopps** (9)	SECN	8,625	44–10	2–0
May 29	No. 12 (5) Ole Miss	No. 1 (1)	Hoover Metropolitan Stadium	**W** 3–2	**H. Tole** (1–0)	J. Kimbrell (5–1)	**C. Noland** (1)	SECN	8,735	45–10	3–0
May 30	No. 4 (2) Tennessee	No. 1 (1)	Hoover Metropolitan Stadium	**W** 7–2	**R. Costeiu** (8–2)	W. Heflin (2–3)	**K. Kopps** (10)	ESPN2	10,176	46–10	4–0

NCAA Fayetteville Regional (3–1)
Date	Opponent	Rank (Seed)	Site/stadium	Score	Win	Loss	Save	TV	Attendance	Overall record	NCAAT record
June 4	(4) NJIT	No. 1 (1)	Baum–Walker Stadium	**W** 13–8	**K. Kopps** (11–0)	T. Stafflinger (5–6)		ESPN3	11,084	47–10	1–0
June 5	No. 19 (2) Nebraska	No. 1 (1)	Baum–Walker Stadium	**W** 5–1	**P. Wicklander** (6–1)	C. Hroch (5–3)	**K. Kopps** (11)	ESPN3	11,084	48–10	2–0
June 6	No. 19 (2) Nebraska	No. 1 (1)	Baum–Walker Stadium	**L** 3–5	S. Schwellenbach (3–1)	**L. Lockhart** (3–3)		ESPN2	11,084	48–11	2–1
June 7	No. 19 (2) Nebraska	No. 1 (1)	Baum–Walker Stadium	**W** 6–2	**K. Kopps** (12–0)	K. Frank (3–1)		ESPN2	11,084	49–11	3–1

NCAA Fayetteville Super Regional (1–1)
Date	Opponent	Rank (Nat'l Seed)	Site/stadium	Score	Win	Loss	Save	TV	Attendance	Overall record	NCAAT record
June 11	No. 16 NC State	No. 1 (1)	Baum–Walker Stadium	**W** 21–2	**P. Wicklander** (7–1)	R. Johnston (8–3)		ESPNU	11,084	50–11	1–0
June 12	No. 16 NC State	No. 1 (1)	Baum–Walker Stadium	**L** 5–6	S. Highfill (8–2)	**R. Costeiu** (8–3)		ESPN2	11,084	50–12	1–1
June 13	No. 16 NC State	No. 1 (1)	Baum–Walker Stadium	**L** 2–3	E. Justice (5–2)	**K. Kopps (12–1)**		ESPN2	11,084	50–13	1–2

*Denotes non–conference game • Schedule source • Rankings based on the teams' current ranking in the D1Baseball poll
**W** Arkansas win • **L** Arkansas loss • Postponement or cancellation • **Bold** denotes Arkansas player

== Regular season ==
=== February ===
==== State Farm College Baseball Showdown ====
State Farm College Baseball Showdown — Linescores

No. 8 Arkansas Razorbacks	vs.	No. 3 Texas Tech Red Raiders

February 20, 2021, 7:00 p.m. (CDT) at Globe Life Park in Arlington, Texas
Team	1	2	3	4	5	6	7	8	9	R	H	E
No. 8 Arkansas	0	0	0	0	1	4	3	0	5	13	11	2
No. 3 Texas Tech	0	0	0	0	5	1	3	0	0	9	9	1
WP: Elijah Trest (1–0) LP: Andrew Devine (0–1); Home runs: TTU – Braxton Fulford (1)

No. 9 Texas Longhorns	vs.	No. 8 Arkansas Razorbacks

February 21, 2021, 7:00 p.m. (CDT) at Globe Life Park in Arlington, Texas
Team	1	2	3	4	5	6	7	8	9	R	H	E
No. 9 Texas	0	0	0	0	0	0	0	0	0	0	2	0
No. 8 Arkansas	0	0	0	1	0	3	0	0	0	4	6	0
WP: Caden Monke (1–0) LP: Tristan Stevens (0–1) Sv: Caleb Bolden (1); Home runs: ARK – Brady Slavens (1)

No. 8 Arkansas Razorbacks	vs.	No. 10 TCU Horned Frogs

February 22, 2021, 6:00 p.m. (CDT) at Globe Life Park in Arlington, Texas
Team	1	2	3	4	5	6	7	8	9	R	H	E
No. 8 Arkansas	0	0	0	0	0	0	0	2	2	4	6	0
No. 10 TCU	0	1	0	0	0	0	0	0	0	1	2	0
WP: Ryan Costeiu (1–0) LP: Charles King (0–1) Sv: Kevin Kopps (1)

The Razorbacks faced a tough weekend to begin their 2021 campaign, as they travelled to Arlington, Texas to compete in the 2021 State Farm College Baseball Showdown. Ranked No. 8 in the preseason D1Baseball, Coaches, and NCBWA polls, No. 14 by Baseball America, and No. 22 by Collegiate Baseball Newspaper, Arkansas started their season with three games in three days, against three top-10 opponents from the state of Texas. The first of these was Texas Tech, ranked No. 3 in the country. This was the 62nd meeting between the two teams; Arkansas entered leading the all-time series, 46–15. Zebulon Vermillion and Patrick Monteverde started on the mound for the Razorbacks and Red Raiders, respectively, and both pitchers carried their teams through four scoreless innings to begin the game. Both teams scored first in their respective halves of the fifth inning; Arkansas took a 1–0 lead on a bases-loaded walk in the top half of the inning, but Texas Tech responded with five runs of their own by way of three singles and a wild pitch in the bottom half to take a 5–1 lead. Arkansas tied the game in the sixth after Jalen Battles' 2 RBI double, a wild pitch, and a Robert Moore sac fly, though Tech pulled one back to enter the seventh inning up by a single run. Both teams put more runs on the board in the seventh: a balk and a wild pitch sent three runs in for the Razorbacks, and a three-run Braxton Fulford home run did the same for the Red Raiders. Neither team scored in the eighth inning, and Arkansas entered the final frame trailing by one. This deficit did not last long; the Razorbacks plated five runs in the ninth, as a Battles single, Moore walk, a wild pitch, and a 2 RBI single by Braydon Webb made the score 13–9 heading into the bottom of the ninth. As he had done in the previous two frames, Arkansas closer Elijah Trest retired the side, this time with two popups and a strikeout, to end the contest. Trest was awarded a win, while Tech reliever Andrew Devine, who allowed four runs on five hits, was awarded the loss. Caden Monke and Kole Ramage also made appearances on the mound for Arkansas, though they did not record an out, and Kevin Kopps and Ryan Costeiu recorded three each. Vermillion, the starter, was credited with four innings pitched, as he was pulled after facing two batters in the fifth inning, and Trest pitched three full innings after entering in relief of Costeiu in the seventh with nobody out.

The Hogs' second game of the tournament matched them with the No. 9 Texas Longhorns. This game was the 89th between the two teams; Texas entered leading the series, 56–32. The Razorbacks started Peyton Pallette on the mound, while Tristan Stevens got the starting nod for the Longhorns. Like Arkansas' first game, this game got off to a slow start, with neither team scoring in the first three innings; both teams were retired in order with the exception of Texas' half of the third inning, where they left three runners on base and recorded the game's first hit but could not score. Texas went down in order in the top of the fourth, and a single by Cullen Smith in the bottom of that inning put the Razorbacks' first hit on the board. Two batters later, Brady Slavens recorded an RBI and Arkansas' first run with a single that sent Smith home. Caden Monke entered in relief of Pallette in the top of the fifth, and Monke himself was pulled in favor of Caleb Bolden at the beginning of the sixth inning. In the bottom of the sixth, following a Robert Moore groundout, the Hogs got two runners on base by way of a six-pitch walk to Christian Franklin and Cullen Smith being hit with a pitch, prompting Texas to pull Stevens in favor of Dawson Merryman. After striking out the first batter he faced, Merryman gave up a three-run home run to Brady Slavens, which increased Arkansas' lead to four. From that point, Texas managed only two baserunners in the last three innings of the game, while Arkansas had six, though no more runs would come across and the score remained 4–0. Caleb Bolden, credited with 4 innings pitched with no hits given up, was awarded the save; Caden Monke got the win and Texas starter Tristan Stevens was handed the loss. While starter Peyton Pallette did not get a decision, he finished with a career-best eight strikeouts, with the Hogs pitching staff combining for fifteen in what was the first shutout of Texas since 1988.

For their final game in Arlington, the Razorbacks faced the No. 10 TCU Horned Frogs for the 67th time in program history; Arkansas entered leading the series, 47–19. Lael Lockhart, a graduate transfer from Houston, made his debut as the Hogs' starter, while Austin Krob started on the mound for TCU. With the exception of the four-pitch walk dealt to TCU's Tommy Sacco, neither offense managed a baserunner in the first inning, and the Hogs recorded a hit but could not score in the top of the second. The Horned Frogs opened the scoring in the bottom half of that inning, as a pair of singles by Brayden Taylor and Luke Boyers allowed Zach Humphreys, who had been hit by a pitch earlier in the inning, to score. After that, neither team managed anything for several innings, and both teams pulled their starters in the fifth inning; Charles King relieved Krob and Evan Taylor relieved Lockhart. With the score still 1–0 in favor of TCU, Jaxon Wiggins made his Razorback debut when he entered the game for Taylor to begin the bottom of the sixth; he retired his first three batters consecutively on strikeouts. The Razorbacks again made a pitching change to begin the seventh inning, sending Ryan Costeiu out, who, like Wiggins, retired the first three batters he faced. After six scoreless innings, Arkansas found the scoreboard in the seventh, as a Christian Franklin triple drove home Jalen Battles to tie the game. Immediately afterwards, King was pulled and Haylen Green was sent to the mound for TCU, though Cullen Smith singled shortly thereafter to drive home the go-ahead run for the Razorbacks. Closer Kevin Kopps entered the game for the bottom of the eighth, setting down the side in order, and a Casey Opitz double and a Harrison Beethe wild pitch allowed the Hogs to plate two more runs in the top of the ninth and take a 4–1 lead into the final half-inning of the game. Despite two walks, Kopps was able to strike out three batters and end the game, earning the Razorbacks a 3–0 start to the season and a sweep in Arlington. Costeiu was awarded the win and Kopps was credited with a save, while Charles King received the loss. Over the course of the weekend, the Razorbacks were not averse to late-game offense; 19 of their 21 runs in the three games combined came in the sixth inning or later.

==== Southeast Missouri State weekend series ====
Southeast Missouri State at No. 2 Arkansas — Linescores

Southeast Missouri State Redhawks	at	No. 2 Arkansas Razorbacks

February 25, 2021, 3:00 p.m. (CDT) at Baum–Walker Stadium in Fayetteville, Arkansas
Team	1	2	3	4	5	6	7	8	9	10	R	H	E
Southeast Missouri State	3	0	0	0	0	0	0	2	0	0	5	9	0
No. 2 Arkansas	0	0	1	1	0	0	0	0	3	1	6	9	0
WP: Jaxon Wiggins (1–0) LP: Kyle Miller (0–1); Home runs: ARK – Christian Franklin (1), Brady Slavens (2)

February 26, 2021, 3:00 p.m. (CDT) at Baum–Walker Stadium in Fayetteville, Arkansas
Team	1	2	3	4	5	6	7	8	9	R	H	E
Southeast Missouri State	0	0	2	0	0	0	1	0	0	3	5	0
No. 2 Arkansas	0	0	2	0	0	4	0	1	X	7	8	0
WP: Connor Noland (1–0) LP: Noah Niznik (0–1); Home runs: ARK – Robert Moore (1), Christian Franklin (2), Cayden Wallace (1), Charlie Welch (1)

February 27, 2021, 11:00 a.m. (CDT) at Baum–Walker Stadium in Fayetteville, Arkansas
Team	1	2	3	4	5	6	7	8	9	R	H	E
Southeast Missouri State	0	0	0	0	0	1	0	1	1	3	6	1
No. 2 Arkansas	4	2	2	1	0	0	0	0	X	9	15	1
WP: Peyton Pallette (1–0) LP: Ryan Vogt (0–1); Home runs: SEMO – Andrew Keck (1); ARK – Christian Franklin (3)

February 28, 2021, 1:00 p.m. (CDT) at Baum–Walker Stadium in Fayetteville, Arkansas
Team	1	2	3	4	5	R	H	E
Southeast Missouri State	0	0	1	2	1	4	4	2
No. 2 Arkansas	0	3	2	6	X	11	12	0
WP: Kevin Kopps (1–0) LP: Austin Williams (0–1); Home runs: SEMO – Austin Blazevic (1); ARK – Matt Goodheart (1), Cayden Wallace (2), Brady Slavens (3)

The Razorbacks opened their 2021 home season at Baum–Walker Stadium in Fayetteville with a four-game weekend series against the Southeast Missouri State Redhawks, who entered with a 2–1 record. These four games would be the 12th–15th in the all-time series, with the Hogs leading 6–5 in previous meetings. The starting pitchers for each team were Dylan Dodd and Caleb Bolden for the Redhawks and Razorbacks, respectively. The game started well for the visitors, as SEMO loaded the bases after the first three batters, and sent home a run after a single by Lincoln Andrews. That prompted a pitching change for the Razorbacks after just four batters, as Patrick Wicklander entered. Inheriting loaded bases, Wicklander forced a fielder's choice that scored the Redhawks' second run, and a steal of home put SEMO up by three after the top of the first. The Hogs, for their part, got two baserunners in their half of the first, but a groundout ended the inning before either could advance past second base. Arkansas scored a run of their own in the bottom of the third when Christian Franklin hit a solo home run to left field, narrowing the deficit to two. Another solo home run in the fourth inning, this time by Brady Slavens, cut the Redhawks' lead to one. Wicklander, having completed 4.1 innings, was pulled in the top of the fifth, with Caden Monke entering and retiring the final two batters of the fifth. Arkansas would leave four runners on base in the fifth and sixth innings combined, and Austin Williams entered to pitch in relief of SEMO starter Dylan Dodd to begin the seventh inning. He would retire three straight Razorback batters, all on groundouts, before the Redhawks scored twice more in the top of the eighth by way of a Danny Wright 2 RBI single. Afterwards, Ryan Costeiu relieved Monke for the Razorbacks and finished the inning; Costeiu himself was replaced by Evan Gray for the ninth inning. Trailing 2–5, Arkansas needed three runs in the final half-inning to avoid a loss in their home opener; a pair of singles set up an RBI for Jalen Battles that brought the game within two. After a pitching change that sent Kyle Miller to the mound, a bases-loaded walk to Franklin and a sac fly from Cullen Smith, tied the game at five. A strikeout followed, sending the game to extras. Closer Jaxon Wiggins was sent to the bump for the Hogs to begin the tenth inning; he retired the first three SEMO batters in order, giving Arkansas an opportunity to win the game in the bottom of the tenth. A double and a walk by Casey Opitz and Cayden Wallace, respectively, prompted a pitching change that brought Blake Cisneros into the game, though he hit his first batter to load the bases. The next batter up, Battles, hit a walk-off single, driving home Opitz to win the game 6–5. Wiggins received the win for the Hogs, while Miller, who allowed the go-ahead run to reach base in the tenth, was handed the loss. With the win, the Razorbacks have now won 27 consecutive home openers in a row, dating back to 1995.

Looking to improve on the previous day's performance, Arkansas started Zebulon Vermillion on the mound, while Southeast Missouri State's Noah Niznik got the start. Like the first game, Southeast Missouri got runners on base early, as the Redhawks left three men on in the first two innings without scoring. On the contrary, the Razorbacks were retired in order in both of the first two innings. Both teams found the scoreboard in their respective halves of the third inning, as SEMO scored two by way of a walk and a pair of singles, while the Razorbacks put up two of their own via a Robert Moore two-run homer. Evan Taylor entered the game to pitch for Arkansas to begin the fourth; he lasted only three batters after two walks and a wild pitch, and was relieved by Connor Noland, who retired the side with a double play. Arkansas went down in order in the bottom of the fourth, as did the Redhawks in the top of the fifth, and, despite Brayden Webb being hit by a pitch and stealing second base shortly thereafter, the Razorbacks were held scoreless in the bottom half of that inning as well. The Hogs got the bats going in the bottom of the sixth inning, as Robert Moore reached on a bunt single and scored after a two-run home run by Cayden Wallace; Arkansas' lead would soon increase to four after a Brady Slavens triple and a Charlie Welch home run, after which SEMO starter Noah Niznik would be pulled in favor of Hunter Ralls. SEMO cut the deficit back to three in the top of the seventh, as Peyton Leeper scored on a Tyler Wilber single. This was undone in the bottom of the eighth, as Christian Franklin homered on just the fourth pitch of the inning, and later that inning the Redhawks would send Joseph Karall to the mound following a single and a hit by pitch. Entering the ninth inning, Arkansas made several positional changes, including the substitution of Kevin Kopps as the new pitcher. Despite allowing a single, Kopps got three outs to end the game and secure Arkansas at least a share of the four-game series with a 7–3 victory. Connor Noland was awarded the win for the Razorbacks, while Niznik was handed the loss. The win gave Arkansas their third straight 5–0 start to a season.

In their third game, the Razorbacks looked to clinch the series, and gave the starting nod to right-hander Peyton Pallette, while Ryan Vogt got the start for Southeast Missouri State. The Arkansas bats got started significantly earlier than in any of the Hogs' previous games this year; the bottom of the first began with a leadoff four-pitch walk, two stolen bases, and a wild pitch that prompted a first inning pitching change, which brought Bryce Grossius to the mound. Grossius, after forcing the second out of the inning on an RBI groundout, issued two additional walks, a single, and a wild pitch, before striking out Matt Gregory to end the inning with a 4–0 score. A 1-2-3 second inning for the Redhawks allowed the Hogs offense to take the field once again, where a leadoff single from Robert Moore was immediately followed by a first-pitch two-run homer by Christian Franklin, his third of the series, bumping the Razorbacks' lead to six. The bottom of the third brought more scoring for Arkansas; following a pitching change that brought Matt Perego to the mound, a Moore RBI single and a wild pitch later in the inning widened the margin to eight. SEMO was retired in order in the fourth, and a Jalen Battles double which scored Cullen Smith put the score at 9–0 heading into the fifth inning. Despite tallying their third hit, SEMO was unable to score, and they brought in their fourth pitcher of the game, Joey Kossine, to start the bottom of the fifth, the first scoreless frame for the Arkansas offense. After tossing five complete innings, Pallette was relieved by Nate Wohlgemuth to begin the top of the sixth, though after two walks, a single, a wild pitch, and a run allowed, he was pulled in favor of Zack Morris, who finished the inning. For the first time in the game, Arkansas was retired in order in the bottom of the sixth, as were the Redhawks in the top of the seventh, with Kole Ramage starting that inning on the mound. Two hits in the seventh for Arkansas proved fruitless, and SEMO managed to cut the deficit to seven with an eighth inning solo home run, off the bat of Andrew Keck. This prompted the Hogs' fourth pitching change of the afternoon, as Matthew Magre was tapped to make his collegiate debut, and, after walking his first batter on four pitches, achieved the final two outs to end the frame. SEMO, for their part, put their fourth pitcher of the night on the mound as well, as Joseph Karall started the eighth, and did not allow a run despite giving up the Hogs' final two hits of the night. In the final inning, Gabriel Starks, also making his first collegiate appearance, came to the mound for Arkansas, and retired the side to end the game, 9–3, and clinch the series for the Razorbacks. Both starters earned their respective decisions; Pallette with the win and Vogt with the loss.

Looking to complete the season-opening series sweep, Arkansas and Southeast Missouri State met for a fourth and final time on Sunday afternoon in Fayetteville. With left-hander Lael Lockhart starting on the mound for Arkansas and right-hander Austin Williams starting on the mound for the Redhawks, the game got underway with three straight outs by both teams. SEMO achieved the game's first hit in the top of the second by way of a Lincoln Andrews single, though a 5-4-3 double play ended the inning one batter later. Arkansas established their offense early yet again, as Cayden Wallace and Brady Slavens hit solo home runs to lead off the bottom of the second and establish a 2–0 lead for the Razorbacks. A Casey Opitz double and a Jalen Battles RBI single several batters later increased the lead to three, and was the end of the afternoon for Williams as Connery O'Donnell came in to relieve him after 1.2 innings. The Redhawks found the scoreboard late in their ensuing inning, as Peyton Leeper's groundout scored Jevon Mason to make it 3–1. In the bottom of the third, Arkansas got runs across on consecutive batters as Cullen Smith's double scored Slavens and an error by O'Donnell allowed Smith to advance to third and score himself, making the score 5–1. SEMO kept up the offense in their half of the fourth inning, as Andrew Keck and Mason got onboard and were driven home by a single from Ty Stauss, which prompted Arkansas's first pitching change of the afternoon, a switch to Caden Monke. Monke's day did not last long though, as he walked his first two batters on 12 pitches combined and was then pulled himself in favor of Kevin Kopps. SEMO replaced their pitcher to start the fourth as well; Hunter Ralls entered and allowed the first five batters of the inning to reach base: Robert Moore on a double, Christian Franklin on an error that scored Moore, Matt Goodheart on a two-run home run, and Wallace and Slavens on doubles. Later in the inning, Arkansas increased the lead further; Bates and Battles plated runs on consecutive RBI base hits, making the score 11–3 in the Razorbacks' favor. A leadoff home run from Austin Blazevic in the top of the fifth inning narrowed the margin to seven, but three consecutive outs to follow kept the score at 11–4. A rain delay in the middle of the fifth led to the game being called then (as the game was official after the conclusion of the top of the fifth), and Arkansas completed the sweep of Southeast Missouri State with Kopps earning the win and Williams receiving the loss.

=== March ===
==== Murray State weekend series ====
Murray State at No. 1 Arkansas — Linescores

Murray State Racers	at	No. 1 Arkansas Razorbacks

March 5, 2021, 6:00 p.m. (CDT) at Baum–Walker Stadium in Fayetteville, Arkansas
Team	1	2	3	4	5	6	7	8	9	R	H	E
Murray State	0	0	1	1	4	0	0	0	0	6	8	0
No. 1 Arkansas	0	0	3	0	0	2	0	2	X	7	8	1
WP: Kevin Kopps (2–0) LP: Alec Whaley (1–1) Sv: Jaxon Wiggins (1); Home runs: MURR – Brock Anderson (3), Trey Woosley (1); ARK – Robert Moore×2 (3)

March 6, 2021, 6:00 p.m. (CDT) at Baum–Walker Stadium in Fayetteville, Arkansas
Team	1	2	3	4	5	6	7	8	9	R	H	E
Murray State	0	4	0	1	0	0	1	0	0	6	11	0
No. 1 Arkansas	0	3	0	3	0	2	1	2	X	11	12	1
WP: Blake Adams (1–0) LP: Sam Gardner (0–2) Sv: Zebulon Vermillion (1); Home runs: MURR – Trey Woosley (2); ARK – Brady Slavens (4), Cullen Smith (1), Zack Gregory (1)

March 7, 2021, 6:00 p.m. (CDT) at Baum–Walker Stadium in Fayetteville, Arkansas
Team	1	2	3	4	5	6	7	8	9	R	H	E
Murray State	0	0	0	0	0	0	0	0	0	0	6	1
No. 1 Arkansas	1	0	0	3	2	0	0	0	X	6	5	0
WP: Lael Lockhart (1–0) LP: Jack Wenninger (1–1); Home runs: ARK – Jacob Nesbit (1)

To begin the month of March, the newly-ranked No. 1 Razorbacks played host to the Murray State Racers in a three-game weekend series. Having met twice before, in a two-game series in 1986, the first game of the series began on the evening of March 5, 2021. Left-hander Shane Burns got the starting nod for the visiting Racers, while right-hander Peyton Pallette started the series for the Razorbacks. Murray State started the game with a 1-2-3 inning on offense, and the Hogs were the first to record a hit with Robert Moore's leadoff single in the bottom of the first. The Hogs got a second baserunner after Christian Franklin was delivered a four-pitch walk, but both of those runners were left stranded when the inning ended. The Racers were the first on the scoreboard, as a double by Ryan Perkins sent Tanner Booth home and established a 1–0 lead for the visitors in the top of the third. The Razorbacks responded in their half of the inning, with two leadoff walks and a Cayden Wallace sacrifice fly tying the contest at 1. Arkansas took the lead two batters later, as Casey Opitz's triple drove home two runs and gave Arkansas a 3–1 lead. An RBI single by Jake Slunder in the top of the fourth inning brought the deficit to one run, and the Racers continued their scoring in the top of the fifth. With Connor Noland entering to pitch for Arkansas, a one-out single followed by a two-run homer from Brock Anderson gave the Racers the lead, and Noland was pulled himself in favor of Zack Morris. Morris's first batter was Trey Woosley, who homered on the seventh pitch of the at bat and extended the Racer lead to three runs. Both offenses were relatively quiet from then until the bottom of the sixth inning, when Robert Moore's home run scored himself and Jalen Battles and made it a one-run game again. The Hogs threatened again in the bottom of the seventh, but stranded runners on second and third and were unable to capitalize. Ryan Costeiu entered the game to pitch the eighth inning for Arkansas, and walked two batters before being replaced in favor of Kevin Kopps. A wild pitch and a walk loaded the bases for the Racers, though a strikeout ended the inning and ensured the Racers' lead remained at one. Arkansas took the lead shortly thereafter, as Zack Gregory walked and Robert Moore hit his second home run of the game, putting Arkansas ahead 7–6. Jaxon Wiggins entered the game to pitch the ninth inning for Arkansas, and finished the game with a 1-2-3 inning, earning his first save of the year in the process. Kopps was awarded the win, and Alec Whaley got the loss for Murray State.

==== Louisiana Tech weekend series ====
No. 1 Arkansas at Louisiana Tech — Linescores

No. 1 Arkansas Razorbacks	at	Louisiana Tech Bulldogs

March 12, 2021, 6:00 p.m. (CDT) at J. C. Love Field at Pat Patterson Park in Ruston, Louisiana
Team	1	2	3	4	5	6	7	8	9	10	R	H	E
No. 1 Arkansas	0	0	0	3	0	1	0	3	0	2	9	9	2
Louisiana Tech	0	0	0	0	4	1	2	0	0	0	7	13	1
WP: Kevin Kopps (3–0) LP: Cade Gibson (0–1) Sv: Jaxon Wiggins (1); Home runs: ARK – Matt Goodheart (2), Cayden Wallace (3), Jalen Battles (1)

March 13, 2021, 2:00 p.m. (CDT) at J. C. Love Field at Pat Patterson Park in Ruston, Louisiana
Team	1	2	3	4	5	6	7	8	9	R	H	E
No. 1 Arkansas	2	0	0	2	1	0	0	3	0	8	12	0
Louisiana Tech	0	0	0	1	0	0	0	0	0	1	4	0
WP: Zebulon Vermillion (1–0) LP: Ryan Jennings (0–1); Home runs: ARK – Cayden Wallace (4)

March 14, 2021, 11:00 a.m. (CDT) at J. C. Love Field at Pat Patterson Park in Ruston, Louisiana
Team	1	2	3	4	5	6	7	8	9	R	H	E
No. 1 Arkansas	0	0	0	0	0	0	0	0	0	0	2	0
Louisiana Tech	0	0	0	0	2	0	0	0	X	2	5	1
WP: Jarret Whorff (3–1) LP: Lael Lockhart (1–1)

==== Oklahoma midweek game ====
Oklahoma at No. 1 Arkansas — Linescore

Oklahoma Sooners	at	No. 1 Arkansas Razorbacks

March 16, 2021, 5:00 p.m. (CDT) at Baum–Walker Stadium in Fayetteville, Arkansas
Team	1	2	3	4	5	6	7	8	9	R	H	E
Oklahoma	0	0	5	1	0	2	0	0	0	8	11	2
No. 1 Arkansas	2	0	0	0	0	2	0	1	0	5	6	2
WP: Braden Carmichael (3–0) LP: Kole Ramage (0–1) Sv: Jason Ruffcorn (1); Home runs: OU – Breydon Daniel (1); ARK – Robert Moore (4), Brady Slavens (5)

==== Alabama weekend series ====
Alabama at No. 1 Arkansas — Linescores

Alabama Crimson Tide	at	No. 1 Arkansas Razorbacks

March 19, 2021, 6:30 p.m. (CDT) at Baum–Walker Stadium in Fayetteville, Arkansas
Team	1	2	3	4	5	6	7	8	9	R	H	E
Alabama	0	10	0	0	0	0	1	4	1	16	15	0
No. 1 Arkansas	0	1	0	0	0	0	0	0	0	1	8	1
WP: Tyler Ras (3–1) LP: Peyton Pallette (1–1) Sv: Connor Shamblin (1); Home runs: ALA – Owen Diodati (5), Andrew Pinckney (1), Caden Rose (2), Jackson Tate (1); ARK – Christian Franklin (4)

March 20, 2021, 6:30 p.m. (CDT) at Baum–Walker Stadium in Fayetteville, Arkansas
Team	1	2	3	4	5	6	7	8	9	R	H	E
Alabama	0	0	0	0	0	1	0	0	0	1	2	1
No. 1 Arkansas	0	0	1	1	1	3	0	3	X	9	12	0
WP: Zebulon Vermillion (2–0) LP: Dylan Smith (0–2); Home runs: ARK – Casey Opitz (1)

March 21, 2021, 2:00 p.m. (CDT) at Baum–Walker Stadium in Fayetteville, Arkansas
Team	1	2	3	4	5	6	7	8	9	R	H	E
Alabama	0	0	0	0	0	0	0	0	1	1	4	2
No. 1 Arkansas	0	0	0	1	0	2	0	0	X	3	5	0
WP: Kevin Kopps (4–0) LP: Antoine Jean (2–1) Sv: Jaxon Wiggins (3); Home runs: ALA – Sam Praytor (4); ARK – Brady Slavens (6)

==== Memphis midweek series ====
Memphis at No. 2 Arkansas — Linescores

Memphis Tigers	at	No. 2 Arkansas Razorbacks

March 23, 2021, 6:30 p.m. (CDT) at Baum–Walker Stadium in Fayetteville, Arkansas
Team	1	2	3	4	5	6	7	8	9	R	H	E
Memphis	0	0	0	0	1	0	0	0	0	1	3	1
No. 2 Arkansas	1	3	0	0	0	0	1	9	X	14	13	0
WP: Ryan Costeiu (2–0) LP: Dalton Kendrick (0–1); Home runs: ARK – Braydon Webb (1), Cayden Wallace (5), Jacob Nesbit (2)

March 24, 2021, 3:00 p.m. (CDT) at Baum–Walker Stadium in Fayetteville, Arkansas
Team	1	2	3	4	5	6	7	8	9	R	H	E
Memphis	1	0	1	1	0	0	1	0	0	4	4	1
No. 2 Arkansas	0	0	3	1	0	3	1	1	X	9	14	1
WP: Caden Monke (2–0) LP: Logan Walters (1–1) Sv: Kole Ramage (1); Home runs: MEM – Ben Brooks (3); ARK – Matt Goodheart (3), Zack Gregory (2)

==== Mississippi State weekend series ====
No. 2 Arkansas at No. 3 Mississippi State — Linescores

No. 2 Arkansas Razorbacks	at	No. 3 Mississippi State Bulldogs

March 26, 2021, 6:30 p.m. (CDT) at Dudy Noble Field, Polk–DeMent Stadium in Starkville, Mississippi
Team	1	2	3	4	5	6	7	8	9	R	H	E
No. 2 Arkansas	3	0	0	2	0	0	2	0	1	8	10	0
No. 3 Mississippi State	0	0	0	0	1	0	0	0	1	2	4	1
WP: Patrick Wicklander (1–0) LP: Christian MacLeod (2–2) Sv: Peyton Pallette (1); Home runs: ARK – Matt Goodheart (4), Cayden Wallace (6), Christian Franklin×2 (6)

March 27, 2021, 2:00 p.m. (CDT) at Dudy Noble Field, Polk–DeMent Stadium in Starkville, Mississippi
Team	1	2	3	4	5	6	7	8	9	R	H	E
No. 2 Arkansas	0	0	1	0	4	3	2	0	1	11	13	1
No. 3 Mississippi State	3	0	1	0	1	0	0	0	0	5	10	2
WP: Caden Monke (3–0) LP: Brandon Smith (3–1) Sv: Kevin Kopps (2); Home runs: ARK – Braydon Webb (2), Christian Franklin (7), Cullen Smith (2), Matt Goodheart (5); MSST – Kamren James (5), Tanner Allen (3)

March 28, 2021, 2:00 p.m. (CDT) at Dudy Noble Field, Polk–DeMent Stadium in Starkville, Mississippi
Team	1	2	3	4	5	6	7	8	9	R	H	E
No. 2 Arkansas	0	0	0	5	0	1	0	0	0	6	7	0
No. 3 Mississippi State	0	0	0	2	0	2	0	0	0	4	13	1
WP: Ryan Costeiu (3–0) LP: Jackson Fristoe (2–2) Sv: Jaxon Wiggins (4); Home runs: ARK – Matt Goodheart (6); MSST – Luke Hancock (), Logan Tanner ()

== Record vs. conference opponents ==
Last two do not qualify for conf. tourn. Blank are not scheduled. Blue are home games, otherwise away.

2021 SEC baseball records Source: 2021 SEC baseball game results, 2021 SEC baseball schedule
Team	W–L	ALA	ARK	AUB	FLA	UGA	KEN	LSU	MSU	MIZZ	MISS	SCAR	TENN	TAMU	VAN	Team	Div	SR	SW
ALA	12–17		1–2	2–1	.	.	1–2	1–2	0–3	3–0	0–3	.	1–2	3–0	0–2	ALA	W5	3–7	2–2
ARK	22–8	2–1		2–1	3–0	2–1	.	2–1	3–0	.	2–1	2–1	2–1	2–1	.	ARK	W1	10–0	2–0
AUB	10–20	1–2	1–2		1–2	2–1	0–3	1–2	0–3	2–1	0–3	.	.	2–1	.	AUB	W6	3–7	0–3
FLA	17–13	.	0–3	2–1		2–1	2–1	.	.	3–0	2–1	0–3	1–2	3–0	2–1	FLA	E3	7–3	2–2
UGA	13–17	.	1–2	1–2	1–2		2–1	.	.	2–1	1–2	1–2	1–2	1–2	2–1	UGA	E5	3–7	0–0
KEN	12–18	2–1	.	3–0	1–2	1–2		1–2	0–3	2–1	.	0–3	1–2	.	1–2	KEN	E6	3–7	1–2
LSU	13–17	2–1	1–2	2–1	.	.	2–1		1–2	.	2–1	1–2	0–3	2–1	0–3	LSU	W4	5–5	0–2
MSU	20–10	3–0	0–3	3–0	.	.	3–0	2–1		1–2	2–1	2–1	.	3–0	1–2	MSU	W2	7–3	4–1
MIZZ	8–22	0–3	.	1–2	0–3	1–2	1–2	.	2–1		.	1–2	0–3	2–1	0–3	MIZZ	E7	2–8	0–4
MISS	18–12	3–0	1–2	3–0	1–2	2–1	.	1–2	1–2	.		3–0	.	1–2	2–1	MISS	W3	5–5	3–0
SCAR	16–14	.	1–2	.	3–0	2–1	3–0	2–1	1–2	2–1	0–3		1–2	.	1–2	SCAR	E4	5–5	2–1
TENN	20–10	2–1	1–2	.	2–1	2–1	2–1	3–0	.	3–0	.	2–1		2–1	1–2	TENN	E1	8–2	2–0
TAMU	9–21	0–3	1–2	1–2	0–3	2–1	.	1–2	0–3	1–2	2–1	.	1–2		.	TAMU	W7	2–8	0–3
VAN	19–10	2–0	.	.	1–2	1–2	2–1	3–0	2–1	3–0	1–2	2–1	2–1	.		VAN	E2	7–3	2–0
Team	W–L	ALA	ARK	AUB	FLA	UGA	KEN	LSU	MSU	MIZZ	MISS	SCAR	TENN	TAMU	VAN	Team	Div	SR	SW

Updated for entire regular season.

== Rankings ==
Ranking movements Legend: ██ Increase in ranking ██ Decrease in ranking ( ) = First-place votes
	Week																			
Poll	Pre	1	2	3	4	5	6	7	8	9	10	11	12	13	14	15	16	17	18	Final
Coaches'	8	8*	1 (20)	1 (26)	1 (24)	2 (6)	2 (9)	2 (1)	1 (31)	1 (30)	1 (28)	1 (32)	1 (31)	1 (32)	1 (32)	1 (32)				
Baseball America	14	6	1	1	1	1	1	1	1	1	1	1	1	1	1	1				
Collegiate Baseball^	22	5	1	1	1	5	4	2	1	1	1	1	1	1	1	1				
NCBWA†	8	3	1	1	1	3	2	2	1	1	1	1	1	1	1	1				
D1Baseball	8	2	1	1	1	2	2	2	1	1	1	1	1	1	1	1				

^ Collegiate Baseball ranked 40 teams in their preseason poll, but only ranked 30 teams weekly during the season.
† NCBWA ranks 30 teams in their preseason poll, but only ranks 25 teams weekly during the season.
* A new poll was not released for this week, so for comparison purposes, the previous week's ranking is inserted in this week's slot.

== 2021 MLB draft ==
Player	Position	Round	Overall	MLB team
Kevin Kopps	RHP	3	99	San Diego Padres
Christian Franklin	OF	4	123	Chicago Cubs
Ryan Costeiu	RHP	7	201	Los Angeles Angels
Casey Opitz	C	8	244	Chicago Cubs
Patrick Wicklander	LHP	8	251	Tampa Bay Rays
Lael Lockhart	LHP	9	282	Los Angeles Dodgers
Caden Monke	LHP	14	409	Kansas City Royals
Elijah Trest	RHP	19	560	Colorado Rockies
Charlie Welch	C	19	564	Seattle Mariners

Trest did not sign with the Rockies and returned to Arkansas.

== Awards ==
National and conference-level awards
Player	Position	Award	Date	Source
Caleb Bolden	P	SEC Co-Pitcher of the Week	February 23, 2021	
Casey Opitz	C	SEC Co-Player of the Week	March 22, 2021	
Matt Goodheart	DH	SEC Player of the Week	March 29, 2021	
Cayden Wallace	IF	SEC Co-Freshman of the Week	April 12, 2021	
Matt Goodheart	DH	Collegiate Baseball National Player of the Week	April 19, 2021	
Matt Goodheart	DH	Perfect Game National Player of the Week	April 19, 2021	
Cayden Wallace	IF	SEC Co-Freshman of the Week	April 19, 2021	
Kevin Kopps	P	Collegiate Baseball National Player of the Week	April 26, 2021	
Kevin Kopps	P	SEC Co-Pitcher of the Week	April 26, 2021	
Kevin Kopps	P	NCBWA Midseason Stopper of the Year Watchlist	April 28, 2021	
Christian Franklin	CF	SEC Player of the Week	May 3, 2021	
Kevin Kopps	P	NCBWA National Pitcher of the Month	May 5, 2021	
Kevin Kopps	P	Perfect Game National Pitcher of the Week	May 11, 2021	
Kevin Kopps	P	SEC Co-Pitcher of the Week	May 17, 2021	
Jacob Nesbit	3B	SEC Community Service Team	May 19, 2021	
Christian Franklin	CF	Dick Howser Trophy semifinalists	May 23, 2021	
Kevin Kopps	P	Dick Howser Trophy semifinalists	May 23, 2021	
Brady Slavens	1B	Dick Howser Trophy semifinalists	May 23, 2021	
Cayden Wallace	IF	SEC Freshman of the Week	May 24, 2021	
Patrick Wicklander	P	Collegiate Baseball National Player of the Week	May 24, 2021	
Kevin Kopps	P	2021 SEC Pitcher of the Year	May 24, 2021	
Jalen Battles	SS	SEC tournament Most Valuable Player	May 30, 2021	
Kevin Kopps	P	Collegiate Baseball National Player of the Year	June 3, 2021	
Kevin Kopps	P	34th Annual Dick Howser Trophy National Player of the Year	June 18, 2021	
Kevin Kopps	P	D1Baseball.com National Player of the Year	June 28, 2021	
Kevin Kopps	P	43rd Annual Golden Spikes Award National Amateur Player of the Year	July 15, 2021	

Team-level awards
Week	Player of the Week	Pitcher of the Week	Newcomer of the Week	Freshman of the Week	Source
2	Christian Franklin	Peyton Pallette	—	—	
3	Robert Moore	Lael Lockhart	—	Jaxon Wiggins	
4	Casey Opitz	Zebulon Vermillion	—	Cayden Wallace	
5	Casey Opitz (2)	Zebulon Vermillion (2)	—	Jaxon Wiggins (2)	
6	Matt Goodheart	Kevin Kopps	—	Cayden Wallace (2)	
7	Christian Franklin (2)	Kevin Kopps (2)	Robert Moore	Cayden Wallace (3)	
8	Jalen Battles	Kevin Kopps (3)	Robert Moore (2)	Cayden Wallace (4)	
9	Matt Goodheart (2)	Peyton Pallette (2)	—	Cayden Wallace (5)	
10	Kevin Kopps	Patrick Wicklander	—	Cayden Wallace (6)	
11	Christian Franklin (3)	Patrick Wicklander (2)	Robert Moore (3)	—	
12	Casey Opitz (3)	Kevin Kopps (3)	Robert Moore (4)	Cayden Wallace (7)	
13	Brady Slavens	Kevin Kopps (4)	Robert Moore (5)	Cayden Wallace (8)	

=== Postseason awards ===
Upon the conclusion of the conference season, the SEC handed out its postseason awards and named its all-conference teams for 2021. Right-handed pitcher Kevin Kopps was named the SEC Pitcher of the Year, the second Arkansas player to earn that honor, and head coach Dave Van Horn was named the SEC Coach of the Year for the second time. Kopps, alongside second baseman Robert Moore and designated hitter Matt Goodheart were named first team all-SEC players, with center fielder Christian Franklin and pitcher Patrick Wicklander making the all-SEC second team. Infielder Cayden Wallace was one of thirteen SEC players named to the all-conference freshman team, and a further two Razorbacks - Robert Moore and pitcher Peyton Pallette - made the newcomer all-SEC team. Three Razorbacks were named to the all-SEC defensive team: Christian Franklin, Robert Moore, and Kevin Kopps. On June 3, 2021, Kopps was named the National Player of the Year by the Collegiate Baseball Newspaper. He is the first reliever to ever be awarded that honor. On June 18, 2021, Kopps won the 34th annual Dick Howser Trophy, bestowed annually to the national college baseball player of the year. Kopps is the second player in Arkansas baseball history to win the Howser Trophy, along with Andrew Benintendi in 2015. The Howser Trophy is considered to be the Heisman Trophy of college baseball. On June 28, 2021, Kopps was named the D1Baseball.com National Player of the Year. On July 15, 2021, Kopps was named the winner of the 43rd annual Golden Spikes Award, given annually to the best amateur baseball player in the United States. He is the second Arkansas player to win this award after Benintendi in 2015.

== See also ==
- 2021 Arkansas Razorbacks softball team
