= 2021 Ole Miss Rebels baseball team =

Baseball team season

2021 Ole Miss Rebels baseball

Oxford Regional champions

Tucson Super Regional, 1–2
- Conference: Southeastern Conference
- Western Division

Ranking
- Coaches: No. 11
- CB: No. 11
- Record: 45–22 (18–12 SEC)
- Head coach: Mike Bianco (21st season)
- Assistant coach: Chris Cleary (1st season)
- Hitting coach: Mike Clement (7th season)
- Pitching coach: Carl Lafferty (15th season)
- Home stadium: Swayze Field

2021 Southeastern Conference baseball standings
| | Conf. | | | | Overall |
| Team | W | | L | PCT | W | | L | PCT |
|---|---|---|---|---|---|---|---|---|
Eastern
| No. 6 Tennessee ^{x}‍‍‍^{y} | 20 | – | 10 | .667 | 50 | – | 18 | .735 |
| No. 2 Vanderbilt ‍‍‍^{y} | 19 | – | 10 | .655 | 49 | – | 18 | .731 |
| Florida ‍‍‍^{y} | 17 | – | 13 | .567 | 38 | – | 22 | .633 |
| South Carolina ‍‍‍^{y} | 16 | – | 14 | .533 | 34 | – | 23 | .596 |
| Georgia ‍‍‍ | 13 | – | 17 | .433 | 31 | – | 25 | .554 |
| Kentucky ‍‍‍ | 12 | – | 18 | .400 | 29 | – | 23 | .558 |
| Missouri ‍‍‍ | 8 | – | 22 | .267 | 15 | – | 36 | .294 |
Western
| No. 5 Arkansas ^{x}‍†‍‡‍^{y} | 22 | – | 8 | .733 | 50 | – | 13 | .794 |
| No. 1 Mississippi State ‍‍‍^{y} | 20 | – | 10 | .667 | 50 | – | 18 | .735 |
| No. 13 Ole Miss ‍‍‍^{y} | 18 | – | 12 | .600 | 45 | – | 22 | .672 |
| No. 18 LSU ‍‍‍^{y} | 13 | – | 17 | .433 | 38 | – | 25 | .603 |
| Alabama ‍‍‍^{y} | 12 | – | 17 | .414 | 32 | – | 26 | .552 |
| Auburn ‍‍‍ | 10 | – | 20 | .333 | 25 | – | 27 | .481 |
| Texas A&M ‍‍‍ | 9 | – | 21 | .300 | 29 | – | 27 | .518 |
x – Division champion † – Conference champion ‡ – Tournament champion y – Invited to the NCAA tournament As of June 30, 2021; Rankings from D1Baseball

The 2021 Ole Miss Rebels baseball team represented the University of Mississippi in the 2021 NCAA Division I baseball season. The Rebels played their home games at Swayze Field.

== Previous season ==
The Rebels finished 16–1. They won sixteen games in a row before the season was canceled due to the COVID-19 pandemic.

=== 2020 MLB draft ===
The Rebels had two players drafted in the five-round 2020 MLB draft.

| Player | Position | Round | Overall | MLB Team |
|---|---|---|---|---|
| Anthony Servideo | Shortstop | 3 | 74 | Baltimore Orioles |
| Tyler Keenan | Third baseman | 4 | 107 | Seattle Mariners |

== Schedule and results ==
2021 Ole Miss Rebels baseball game log
Regular season

February
| Date | Opponent | Rank | Site/stadium | Score | Win | Loss | Save | TV | Attendance | Overall record | SEC record |
State Farm College Baseball Showdown
| February 20 | vs. No. 10 TCU | No. 6 | Globe Life Field; Arlington, TX | **W** 7–3 | **Jackson Kimbrell (1–0)** | Johnny Ray (0–1) | **Taylor Broadway (1)** | FloBaseball | 16,908 | 1–0 | |
| February 21 | vs. No. 3 Texas Tech | No. 6 | Globe Life Field | **W** 5–4 | **Gunnar Hoglund (1–0)** | Micah Dallas (0–1) | **Braden Forsyth (1)** | FloBaseball | 17,587 | 2–0 | |
| February 22 | vs. No. 9 Texas | No. 6 | Globe Life Field | **W** 8–1 | **Derek Diamond (1–0)** | Kolby Kubichek (0–1) | | FloBaseball | 13,659 | 3–0 | |
| February 24 | Arkansas State | No. 1 | Swayze Field; Oxford, MS | **W** 12–1 | **Drew McDaniel (1–0)** | Jack Jumper (0–1) | | SECN+ | 2,635 | 4–0 | |
| February 27 | UCF | No. 1 | Swayze Field | **L** 2–3 | Colton Gordon (1–0) | **Doug Nikhazy (0–1)** | David Litchfield (1) | SECN+ | 2,656 | 4–1 | |
| February 28 | UCF | No. 1 | Swayze Field | **W** 6–5 | **Jackson Kimbrell (2–0)** | David Litchfield (1–1) | | SECN+ | 2,744 | 5–1 | |
| February 28 | UCF | No. 1 | Swayze Field | **L** 2–7 | AJ Jones (1–0) | **Derek Diamond (1–1)** | | SECN+ | 2,744 | 5–2 | |

March
| Date | Opponent | Rank | Site/stadium | Score | Win | Loss | Save | TV | Attendance | Overall record | SEC record |
|---|---|---|---|---|---|---|---|---|---|---|---|
| March 2 | Memphis | No. 4 | Swayze Field | **W** 16–4 | **Drew McDaniel (2–0)** | Carson Stinnett (2–1) | | SECN+ | 2,721 | 6–2 | |
| March 3 | Jackson State | No. 4 | Swayze Field | **W** 12–1^{(7)} | **Tyler Myers (1–0)** | Brandon Valentin (0–1) | | SECN+ | 3,433 | 7–2 | |
| March 5 | Belmont | No. 4 | Swayze Field | **W** 12–4 | **Doug Nikhazy (1–1)** | Logan Bowen (1–1) | | SECN+ | 5,769 | 8–2 | |
| March 6 | Belmont | No. 4 | Swayze Field | **W** 4–3 | **Taylor Broadway (1–0)** | Aaron Hubbell (0–1) | | SECN+ | 5,847 | 9–2 | |
| March 7 | Belmont | No. 4 | Swayze Field | **W** 8–7 | **Taylor Broadway (2–0)** | Kyle Brennan (0–2) | | SECN+ | 5,773 | 10–2 | |
| March 9 | Alcorn State | No. 4 | Swayze Field | **W** 11–1^{(8)} | **Josh Mallitz (1–0)** | George Osborne (0–1) | | SECN+ | 5,790 | 11–2 | |
| March 12 | Louisiana–Monroe | No. 4 | Swayze Field | **W** 10–1 | **Gunnar Hoglund (2–0)** | Cam Barlow (2–1) | | SECN+ | 6,217 | 12–2 | |
| March 13 | Louisiana–Monroe | No. 4 | Swayze Field | **W** 6–5 | **Taylor Broadway (3–0)** | Reid Goleman (0–1) | | SECN+ | 6,577 | 13–2 | |
| March 14 | Louisiana–Monroe | No. 4 | Swayze Field | **L** 3–8 | Bryson Wrobel (1–1) | **Derek Diamond (1–2)** | | SECN+ | 6,266 | 13–3 | |
| March 16 | at Louisiana Tech | No. 4 | J. C. Love Field at Pat Patterson Park; Ruston, LA | **L** 1–13 | Cade Gibson (1–1) | **Josh Mallitz (1–1)** | | | 1,000 | 13–4 | |
| March 17 | at Louisiana Tech | No. 4 | J. C. Love Field at Pat Patterson Park | | | | | | | | |
| March 19 | Auburn | No. 4 | Swayze Field | **W** 1–0 | **Gunnar Hoglund (3–0)** | Joseph Gonzalez (0–1) | **Taylor Broadway (2)** | SECN+ | 9,358 | 14–4 | 1–0 |
| March 20 | Auburn | No. 4 | Swayze Field | **W** 6–5 | **Drew McDaniel (3–0)** | Mason Barnett (2–1) | **Taylor Broadway (3)** | SECN+ | 10,304 | 15–4 | 2–0 |
| March 21 | Auburn | No. 4 | Swayze Field | **W** 19–11 | **Derek Diamond (2–2)** | Trace Bright (2–2) | | SECN+ | 8,725 | 16–4 | 3–0 |
| March 23 | Central Arkansas | No. 4 | Swayze Field | **W** 5–2 | **Josh Mallitz (2–1)** | Ryan Johnston (1–3) | **Taylor Broadway (4)** | SECN+ | 6,847 | 17–4 | |
| March 26 | at Alabama | No. 4 | Sewell–Thomas Stadium; Tuscaloosa, AL | **W** 9–6 | **Tyler Myers (2–0)** | Brock Guffey (0–1) | **Taylor Broadway (5)** | SECN+ | 1,764 | 18–4 | 4–0 |
| March 26 | at Alabama | No. 4 | Sewell–Thomas Stadium | **W** 2–0 | **Doug Nikhazy (2–1)** | Dylan Smith (0–3) | **Taylor Broadway (6)** | SECN+ | 1,764 | 19–4 | 5–0 |
| March 27 | at Alabama | No. 4 | Sewell–Thomas Stadium | **W** 11–6 | **Derek Diamond (3–2)** | Connor Shamblin (2–1) | | SECN | 1,764 | 20–4 | 6–0 |

April
| Date | Opponent | Rank | Site/stadium | Score | Win | Loss | Save | TV | Attendance | Overall record | SEC record |
|---|---|---|---|---|---|---|---|---|---|---|---|
| April 1 | at No. 15 Florida | No. 3 | Florida Ballpark; Gainesville, FL | **L** 1–4 | Franco Aleman (1–1) | **Gunnar Hoglund (3–1)** | Tommy Mace (1) | SECN | 2,335 | 20–5 | 6–1 |
| April 2 | at No. 15 Florida | No. 3 | Florida Ballpark | **W** 8–2 | **Drew McDaniel (4–0)** | Jack Leftwich (4–2) | **Taylor Broadway (7)** | SECN+ | 2,009 | 21–5 | 7–1 |
| April 3 | at No. 15 Florida | No. 3 | Florida Ballpark | **L** 5–6 | Hunter Barco (4–2) | **Derek Diamond (3–3)** | Ryan Cabarcas (1) | SECN+ | 2,894 | 21–6 | 7–2 |
| April 5 | North Alabama | No. 3 | Swayze Field | **W** 20–6^{(7)} | **Josh Mallitz (3–1)** | Brycen Parrish (0–2) | | SECN+ | 6,882 | 22–6 | |
| April 6 | Alcorn State | No. 3 | Swayze Field | **W** 8–1 | **Jackson Kimbrell (3–0)** | George Osborne (0–2) | | SECN+ | 6,889 | 23–6 | |
| April 9 | No. 2 Arkansas | No. 3 | Swayze Field | **L** 3–7 | Ryan Costeiu (5–0) | **Tyler Myers (2–1)** | Kevin Kopps (4) | SECN | 11,524 | 23–7 | 7–3 |
| April 10 | No. 2 Arkansas | No. 3 | Swayze Field | **W** 13–6 | **Doug Nikhazy (3–1)** | Peyton Pallette (1–2) | **Taylor Broadway (8)** | SECN+ | 11,857 | 24–7 | 8–3 |
| April 11 | No. 2 Arkansas | No. 3 | Swayze Field | **L** 14–18 | Kevin Kopps (5–0) | **Braden Forsyth (0–1)** | | SECN+ | 10,042 | 24–8 | 8–4 |
| April 13 | Austin Peay | No. 6 | Swayze Field | **W** 13–1^{(7)} | **Tyler Myers (3–1)** | Sebastian Martinez (2–2) | | SECN+ | 6,873 | 25–8 | |
| April 16 | at No. 4 Mississippi State | No. 6 | Dudy Noble Field; Starkville, MS | **L** 2–5 | Preston Johnson (1–0) | **Gunnar Hoglund (3–2)** | Landon Sims (4) | SECN | 10,291 | 25–9 | 8–5 |
| April 17 | at No. 4 Mississippi State | No. 6 | Dudy Noble Field | **W** 9–0 | **Doug Nikhazy (4–1)** | Will Bednar (2–1) | | SECN+ | 13,338 | 26–9 | 9–5 |
| April 18 | at No. 4 Mississippi State | No. 6 | Dudy Noble Field | **L** 5–7 | Houston Harding (4–1) | **Austin Miller (0–1)** | Landon Sims (5) | SECN+ | 10,522 | 26–10 | 9–6 |
| April 20 | Little Rock | No. 12 | Swayze Field | **W** 11–6 | **Jackson Kimbrell (4–0)** | Chance Vaught (0–1) | | SECN+ | 6,851 | 27–10 | |
| April 22 | LSU | No. 12 | Swayze Field | **L** 4–5 | Garrett Edwards (2–2) | **Taylor Broadway (3–1)** | Devin Fontenot (3) | ESPNU | 9,035 | 27–11 | 9–7 |
| April 23 | LSU | No. 12 | Swayze Field | **L** 2–7 | AJ Labas (3–0) | **Doug Nikhazy (4–2)** | | SECN+ | 11,788 | 27–12 | 9–8 |
| April 24 | LSU | No. 12 | Swayze Field | **W** 10–9 | **Taylor Broadway (4–1)** | Ty Floyd (0–2) | | SECN+ | 11,653 | 28–12 | 10–8 |
| April 30 | No. 13 South Carolina | No. 19 | Swayze Field | **W** 5–1 | **Gunnar Hoglund (4–2)** | Thomas Farr (2–5) | | SECN+ | 8,581 | 29–12 | 11–8 |

May
| Date | Opponent | Rank | Site/stadium | Score | Win | Loss | Save | TV | Attendance | Overall record | SEC record |
|---|---|---|---|---|---|---|---|---|---|---|---|
| May 1 | No. 13 South Carolina | No. 19 | Swayze Field | **W** 7–3 | **Doug Nikhazy (5–2)** | Brannon Jordan (4–3) | | SECN | 7,776 | 30–12 | 12–8 |
| May 1 | No. 13 South Carolina | No. 19 | Swayze Field | **W** 6–4 | **Jack Dougherty (1–0)** | Brett Kerry (3–1) | **Taylor Broadway (9)** | SECN+ | 8,879 | 31–12 | 13–8 |
| May 4 | Arkansas State | No. 12 | Swayze Field | **W** 15–12 | **Josh Mallitz (4–1)** | Tyler Jeans (1–2) | **Derek Diamond (1)** | SECN | 6,682 | 32–12 | |
| May 7 | at Texas A&M | No. 12 | Blue Bell Park; College Station, TX | **L** 8–9 | Bryce Miller (3–2) | **Jack Dougherty (1–1)** | | SECN+ | 1,718 | 32–13 | 13–9 |
| May 8 | at Texas A&M | No. 12 | Blue Bell Park | **W** 12–7 | **Doug Nikhazy (6–2)** | Mason Ornelas (3–1) | | ESPNU | 1,644 | 33–13 | 14–9 |
| May 9 | at Texas A&M | No. 12 | Blue Bell Park | **L** 5–6 | Chandler Jozwiak (2–3) | **Taylor Broadway (4–2)** | | ESPNU | 1,340 | 33–14 | 14–10 |
| May 12 | Little Rock | No. 18 | Swayze Field | **W** 9–4 | **Austin Miller (1–1)** | Luke Wallner (0–2) | | SECN+ | 6,703 | 34–14 | |
| May 14 | No. 2 Vanderbilt | No. 18 | Swayze Field | **W** 3–1 | **Doug Nikhazy (7–2)** | Kumar Rocker (11–2) | **Taylor Broadway (10)** | SECN | 8,986 | 35–14 | 15–10 |
| May 15 | No 2 Vanderbilt | No. 18 | Swayze Field | **L** 2–13 | Jack Leiter (8–2) | **Derek Diamond (3–4)** | Chris McElvain (2) | SECN+ | 10,267 | 35–15 | 15–11 |
| May 16 | No. 2 Vanderbilt | No. 18 | Swayze Field | **W** 13–10 | **Jackson Kimbrell (5–0)** | Patrick Reilly (4–2) | | SECN | 8,479 | 36–15 | 16–11 |
| May 18 | UT Martin | No. 13 | Swayze Field | **L** 7–9 | Eric Steensma (1–2) | **Tyler Myers (3–2)** | David Hussey (6) | SECN+ | 7,219 | 36–16 | |
| May 20 | at Georgia | No. 13 | Foley Field; Athens, GA | **W** 2–0 | **Doug Nikhazy (8–2)** | Michael Polk (2–1) | **Taylor Broadway (11)** | SECN+ | 1,577 | 37–16 | 17–11 |
| May 21 | at Georgia | No. 13 | Foley Field | **W** 8–5^{(11)} | **Brandon Johnson (1–0)** | Ben Harris (4–2) | **Taylor Broadway (12)** | SECN+ | 2,221 | 38–16 | 18–11 |
| May 22 | at Georgia | No. 13 | Foley Field | **L** 2–13 | Jonathan Cannon (4–2) | **Drew McDaniel (4–1)** | | SECN+ | 2,047 | 38–17 | 18–12 |

Postseason

SEC Tournament
| Date | Opponent | Seed | Site/stadium | Score | Win | Loss | Save | TV | Attendance | Overall record | SECT Record |
|---|---|---|---|---|---|---|---|---|---|---|---|
| May 25 | vs. (12) Auburn | (5) No. 12 | Hoover Metropolitan Stadium; Hoover, AL | **W** 7–4 | **Doug Nikhazy (9–2)** | Jack Owen (2–5) | **Taylor Broadway (13)** | SECN | 7,750 | 39–17 | 1–0 |
| May 26 | vs. (4) No. 3 Vanderbilt | (5) No. 12 | Hoover Metropolitan Stadium | **L** 4–5 | Luke Murphy (2–1) | **Jack Dougherty (1–2)** | | SECN | 7,200 | 39–18 | 1–1 |
| May 27 | vs. (8) Georgia | (5) No. 12 | Hoover Metropolitan Stadium | **W** 4–0 | **Drew McDaniel (5–1)** | Liam Sullivan (1–2) | | SECN | 4,737 | 40–18 | 2–1 |
| May 28 | vs. (4) No. 3 Vanderbilt | (5) No. 12 | Hoover Metropolitan Stadium | **W** 4–1 | **Tyler Myers (4–2)** | Jack Leiter (8–3) | **Brandon Johnson (1)** | SECN | 5,901 | 41–18 | 3–1 |
| May 29 | vs. (1) No. 1 Arkansas | (5) No. 12 | Hoover Metropolitan Stadium | **L** 2–3 | Heston Tole (1–0) | **Jackson Kimbrell (5–1)** | Connor Noland (1) | SECN | 8,735 | 41–19 | 3–2 |

NCAA tournament – Oxford Regional
| Date | Opponent | Seed | Site/stadium | Score | Win | Loss | Save | TV | Attendance | Overall record | NCAAT record |
|---|---|---|---|---|---|---|---|---|---|---|---|
| June 4 | (4) Southeast Missouri State | (1) No. 13 | Swayze Field | **W** 6–3 | **Jack Dougherty (2–2)** | Dylan Dodd (9–2) | **Taylor Broadway (14)** | ESPN3 | 10,736 | 42–19 | 1–0 |
| June 5 | (3) Florida State | (1) No. 13 | Swayze Field | **W** 4–3 | **Doug Nikhazy (10–2)** | Davis Hare (1–2) | **Taylor Broadway (15)** | ESPN2 | 10,830 | 43–19 | 2–0 |
| June 6 | (2) No. 20 Southern Miss | (1) No. 13 | Swayze Field | **L** 7–10 | Chandler Best (2–1) | **Drew McDaniel (5–2)** | Tanner Hall (1) | ESPNU | 10,628 | 43–20 | 2–1 |
| June 7 | (2) No. 20 Southern Miss | (1) No. 13 | Swayze Field | **W** 12–9 | **Doug Nikhazy (11–2)** | Ben Ethridge (6–2) | **Taylor Broadway (16)** | ESPN2 | 10,293 | 44–20 | 3–1 |

NCAA tournament – Tucson Super Regional
| Date | Opponent | Seed | Site/stadium | Score | Win | Loss | Save | TV | Attendance | Overall record | NCAAT record |
|---|---|---|---|---|---|---|---|---|---|---|---|
| June 11 | at (5) No. 5 Arizona | (12) No. 13 | Hi Corbett Field; Tucson, AZ | **L** 3–9 | Riley Cooper (3–0) | **Derek Diamond (3–5)** | | ESPNU | 5,839 | 44–21 | 3–2 |
| June 12 | at (5) No. 5 Arizona | (12) No. 13 | Hi Corbett Field | **W** 12–3 | **Doug Nikhazy (12–2)** | Garrett Irvin (6–3) | **Austin Miller (1)** | ESPN2 | 7,450 | 45–21 | 4–2 |
| June 13 | at (5) No. 5 Arizona | (12) No. 13 | Hi Corbett Field | **L** 3–16 | TJ Nichols (6–3) | **Taylor Broadway (4–3)** | | ESPN2 | 5,139 | 45–22 | 4–3 |

Legend: = Win = Loss = Canceled
Bold = Ole Miss team member
Rankings are based on the team's current ranking in the D1Baseball poll.

Schedule source:

== Roster ==
2021 Ole Miss Rebels baseball team
Players
Coaches

| # | Pos. | Name | B/T | Height | Weight | Year | Previous school | Home town |
|---|---|---|---|---|---|---|---|---|
| 1 | INF | Peyton Chatagnier | R/R | 5 ft 10 in (1.78 m) | 175 lb (79 kg) | So | Cy-Fair | Cypress, TX |
| 2 | RHP | Derek Diamond | R/R | 6 ft 2 in (1.88 m) | 200 lb (91 kg) | So | Ramona | Ramona, CA |
| 3 | OF | Hudson Sapp | R/R | 5 ft 10 in (1.78 m) | 190 lb (86 kg) | Fr | Dawson County | Dawsonville, GA |
| 4 | C | Knox Loposer | R/R | 5 ft 10 in (1.78 m) | 195 lb (88 kg) | Jr | Jackson Prep | Madison, MS |
| 6 | OF | Cade Sammons | L/L | 5 ft 10 in (1.78 m) | 175 lb (79 kg) | So | University School | Jackson, TN |
| 7 | INF | Jacob Gonzalez | L/R | 6 ft 2 in (1.88 m) | 200 lb (91 kg) | Fr | Glendora | Glendora, CA |
| 8 | INF | Justin Bench | R/R | 6 ft 0 in (1.83 m) | 185 lb (84 kg) | Jr | Calvary Christian | Redington Beach, FL |
| 9 | OF | Hayden Leatherwood | L/R | 6 ft 1 in (1.85 m) | 200 lb (91 kg) | Sr | Christian Brothers; Northwest Mississippi CC | Collierville, TN |
| 10 | OF | John Rhys Plumlee | R/R | 6 ft 0 in (1.83 m) | 200 lb (91 kg) | So | Oak Grove | Hattiesburg, MS |
| 12 | RHP | Greer Holston | R/R | 6 ft 4 in (1.93 m) | 215 lb (98 kg) | Sr | IMG Academy | Long Beach, MS |
| 13 | C | Hayden Dunhurst | L/R | 5 ft 11 in (1.8 m) | 220 lb (100 kg) | So | Pearl River Central | Carriere, MS |
| 14 | INF | Trey LaFleur | L/L | 6 ft 3 in (1.91 m) | 190 lb (86 kg) | So | J. M. Tate | Pensacola, FL |
| 16 | INF | TJ McCants | L/R | 6 ft 3 in (1.91 m) | 190 lb (86 kg) | Fr | Pensacola Catholic | Cantonment, FL |
| 17 | RHP | Gunnar Hoglund | L/R | 6 ft 4 in (1.93 m) | 220 lb (100 kg) | Jr | Dayspring Christian | Hudson, FL |
| 18 | RHP | Mitch Murrell | R/R | 6 ft 4 in (1.93 m) | 210 lb (95 kg) | So | Ocean Springs | Ocean Springs, MS |
| 19 | INF | Cael Baker | R/R | 6 ft 0 in (1.83 m) | 250 lb (113 kg) | Sr | Gahanna Lincoln; Wabash Valley College | Gahanna, OH |
| 20 | C | Calvin Harris | L/R | 6 ft 0 in (1.83 m) | 205 lb (93 kg) | Fr | Western Dubuque | Peosta, IA |
| 21 | RHP | Drew McDaniel | R/R | 6 ft 2 in (1.88 m) | 185 lb (84 kg) | So | St. Thomas More Catholic | Lafayette, LA |
| 22 | RHP | Max Cioffi | R/R | 6 ft 4 in (1.93 m) | 220 lb (100 kg) | Sr | St. Patrick | Chicago, IL |
| 23 | RHP | Josh Mallitz | R/R | 6 ft 3 in (1.91 m) | 195 lb (88 kg) | Fr | Tampa Jesuit | Tampa, FL |
| 24 | LHP | Jackson Kimbrell | R/L | 6 ft 1 in (1.85 m) | 195 lb (88 kg) | So | Oak Mountain | Birmingham, AL |
| 25 | INF | Tim Elko | R/R | 6 ft 4 in (1.93 m) | 240 lb (109 kg) | Sr | Hillsborough | Lutz, FL |
| 26 | LHP | Doug Nikhazy | L/L | 6 ft 0 in (1.83 m) | 205 lb (93 kg) | Jr | West Orange | Windermere, FL |
| 27 | RHP | Taylor Broadway | R/R | 5 ft 11 in (1.8 m) | 205 lb (93 kg) | Sr | Cypress Christian; Tyler JC | Cypress, TX |
| 28 | RHP | Austin Miller | R/R | 6 ft 7 in (2.01 m) | 215 lb (98 kg) | Sr | Iowa City West; Kirkwood CC | North Liberty, IA |
| 29 | RHP | Braden Forsyth | R/R | 6 ft 3 in (1.91 m) | 215 lb (98 kg) | Jr | Magnolia Heights; Meridian CC | Coldwater, MS |
| 32 | RHP | Kemp Alderman | R/R | 6 ft 3 in (1.91 m) | 265 lb (120 kg) | Fr | Newton County Academy | Decatur, MS |
| 33 | INF | Ben Van Cleve | R/R | 6 ft 3 in (1.91 m) | 265 lb (120 kg) | Sr | Indianola Academy; Northwest Mississippi CC | Indianola, MS |
| 34 | RHP | Tyler Myers | R/R | 6 ft 1 in (1.85 m) | 180 lb (82 kg) | Sr | Dobie; Paris JC | Houston, TX |
| 35 | INF | Kevin Graham | L/R | 6 ft 1 in (1.85 m) | 195 lb (88 kg) | Jr | Westminster Christian Academy | O'Fallon, MO |
| 37 | RHP | Brandon Johnson | R/R | 6 ft 0 in (1.83 m) | 195 lb (88 kg) | Jr | Brookwood; Columbia State CC | Cottondale, AL |
| 38 | RHP | Logan Savell | R/R | 6 ft 4 in (1.93 m) | 185 lb (84 kg) | RS So | Madison Central | Madison, MS |
| 39 | RHP | Jack Dougherty | R/R | 6 ft 4 in (1.93 m) | 215 lb (98 kg) | Fr | Collierville | Collierville, TN |
| 40 | INF | Garrett Wood | R/R | 5 ft 11 in (1.8 m) | 175 lb (79 kg) | Jr | Claremore; Johnson County CC | Claremore, OK |
| 43 | RHP | Cole Baker | R/R | 6 ft 2 in (1.88 m) | 195 lb (88 kg) | So | Hoover | Hoover, AL |
| 44 | LHP | Luke Baker | L/L | 6 ft 6 in (1.98 m) | 200 lb (91 kg) | Fr | Buchholz | Gainesville, FL |
| 45 | RHP | Jacob Payne | R/R | 6 ft 3 in (1.91 m) | 215 lb (98 kg) | Fr | Madison Central | Madison, MS |
| 47 | RHP | Luke Lyon | R/R | 6 ft 2 in (1.88 m) | 220 lb (100 kg) | Fr | Oak Grove | Hattiesburg, MS |
| 48 | OF | Jerrion Ealy | R/R | 5 ft 8 in (1.73 m) | 190 lb (86 kg) | So | Jackson Prep | Walnut Grove, MS |
| 49 | RHP | Cody Adcock | R/R | 6 ft 3 in (1.91 m) | 205 lb (93 kg) | Fr | Arkansas HS | Texarkana, AR |
| 55 | RHP | Wes Burton | R/R | 6 ft 8 in (2.03 m) | 235 lb (107 kg) | So | Windward | Santa Monica, CA |

Head coach

Mike Bianco (LSU)

Assistant coach(es)

Mike Clement (Morningside)
Carl Lafferty (Ole Miss)

Legend

- (C) Team captain
- (S) Suspended
- (I) Ineligible
- Injured
- Current redshirt

Roster

== Record vs. conference opponents ==
Last two do not qualify for conf. tourn. Blank are not scheduled. Blue are home games, otherwise away.

2021 SEC baseball records Source: 2021 SEC baseball game results, 2021 SEC baseball schedule
| Team | W–L | ALA | ARK | AUB | FLA | UGA | KEN | LSU | MSU | MIZZ | MISS | SCAR | TENN | TAMU | VAN | Team | Div | SR | SW |
|---|---|---|---|---|---|---|---|---|---|---|---|---|---|---|---|---|---|---|---|
| ALA | 12–17 | | 1–2 | 2–1 | . | . | 1–2 | 1–2 | 0–3 | 3–0 | 0–3 | . | 1–2 | 3–0 | 0–2 | ALA | W5 | 3–7 | 2–2 |
| ARK | 22–8 | 2–1 | | 2–1 | 3–0 | 2–1 | . | 2–1 | 3–0 | . | 2–1 | 2–1 | 2–1 | 2–1 | . | ARK | W1 | 10–0 | 2–0 |
| AUB | 10–20 | 1–2 | 1–2 | | 1–2 | 2–1 | 0–3 | 1–2 | 0–3 | 2–1 | 0–3 | . | . | 2–1 | . | AUB | W6 | 3–7 | 0–3 |
| FLA | 17–13 | . | 0–3 | 2–1 | | 2–1 | 2–1 | . | . | 3–0 | 2–1 | 0–3 | 1–2 | 3–0 | 2–1 | FLA | E3 | 7–3 | 2–2 |
| UGA | 13–17 | . | 1–2 | 1–2 | 1–2 | | 2–1 | . | . | 2–1 | 1–2 | 1–2 | 1–2 | 1–2 | 2–1 | UGA | E5 | 3–7 | 0–0 |
| KEN | 12–18 | 2–1 | . | 3–0 | 1–2 | 1–2 | | 1–2 | 0–3 | 2–1 | . | 0–3 | 1–2 | . | 1–2 | KEN | E6 | 3–7 | 1–2 |
| LSU | 13–17 | 2–1 | 1–2 | 2–1 | . | . | 2–1 | | 1–2 | . | 2–1 | 1–2 | 0–3 | 2–1 | 0–3 | LSU | W4 | 5–5 | 0–2 |
| MSU | 20–10 | 3–0 | 0–3 | 3–0 | . | . | 3–0 | 2–1 | | 1–2 | 2–1 | 2–1 | . | 3–0 | 1–2 | MSU | W2 | 7–3 | 4–1 |
| MIZZ | 8–22 | 0–3 | . | 1–2 | 0–3 | 1–2 | 1–2 | . | 2–1 | | . | 1–2 | 0–3 | 2–1 | 0–3 | MIZZ | E7 | 2–8 | 0–4 |
| MISS | 18–12 | 3–0 | 1–2 | 3–0 | 1–2 | 2–1 | . | 1–2 | 1–2 | . | | 3–0 | . | 1–2 | 2–1 | MISS | W3 | 5–5 | 3–0 |
| SCAR | 16–14 | . | 1–2 | . | 3–0 | 2–1 | 3–0 | 2–1 | 1–2 | 2–1 | 0–3 | | 1–2 | . | 1–2 | SCAR | E4 | 5–5 | 2–1 |
| TENN | 20–10 | 2–1 | 1–2 | . | 2–1 | 2–1 | 2–1 | 3–0 | . | 3–0 | . | 2–1 | | 2–1 | 1–2 | TENN | E1 | 8–2 | 2–0 |
| TAMU | 9–21 | 0–3 | 1–2 | 1–2 | 0–3 | 2–1 | . | 1–2 | 0–3 | 1–2 | 2–1 | . | 1–2 | | . | TAMU | W7 | 2–8 | 0–3 |
| VAN | 19–10 | 2–0 | . | . | 1–2 | 1–2 | 2–1 | 3–0 | 2–1 | 3–0 | 1–2 | 2–1 | 2–1 | . | | VAN | E2 | 7–3 | 2–0 |
| Team | W–L | ALA | ARK | AUB | FLA | UGA | KEN | LSU | MSU | MIZZ | MISS | SCAR | TENN | TAMU | VAN | Team | Div | SR | SW |

Updated for entire regular season.

== 2021 MLB draft ==
| Player | Position | Round | Overall | MLB team |
|---|---|---|---|---|
| Gunnar Hoglund | RHP | 1 | 19 | Toronto Blue Jays |
| Doug Nikhazy | LHP | 2 | 58 | Cleveland Indians |
| Taylor Broadway | RHP | 6 | 185 | Chicago White Sox |

== See also ==
- 2021 Ole Miss Rebels softball team
