= Golden Spikes Award =

Annual award for the best amateur baseball player in the United States

- Logo for the Golden Spikes Award
- Awarded for: Amateur baseball's best regular season player
- Country: United States
- Presented by: USA Baseball

History
- First award: 1978
- Most recent: Daniel Jackson, Georgia
- Website: Golden Spikes Award

The Golden Spikes Award is bestowed annually to the best amateur baseball player in the United States. The award, created by USA Baseball and sponsored by the Major League Baseball Players Association, was first presented in 1978. It is given to an amateur player who best exhibits and combines "exceptional on-field ability and exemplary sportsmanship". Along with the Dick Howser Trophy, the Golden Spikes Award is considered the most prestigious in amateur baseball.

Ten winners of the Golden Spikes Award are members of the National College Baseball Hall of Fame, including Bob Horner, the inaugural winner in 1978. In that same year, he was the first overall MLB draft pick and proceeded to win the Rookie of the Year Award. Seven Golden Spikes Award winners went on to become the first overall MLB draft pick. Only Horner achieved the MLB Rookie of the Year Award in the same year (although Jason Jennings and Buster Posey were voted the top rookies of the National League several years after winning the Golden Spikes Award). Jim Abbott, Jered Weaver and Tim Lincecum are the only award winners to pitch an MLB no-hitter, while Horner is the only one to hit four home runs in one MLB game. Furthermore, 17 players won the Dick Howser Trophy (considered to be the Heisman Trophy of college baseball) alongside the Golden Spikes Award. No player has won the award more than once, and no Golden Spikes recipient has yet been inducted into the National Baseball Hall of Fame.

The winner has been announced annually during a live broadcast of ESPN's SportsCenter since 2014. Immediately following the announcement, the award winner and the other finalists are honored at a banquet in Los Angeles. The most recent recipient of the award is Daniel Jackson of the Georgia Bulldogs. Although it can be given to any amateur player, the award has always been given to a college baseball player.

== Winners ==
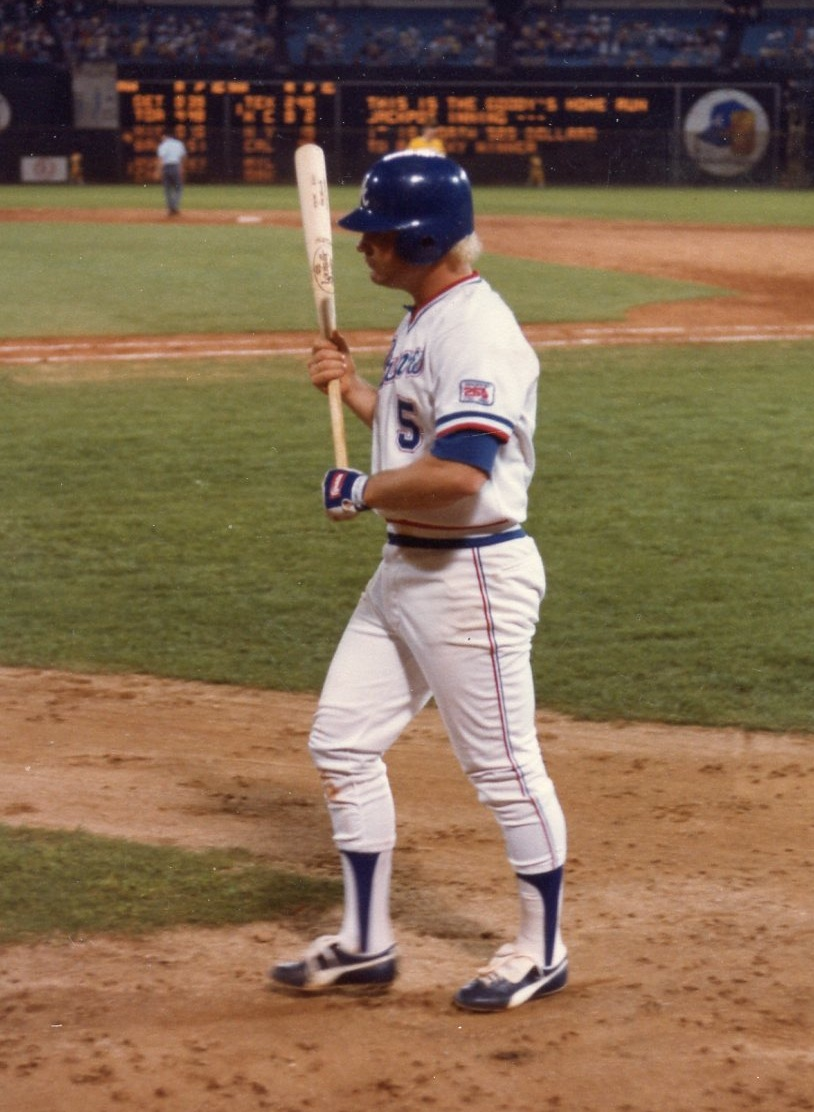
Bob Horner, who won the inaugural Golden Spikes Award in 1978, also received the Rookie of the Year Award and was the first overall MLB draft pick in the same year.

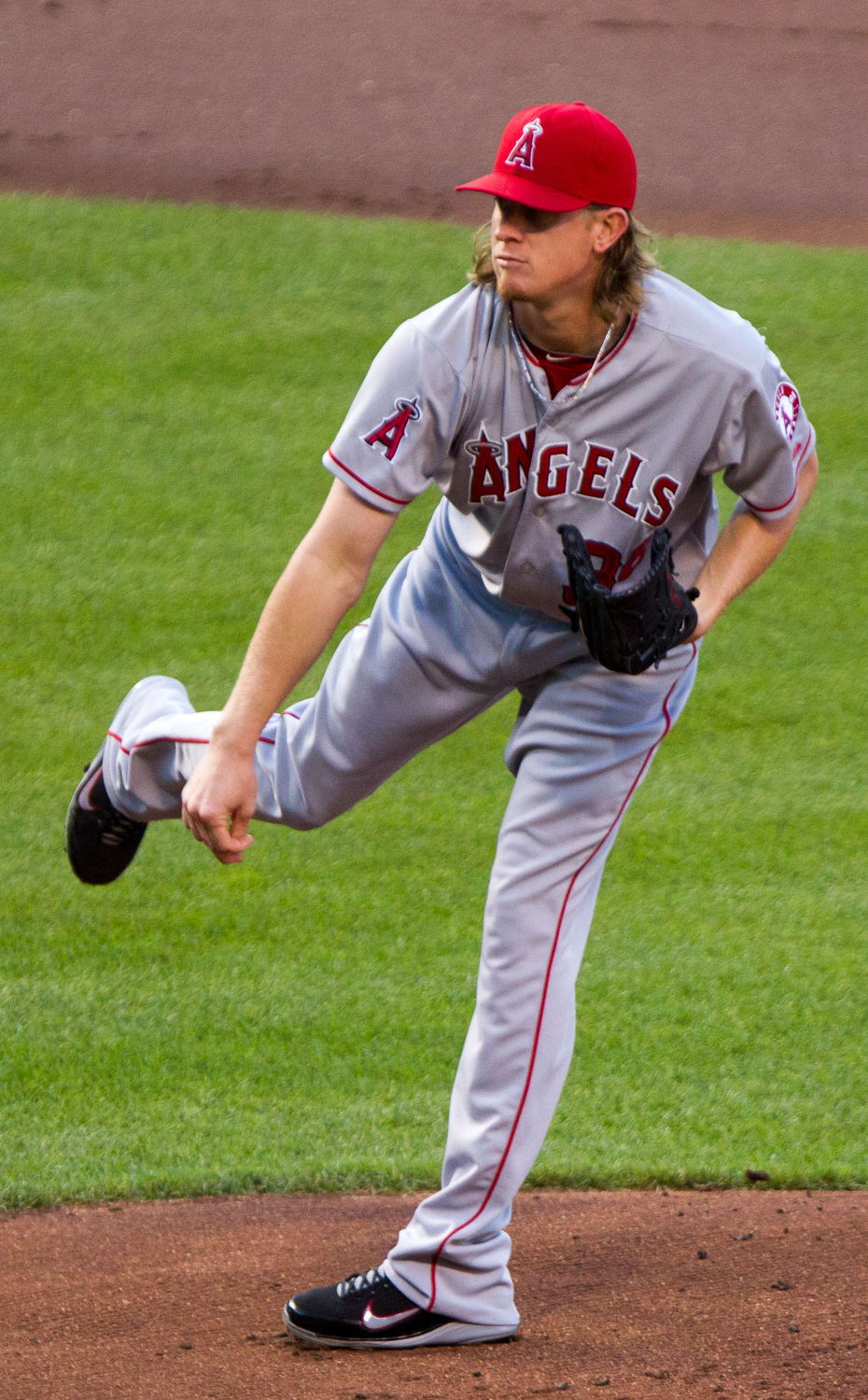
Jered Weaver, the 2004 recipient, is one of three award winners to pitch a no-hitter.

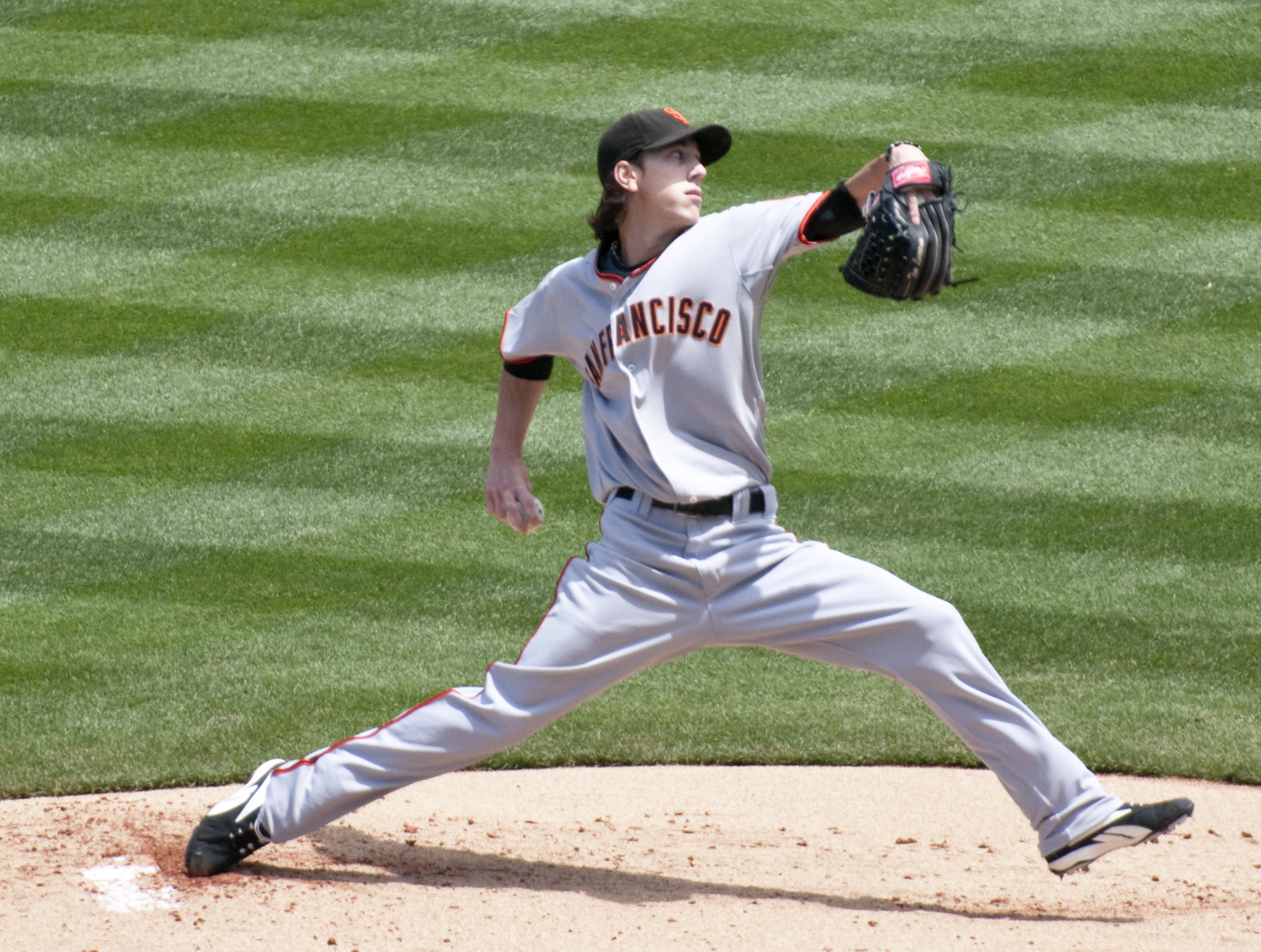
Tim Lincecum, the 2006 winner, received the Cy Young Award in 2008 and 2009.

Key
Year	Links to the article about the corresponding baseball year
Player	Name of the player
Position	The player's position(s) at the time he won the award (Note: This does not necessarily reflect the player's future position at Major League level. For example, Alex Gordon was originally a third baseman, but subsequently moved to left field in 2010.)
School	The player's college when he won the award
Italics	Player was the first overall MLB draft pick in the same year
^	Player won the Rookie of the Year Award (Note: Won either in the same year or several years later.)
§	Player also won the Dick Howser Trophy in the same year
†	Member of the National College Baseball Hall of Fame
‡	Player is active (Note: A player is considered inactive if he has announced his retirement or not played for a full season.)

Winners
Year	Player	Position	School	Ref.
1978	Bob Horner^{†}^{^}	3B	Arizona State	
1979	Tim Wallach^{†}	3B	Cal State Fullerton	
1980	Terry Francona^{†}	1B	Arizona	
1981	Mike Fuentes	OF	Florida State	
1982	Augie Schmidt	SS	New Orleans	
1983	Dave Magadan^{†}	3B	Alabama	
1984	Oddibe McDowell^{†}	OF	Arizona State	
1985	Will Clark^{†}	1B	Mississippi State	
1986	Mike Loynd	P	Florida State	
1987	Jim Abbott^{†}	P	Michigan	
1988	Robin Ventura^{†}^{§}	3B	Oklahoma State	
1989	Ben McDonald^{†}	P	LSU	
1990	Alex Fernández^{§}	P	Miami-Dade Community College	
1991	Mike Kelly	OF	Arizona State	
1992	Phil Nevin	3B	Cal State Fullerton	
1993	Darren Dreifort^{†}	P	Wichita State	
1994	Jason Varitek^{§}	C	Georgia Tech	
1995	Mark Kotsay	OF	Cal State Fullerton	
1996	Travis Lee	1B	San Diego State	
1997	J. D. Drew^{§}	OF	Florida State	
1998	Pat Burrell	3B	Miami (FL)	
1999	Jason Jennings^{§}^{^}	P	Baylor	
2000	Kip Bouknight	P	South Carolina	
2001	Mark Prior^{§}	P	Southern California	
2002	Khalil Greene^{§}	SS	Clemson	
2003	Rickie Weeks^{§}	2B	Southern	
2004	Jered Weaver^{§}	P	Long Beach State	
2005	Alex Gordon^{§}	3B	Nebraska	
2006	Tim Lincecum	P	Washington	
2007	David Price^{§}	P	Vanderbilt	
2008	Buster Posey^{§}^{^}	C	Florida State	
2009	Stephen Strasburg^{§}	P	San Diego State	
2010	Bryce Harper^{‡}^{^}	C/OF	College of Southern Nevada	
2011	Trevor Bauer^{‡}	P	UCLA	
2012	Mike Zunino^{§}	C	Florida	
2013	Kris Bryant^{‡}^{§}^{^}	3B	San Diego	
2014	A. J. Reed^{§}	1B/P	Kentucky	
2015	Andrew Benintendi^{‡}^{§}	OF	Arkansas	
2016	Kyle Lewis^{‡}^	OF	Mercer	
2017	Brendan McKay^{‡}^{§}	1B / P	Louisville	
2018	Andrew Vaughn^{‡}	1B	California	
2019	Adley Rutschman^{‡}^{§}	C	Oregon State	
2020	Not awarded (Note: Due to the COVID-19 pandemic)	—	—	
2021	Kevin Kopps^{‡}^{§}	P	Arkansas	
2022	Ivan Melendez^{‡}^{§}	1B	Texas	
2023	Dylan Crews^{‡}	OF	LSU	
2024	Charlie Condon^{‡}^{§}	1B/OF	Georgia	
2025	Wehiwa Aloy^{‡}	SS	Arkansas	
2026	Daniel Jackson^{‡}^{§}	C	Georgia	

== Winners by School ==
Winners
School	Amount	Most Recent
Alabama	1	1983
Arizona	1	1980
Arizona State	3	1991
Arkansas	3	2025
Baylor	1	1999
Cal State Fullerton	3	1995
California	1	2018
Clemson	1	2002
Florida	1	2012
Florida State	4	2008
Georgia	2	2026
Georgia Tech	1	1994
Kentucky	1	2014
Long Beach State	1	2004
Louisville	1	2017
LSU	2	2023
Mercer	1	2016
Miami (FL)	1	1998
Miami-Dade College	1	1990
Michigan	1	1987
Mississippi State	1	1985
Nebraska	1	2005
New Orleans	1	1982
Oklahoma State	1	1988
Oregon State	1	2019
San Diego	1	2013
San Diego State	2	2009
South Carolina	1	2000
Southern	1	2003
USC	1	2001
Southern Nevada	1	2010
Texas	1	2022
UCLA	1	2011
Vanderbilt	1	2007
Washington	1	2006
Wichita State	1	1993

== See also ==
- List of college baseball awards
