= Kevin Kopps =

American baseball player (born 1997)

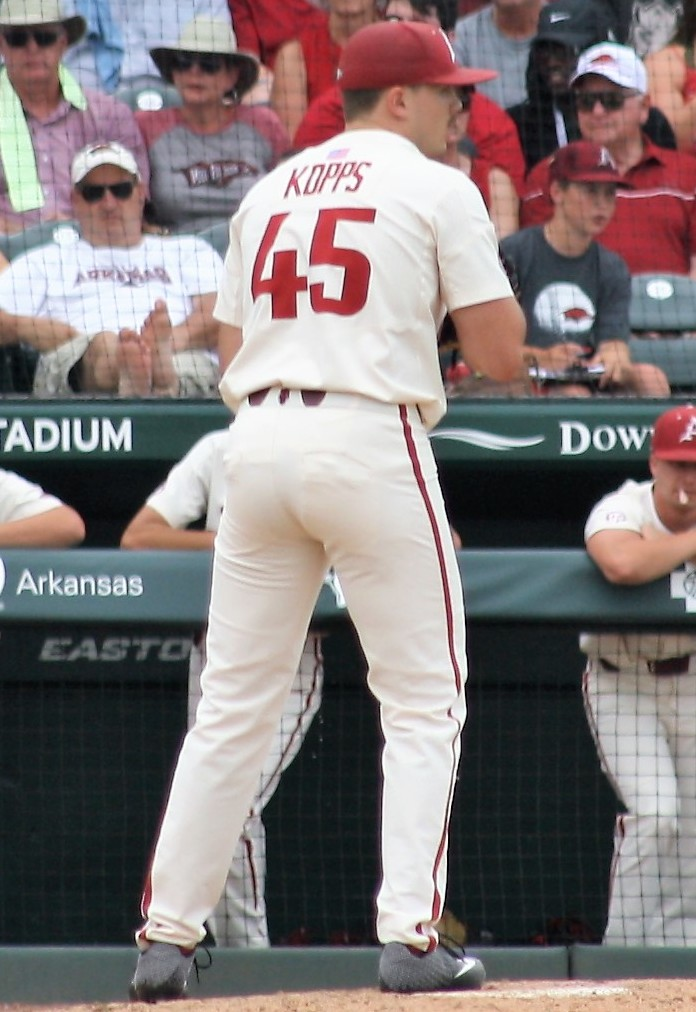
- Kopps with the Arkansas Razorbacks in 2019

Piratas de Campeche – No. 46
- Pitcher
- Born: March 2, 1997 (age 29); Sugar Land, Texas, U.S.
- Bats: Right Throws: Right
- Stats at Baseball Reference

Career highlights and awards
- Golden Spikes Award (2021); Dick Howser Trophy (2021); National Pitcher of the Year Award (2021); SEC Pitcher of the Year (2021)

Kevin Richard Kopps (born March 2, 1997) is an American professional baseball pitcher for the Piratas de Campeche of the Mexican League. He played college baseball for the Arkansas Razorbacks of the University of Arkansas, competing in the Southeastern Conference (SEC). In 2021, he won the Golden Spikes Award, the Dick Howser Trophy, National Pitcher of the Year Award, and Stopper of the Year Award.

== Amateur career ==
Kopps attended George Ranch High School in Fort Bend County, Texas. He played for the school's baseball team as a pitcher, and was twice named all-state. He enrolled at the University of Arkansas to play college baseball for the Arkansas Razorbacks in the Southeastern Conference (SEC). As a redshirt freshman in 2017, Kopps had a 3.31 earned run average (ERA) in 49 innings pitched. He did not play during the 2018 season as he recovered from Tommy John surgery. In 2019, his sophomore year, he had a 3.16 ERA in 37 innings pitched. As a junior in 2020, he had a 8.18 ERA in 11 innings pitched before the COVID-19 pandemic resulted in the cancellation of the remainder of the season.

After his poor 2020 season, Kopps was unsure if the Arkansas coaches wanted him on the team in 2021, but they assured him that they did. He reworked his pitching delivery to be more natural and less over-the-top based on how he was playing fetch with his dog. In 2021, his senior year, Kopps had a 12–1 win–loss record with a 0.90 ERA with 11 saves in 89 2/3 innings across 33 games. His ERA led all NCAA Division I pitchers. He was named the Southeastern Conference Baseball Pitcher of the Year. He won the Collegiate Baseball National Player of the Year Award, Stopper of the Year Award, the Dick Howser Trophy, and the Golden Spikes Award.

== Professional career ==
=== San Diego Padres ===
The San Diego Padres selected Kopps in the third round, with the 99th overall selection, of the 2021 Major League Baseball draft. Kopps later signed with the Padres and received a $300,000 signing bonus. Kopps made his professional debut with the Fort Wayne TinCaps of High-A Central. In September 2021, the Padres promoted Kopps to the San Antonio Missions of Double-A South. Over 14 2/3 innings between the two teams, he went 1-0 with a 0.61 ERA and 22 strikeouts.

In 2022, the Padres invited Kopps to spring training as a non-roster player. He opened the season with San Antonio.

The Padres released Kopps on March 17, 2026.

=== Piratas de Campeche ===
On May 15, 2026, Kopps signed with the Piratas de Campeche of the Mexican League.

== Personal life ==
At Arkansas, Kopps earned a bachelor's degree in biomedical engineering and has completed coursework towards a Master of Business Administration. Kopps' sister, Ashley, played softball for Sam Houston State University.
