= Arkansas Razorbacks baseball statistical leaders =

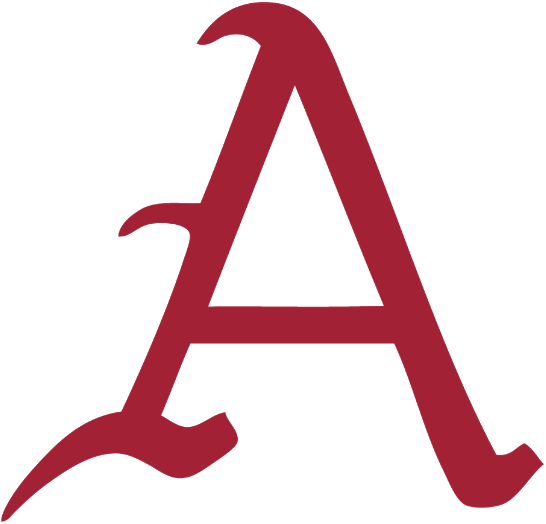

The Arkansas Razorbacks baseball statistical leaders are individual statistical leaders of the Arkansas Razorbacks baseball program in various categories, including batting average, home runs, runs batted in, runs, hits, stolen bases, ERA, and Strikeouts. Within those areas, the lists identify single-game, single-season, and career leaders. The Razorbacks represent the University of Arkansas in the NCAA's Southeastern Conference.

Arkansas began competing in intercollegiate baseball in 1897. These lists are updated through the end of the 2025 season.

== Batting Average ==
Career (MIN. 300 AB)
Rk	Player	AVG	Seasons
1	Matt Erickson	.377	1995 1996 1997
2	Dave Patterson	.373	1985 1986
3	Jeff King	.372	1984 1985 1986
4	Andy Skeels	.358	1986 1987
5	Randy Bobb	.356	1987 1988
6	Zack Cox	.355	2009 2010
7	Jeff Hoefler	.350	2000 2001
8	Mark Johnson	.349	1990 1991
9	Ryan Hinske	.348	1996 1997 1998
10	Heston Kjerstad	.343	2018 2019 2020
	Scott Loseke	.343	1982 1983

Season (MIN. 95 AB)
Rk	Player	AVG	Season
1	Zack Cox	.429	2010
2	Jeremy Jackson	.425	1997
3	Bill Dorothy	.417	1969
4	Matt Erickson	.398	1997
5	Ryan Lundquist	.397	1997
	Ralph Kraus	.397	1986
7	Jim Kremers	.393	1987
8	Matt Erickson	.391	1996
9	Greg D'Alexander	.387	1990
	Dave Patterson	.387	1986

== Home Runs ==
Career
Rk	Player	HR	Seasons
1	Danny Hamblin	57	2004 2005 2006 2007
2	Ryan Lundquist	56	1996 1997 1998 1999
3	Brett Eibner	42	2008 2009 2010
	Andy Wilkins	42	2008 2009 2010
	Jeff King	42	1984 1985 1986
6	Brady Slavens	39	2021 2022 2023
	Brian Kirby	39	1998 1999 2000 2001
8	Heston Kjerstad	37	2018 2019 2020
9	Ryder Helfrick	36	2024 2025 2026
10	Rodney Nye	35	1998 1999
	Greg D'Alexander	35	1987 1988 1989 1990
	Wehiwa Aloy	35	2024 2025
	Camden Kozeal	35	2025 2026

Season
Rk	Player	HR	Season
1	Ryan Lundquist	24	1997
2	Brett Eibner	22	2010
	Danny Hamblin	22	2007
4	Wehiwa Aloy	21	2025
5	Andrew Benintendi	20	2015
	Chad Spanberger	20	2017
	Rodney Nye	20	1999
	Camden Kozeal	20	2026
9	Andy Wilkins	19	2009
	Ryan Fox	19	2003

Single Game
Rk	Player	HR	Season	Opponent
1	Chad Spanberger	3	2017	Auburn
	Brett Eibner	3	2010	Grambling State
	Tim Smalling	3	2008	Ole Miss
	Aaron Murphree	3	2008	Siena
	Danny Hamblin	3	2005	Oral Roberts
	Rodney Nye	3	1999	South Carolina
	Ryan Lundquist	3	1997	Central Missouri State
	Scott Epps	3	1992	SMS
	Kevin McReynolds	3	1980	TCU
	Greg Snowden	3	1974	Rice

== Runs Batted In ==
Career
Rk	Player	RBI	Seasons
1	Ryan Lundquist	233	1996 1997 1998 1999
2	Danny Hamblin	219	2004 2005 2006 2007
3	Jeff King	204	1984 1985 1986
4	Greg D'Alexander	184	1987 1988 1989 1990
5	Troy Eklund	180	1986 1987 1988 1989
6	Eric Hinske	173	1996 1997 1998
	Jim Kremers	173	1985 1986 1987 1988
8	Andy Wilkins	165	2008 2009 2010
	Brian Kirby	165	1998 1999 2000 2001
10	Brady Slavens	163	2021 2022 2023

Season
Rk	Player	RBI	Season
1	Jeff King	82	1985
2	Rodney Nye	78	1999
	Ryan Lundquist	78	1997
4	Eric Hinske	76	1997
	Jim Kremers	76	1987
	Andy Skeels	76	1987
7	Jeremy Jackson	72	1997
8	Camden Kozeal	71	2026
	Brett Eibner	71	2010
	Casey Coon	71	2007
	Eric Hinske	71	1998

Single Game
Rk	Player	RBI	Season	Opponent
1	Ryan Lundquist	9	1997	Central Missouri State

== Runs ==
Career
Rk	Player	R	Seasons
1	Ryan Lundquist	241	1996 1997 1998 1999
2	Jack Welsh	212	1997 1998 1999 2000
3	Kenderick Moore	204	1992 1993 1994 1995 1996
4	Danny Hamblin	202	2004 2005 2006 2007
5	Allen Williams	193	1991 1992 1993 1994
6	Matt Erickson	188	1995 1996 1997
7	Jake Dugger	182	2004 2005 2006 2007
	Troy Eklund	182	1986 1987 1988 1989
9	Eric Hinske	178	1996 1997 1998
	Jeff King	178	1984 1985 1986

Season
Rk	Player	R	Season
1	Eric Hinske	87	1997
2	Matt Erickson	86	1997
3	Ryan Lundquist	83	1997
4	Wehiwa Aloy	81	2025
5	Jason McConnell	78	1996
6	Joe Jester	76	1999
7	Trevor Ezell	72	2019
	Dave Patterson	72	1986
9	Jason McConnell	71	1997
	Scott Loseke	71	1983
	Charles Davalan	71	2025

Single Game
Rk	Player	R	Season	Opponent
1	Trevor Ezell	6	2019	Grambling State
	Jeremy Jackson	6	1997	Northeastern (Okla.) State
	Todd Zacher	6	1981	Western Michigan

== Hits ==
Career
Rk	Player	H	Seasons
1	Ryan Lundquist	288	1996 1997 1998 1999
2	Danny Hamblin	284	2004 2005 2006 2007
3	Kenderick Moore	282	1992 1993 1994 1995 1996
4	Matt Erickson	260	1995 1996 1997
5	Allen Williams	247	1991 1992 1993 1994
6	Ralph Kraus	245	1983 1984 1985 1986
7	Greg D'Alexander	243	1987 1988 1989 1990
8	Jake Dugger	242	2004 2005 2006 2007
9	Jeff King	237	1984 1985 1986
10	Jack Welsh	229	1997 1998 1999 2000

Season
Rk	Player	H	Season
1	Zack Cox	102	2010
2	Matt Erickson	97	1996
3	Matt Erickson	94	1997
	Jeremy Jackson	94	1997
	Jim Kremers	94	1987
6	Jeff King	93	1985
	Wehiwa Aloy	93	2025
	Charles Davalan	93	2025
9	Ryan Lundquist	92	1997
10	Andy Skeels	91	1987
	Ralph Kraus	91	1986
	Dave Patterson	91	1986

Single Game
Rk	Player	H	Season	Opponent
1	Jeremy Jackson	6	1997	Northeastern (Okla.) State
	Jason McConnell	6	1997	Vanderbilt
	Kenderick Moore	6	1995	Alabama
	Jeff King	6	1984	Houston

== Stolen Bases ==
Career
Rk	Player	SB	Seasons
1	Kenderick Moore	95	1992 1993 1994 1995 1996
2	Scott Bridges	72	2002 2003 2004 2005
3	Allen Williams	71	1991 1992 1993 1994
4	Scott Pose	68	1987 1988 1989
5	Jeff Houck	65	1990 1991 1992 1993
6	Jeff Parsons	63	1993 1994 1995
7	Scott Loseke	57	1982 1983
8	Collin Kuhn	50	2009 2010 2011
	Jack Welsh	50	1997 1998 1999 2000

Season
Rk	Player	SB	Season
1	Scott Loseke	42	1983
2	Joe Jester	35	1999
	Gary Jones	35	1982
4	Jeff Parsons	32	1995
5	Kenderick Moore	29	1996
	Allen Williams	29	1992
7	Ty Bilderback	28	1995
	Scott Pose	28	1989
9	Jim Ward	27	1984
10	Kenderick Moore	26	1995
	Mark Johnson	26	1990
	Dan Campbell	26	1987

Single Game
Rk	Player	SB	Season	Opponent
1	Logan Forsythe	4	2007	Ole Miss
	Scott Pose	4	1988	Missouri Southern
	Jim Ward	4	1984	Eastern Illinois
	Shaun Lacey	4	1978	North Texas State

== Earned Run Average ==
Career (MIN. 100 IP)
Rk	Player	ERA	Seasons
1	Phillip Stidham	1.62	1989 1990 1991
2	Steve Krueger	1.66	1979 1980
3	Jalen Beeks	2.05	2013 2014
4	Barrett Astin	2.11	2011 2012 2013
5	Tim Lollar	2.17	1977 1978
6	Zach Jackson	2.28	2014 2015
7	David Rhodes	2.35	1977 1978
8	Ryne Stanek	2.55	2011 2012 2013
9	Kevin Kopps	2.59	2017 2018 2019 2020 2021
10	Chris Oliver	2.64	2012 2013 2014

Season (MIN. 45 IP)
Rk	Player	ERA	Season
1	Kevin Kopps	0.90	2021
2	Phillip Stidham	0.95	1990
3	Phillip Stidham	1.20	1991
4	Ryne Stanek	1.39	2013
5	Tim Brewer	1.49	1973
6	Boyd Goodner	1.50	2004
7	DJ Baxendale	1.58	2011
8	Steve Krueger	1.59	1980
9	Steve Krueger	1.73	1979
10	Barrett Astin	1.79	2013

== Strikeouts ==
Career
Rk	Player	K	Seasons
1	Hagen Smith	360	2022 2023 2024
2	Nick Schmidt	345	2005 2006 2007
3	Matt Carnes	301	1995 1996 1997
4	David Walling	283	1998 1999
5	Scott Tabor	261	1979 1980 1981 1982
6	Blaine Knight	244	2016 2017 2018
7	Gabe Gaeckle	236	2024 2025 2026
8	Kevin Kopps	232	2017 2018 2019 2020 2021
9	Charley Boyce	229	2003 2004 2005 2006
10	Gerald Hannahs	225	1971 1972 1973 1974

Season
Rk	Player	K	Season
1	Hagen Smith	161	2024
2	David Walling	155	1999
3	Nick Schmidt	145	2006
4	Kevin Kopps	131	2021
	Hunter Dietz	131	2026
6	Jess Todd	128	2007
	David Walling	128	1998
8	Zach Root	126	2025
9	Isaiah Campbell	125	2019
10	Trevor Stephan	120	2017

Single Game
Rk	Player	K	Season	Opponent
1	Gage Wood	19	2025	Murray State
2	Hagen Smith	17	2024	Oregon State
	Jess Todd	17	2007	South Carolina
