= Arkansas Razorbacks baseball =

Baseball team representing the University of Arkansas

Arkansas Razorbacks
- 2026 Arkansas Razorbacks baseball team
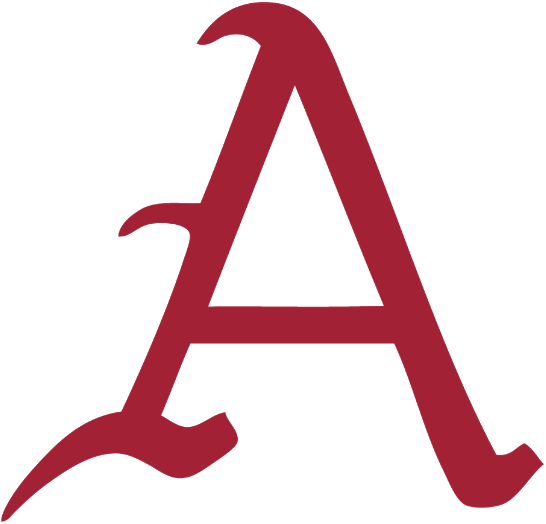
- Founded: 1897; 129 years ago
- Overall record: 2,486–1,492–6 (.625)
- University: University of Arkansas
- Athletic director: Hunter Yurachek
- Head coach: Dave Van Horn (24th season)
- Conference: SEC
- Location: Fayetteville, Arkansas
- Home stadium: Baum–Walker Stadium at George Cole Field (capacity: 11,121)
- Nickname: Razorbacks
- Colors: Cardinal and white

College World Series runner-up
- 1979, 2018

College World Series appearances
- 1979, 1985, 1987, 1989, 2004, 2009, 2012, 2015, 2018, 2019, 2022, 2025

NCAA regional champions
- 1979, 1985, 1987, 1989, 2002, 2004, 2009, 2010, 2012, 2015, 2018, 2019, 2021, 2022, 2025

NCAA tournament appearances
- 1973, 1979, 1980, 1983, 1985, 1986, 1987, 1988, 1989, 1990, 1995, 1996, 1998, 1999, 2002, 2003, 2004, 2005, 2006, 2007, 2008, 2009, 2010, 2011, 2012, 2013, 2014, 2015, 2017, 2018, 2019, 2021, 2022, 2023, 2024, 2025, 2026

Conference tournament champions
- 1985, 2021

Conference regular season champions
- 1989, 1990, 1999, 2004, 2021, 2023

Conference division regular season champions
- 1999, 2004, 2007, 2011, 2018, 2019, 2021, 2023, 2024

The University of Arkansas Razorbacks baseball team is a member of the National Collegiate Athletic Association (NCAA) and the Southeastern Conference (SEC), and is coached by Dave Van Horn. The program started in 1897, and is in its 104th season of play (79th consecutive) in 2026. Arkansas is one of only four schools in the SEC to turn a profit from its baseball program in recent years, along with SEC rivals LSU, Mississippi State and Ole Miss.

The Razorbacks have been to 32 NCAA tournaments and twelve College World Series: 1979, 1985, 1987, 1989, 2004, 2009, 2012, 2015, 2018, 2019, 2022, 2025.

== Venue ==
The Razorbacks play baseball home games in Baum-Walker Stadium at George Cole Field, which holds 11,749. Arkansas was the first program in the nation to have an average attendance over 8,000 for the course of the season. Baum Stadium has hosted NCAA regionals in 1999, 2004, 2006, 2007, 2010, 2017, 2018, 2019, 2021 and 2023. The Arkansas baseball team also hosted an NCAA Super Regional in 2004 against Florida State, in 2015 against Missouri State, in 2018 against South Carolina, in 2019 against Ole Miss, in 2021 against North Carolina State, and again in 2025 against Tennessee. One of the games in the 2015 Super Regional series against Missouri State set the all-time stadium attendance mark at 12,167. The first game of the South Carolina Super Regional series had 11, 722 in attendance making it the 3rd highest attended game in Baum stadium history. Baum stadium was voted top ballpark in collegiate baseball by Baseball America, 20 years after claiming the top spot in a 1998 poll.

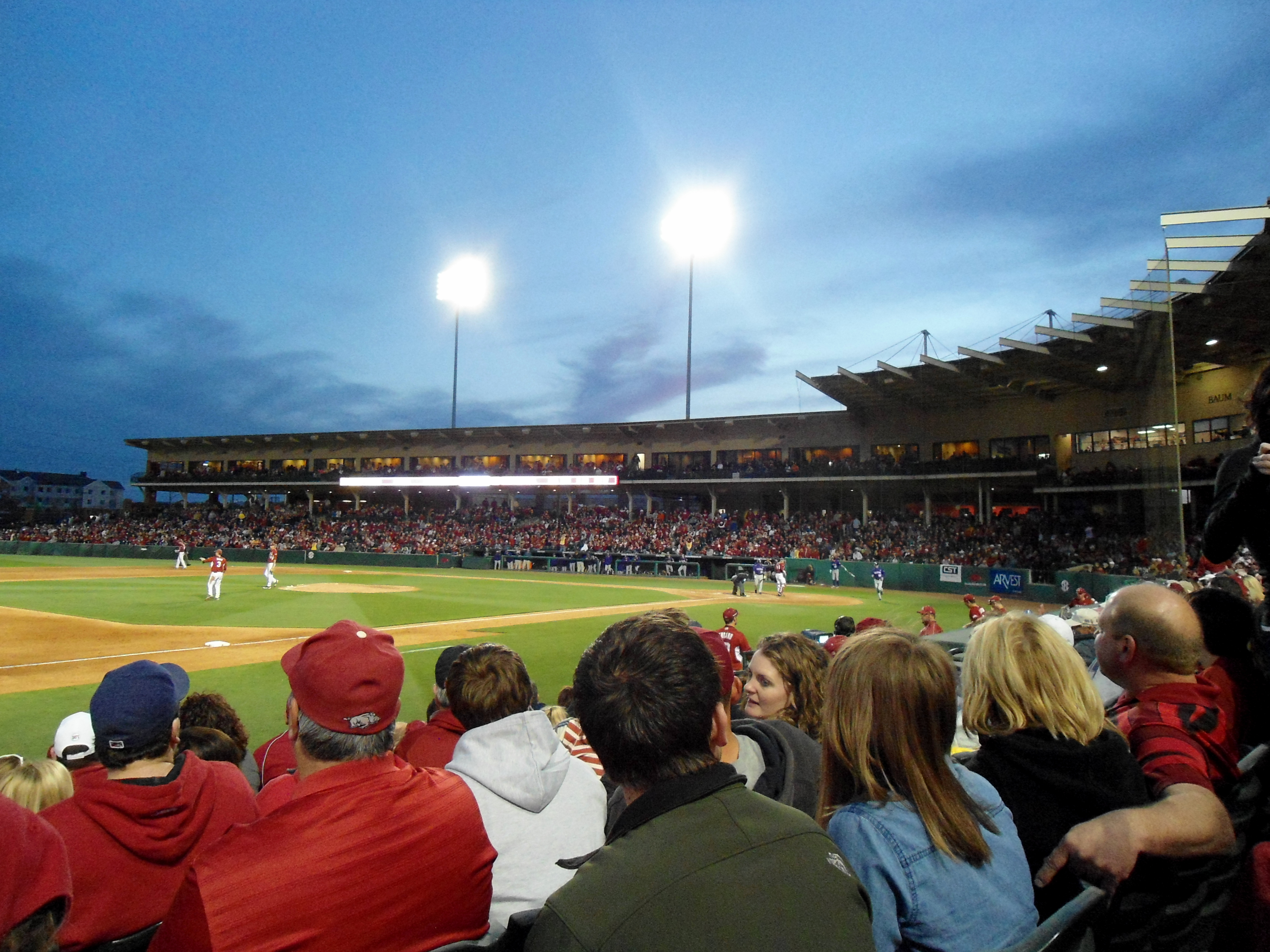
A game in progress in Baum Stadium, April 2013

In 2007, Arkansas led the nation in attendance, with 8,069 attendees per game, over 700 more per game than second-place LSU. Mississippi State, another SEC school, was third with an average of 6,795 per game.

Before Baum Stadium was built, the Razorbacks played on the original George Cole Field from 1975 to 1995, named for former all-conference quarterback, shortstop and athletic director George Cole. The field was next to John McDonnell Field, home of the outdoor track and field team, and has since been turned into the practice field for the football team.

== History ==
Arkansas first fielded a baseball team from 1897 to 1930. The modern era of Razorbacks baseball began in 1947, under Deke Brackett. Bill Ferrell led the team from 1950 to 1965, and Wayne Robbins took over from 1966 to 1969.

In 1970, Cole hired 28-year-old Norm DeBriyn after another man took the job but resigned after only one day. DeBriyn inherited a program that played at a dilapidated stadium at the Washington County Fairgrounds, and whose paperwork was contained in a single manila folder. He immediately set about upgrading the program. Within three years, he had the Razorbacks in the NCAA tournament for the first time in school history. He then persuaded athletic director Frank Broyles to build a new on-campus stadium, George Cole Field. Arkansas' baseball program has won six conference championships, two in the Southwest Conference in 1989 and 1990, and four in the Southeastern Conference in 1999, 2004, 2021, and 2023. They have also won two conference tournament titles, the first in 1985 as a member of the SWC, the second in 2021 in the SEC. In addition to those championships, the Razorbacks have also won nine SEC West Division championships in 1999, 2004, 2007, 2011, 2018, 2019, 2021, 2023, and 2024. In Arkansas' eleven College World Series appearances they have finished as national runners-up twice, in 1979 and 2018.

=== 1979 College World Series ===
DeBriyn's 10th team put the Razorbacks on the national map. The Razorbacks won 49 games, lost 15, and finished second in the Southwest Conference (SWC). The Hogs defeated George Washington, Florida, and Delaware twice to move out of the East Regional (played at Seminole Stadium in Tallahassee, Florida). The Razorbacks then went to Omaha and defeated Pepperdine, 5–4 and an Arizona Wildcats club, with a young Terry Francona, 10–3. A match-up with SWC champion Texas loomed next for the Razorbacks. The Hogs had gone 1–4 against the Longhorns up to this point in the season. The Razorbacks prevailed, 9–4, and earned a contest with Cal State Fullerton for a championship. Texas was eliminated. Arkansas lost twice to the Titans, 13–10, and 2–1, to give the trophy to Cal State Fullerton. Freshman Kevin McReynolds was named to the all-tournament team as an outfielder, along with Steve Krueger at pitcher, Larry Wallace at shortstop, and Marc Brumble as an outfielder.

=== 1985 College World Series ===
Arkansas came into the South regional hot winning twelve straight games (last loss against fellow CWS team Mississippi State), and winning the SWC tournament with the help of tourney-MVP Dave Patterson. A 20–13 victory over Eastern Kentucky started things off on the right foot for the Hogs. Wins against George Mason, hometown FSU, and Georgia Tech would push the Hogs to their second College World Series.

Arkansas arrived in Omaha in as dramatic fashion as they left it. The Diamond Hogs defeated the Gamecocks of South Carolina in a 14 inning affair, 1–0, but Arkansas would lose to Mississippi State three days later, and fall to the loser's bracket. Facing elimination, the Razorbacks crushed Stanford 10–4, eliminating the Cardinal from the College World Series. Now a win away from the Championship series with Miami (Fl), Arkansas had to face Southwest Conference rival Texas.

Said Razorback third baseman Jeff King of Texas, "We figured we would meet them again." The Hogs were 4–1 against the Longhorns in 1985, including two wins in the Southwest Conference Tournament. Arkansas lead the game 7–0, but the Longhorns battled back and sent the game to extra innings. Texas' Bill Bates hit a leadoff triple in the bottom of the tenth inning with the score tied 7–7. Arkansas coach Norm DeBriyn opted to intentionally walk the bases full and pull the infield in. Doug Hodo then hit a single past the infielders, allowing Bates to score and the Horns to move on, 8–7 in ten innings. The situation was oddly similar to the last time the Hogs reached the College World Series, except Texas was 4–1 against the Hogs in 1979 (including two SWC tournament wins), and Arkansas prevailed in the 1979 CWS match up.

Freshman third baseman Jeff King and junior outfielder Ralph Kraus were named to the All-College World Series team.

=== 1987 College World Series ===
Arkansas was 51–16 in 1987, and finished in fifth place at the CWS. The Hogs finished second in both the SWC regular season and postseason tournament. The Regional was played in Huntsville, Alabama, and the Razorbacks defeated Middle Tennessee, West Virginia, and Clemson (twice) in order to play in Omaha. Texas, who Arkansas had gone a lowly 1–4 against during the season and now was ranked #1 nationally, loomed in a Rosenblatt Stadium showdown.

Texas defeated Arkansas, 13–6, but Arkansas rebounded with a win against future SEC foe Georgia, eliminating the Bulldogs. Georgia was led by pitcher Derek Lilliquist (14–2), who had 19 HR and 60 RBI entering Omaha. Another future SEC opponent was on the horizon, this time in the form of Tigers from LSU. The Tigers came out on top, 5–2, but were eliminated two days later, with Texas eliminated a day later.

=== 1989 College World Series ===
Ten years after the successful 1979 campaign, the Razorbacks were again headed to Omaha. First, the 51–16 Razorbacks played their way through the Northwest Regional, losing first to Le Moyne before defeating George Washington, Illinois, Arizona State, and Le Moyne to move to the College World Series.

Once in the College World Series, the Diamond Hogs met Wichita State. The Shockers had actually been defeated by the Razorbacks 5–1 in Fayetteville, which was the Razorbacks' first game of the season. Arkansas lost 3–1 on June 2, and had to stave off elimination against North Carolina. The Tar Heels were eliminated, and Arkansas had another shot at the Shockers, who had lost to Florida State and was now fighting to remain in Omaha, as one more loss would eliminate them.

Wichita State defeated Norm DeBriyn's Razorbacks, 8–4, eliminating them. The finish was good for fifth place in the CWS. Wichita State would go on to win the National Championship, fighting off elimination three times more. Six of the 11 all-CWS team were members of the Wichita State Shockers, including Eric Wedge. Arkansas Razorbacks outfielder Troy Eklund was elected to the All-American team.

=== 2004 ===
Arkansas won the SEC Western Division, a portion of the SEC crown, and visited the College World Series again in 2004.

==== 2004 SEC tournament ====
The Hogs were picked to finish last in the SEC, but instead was the #1 seed in the SEC Tournament. The Diamond Hogs lost to Luke Hochevar and the Volunteers of Tennessee, 6–8 in 13 innings. Kyle Norrid of Tennessee hit a three-run double in the 12th inning, but the Hogs returned with four straight singles to keep the game going. Chris Kemp hit a game-winning double the next inning, and Craig Cobb retired the Razorbacks to earn the save. The game was the third of the day to extend into extra innings. The Hogs then defeated Ole Miss and Tennessee by the counts of 4–3 and 4–1 respectively, before losing to South Carolina, 2–3. Arkansas went into the ninth down 3–0, and loaded the bases with no outs. Jake Dugger drove in a run with a single. Following a strikeout, Brett Hagedorn added to the Razorbacks score with a sacrifice fly. Scott Hode grounded out for out number three, and the rally fell short. The Gamecocks would win the championship by defeating Vanderbilt. Arkansas finished third in the SEC tournament.

==== 2004 College World Series ====
The Razorbacks began play in their home stadium in the Fayetteville Regional. Arkansas defeated Le Moyne first, but lost to Wichita State 4–1. The Razorbacks had not seen the last of the Shockers, though, and after a 10–7 win over Missouri, defeated them two times on June 6, 2004, to advance to the Super Regionals.

Arkansas had to play Florida State twice to move on to Omaha, but the games were again at Baum Stadium. The Diamond Hogs prevailed, 7–4 and 4–2 and went on to Omaha.

Arkansas was an eight seed in 2004, and for the fourth time in five Hog appearances, Arkansas' first game in Omaha was against the Texas Longhorns. #1 Texas prevailed 13–2, and the Razorbacks were one loss from elimination. The Arizona Wildcats would bump the Razorbacks from Rosenblatt Stadium in their next game, 7–2.

=== 2009 College World Series ===
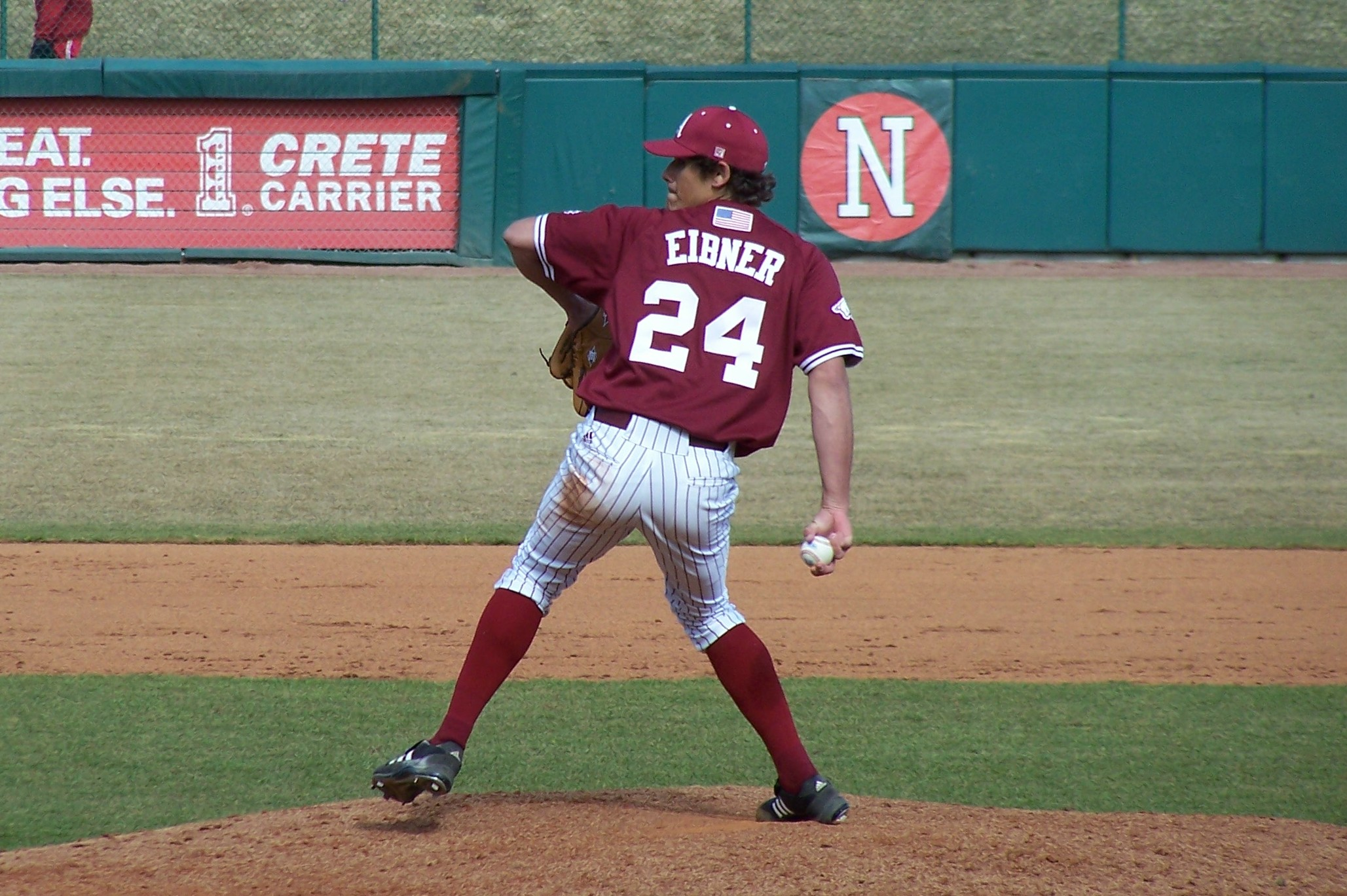
Brett Eibner's ninth-inning home run against Virginia in the 2009 College World Series was one of the most memorable Razorback home runs.

Arkansas began hot in 2009, starting the year at 10–2 including back-to-back wins over #1 Arizona State that set Baum Stadium attendance records. The Hogs luck changed entering SEC play, as they dropped series against Vanderbilt, Georgia, and LSU, and were swept by Alabama and Ole Miss to end the year. Limping into the 2009 SEC baseball tournament, the Hogs defeated Florida twice, but were bumped from the tournament by Vanderbilt. The Razorbacks were the #2 seed in the Norman Regional, hosted by the Oklahoma Sooners.

The Hogs defeated Washington State in game 1 in Norman, setting up a match up with #9 Oklahoma, who the Hogs had beaten at home a month earlier on a Brett Eibner walk-off bases-loaded walk. Arkansas collected 20 hits in a 17–6 win over the Sooners, setting up super regional berth with another win. Razorback Andy Wilkins went 5–5 in the following game with two doubles, two home runs, four runs scored and five RBI in an 11–0 rout. The win pushed the Hogs to a meeting with Florida State in Dick Howser Stadium.

The Hogs last met Florida State in the 2004 Fayetteville Super Regional, with the Hogs advancing to Omaha. Arkansas scored five runs in the last three innings to win game 1, and Andrew Darr propelled the Hogs to the College World Series on his two-run walk-off double in the bottom of the ninth.

The Razorbacks opened the College World Series in game 1 against #1 national seed Cal State Fullerton. Dallas Keuchel pitched well, with Zack Cox and Andy Wilkins both homering in a resounding 10–6 win. The win set a rematch with LSU, who had beaten Arkansas in a hard-fought series earlier in the year. LSU got a first-inning home run from pitcher Brett Eibner, and the Hogs bats fell silent in a 9–1 loss. Both fighting for their tournament lives, Arkansas met Virginia in an elimination game. The Razorbacks offense was again quiet, and the Hogs were down to their last strike when Brett Eibner homered to keep the Razorbacks in Omaha. The Hogs would prevail after another timely Andrew Darr double in the tenth inning. A rematch with LSU sat on the horizon, and the drained Arkansas pitching staff struggled. Closer Stephen Richards started the game for the Hogs, who were losing 4–0 by the third inning. After an error and a wild pitch, the Razorbacks gave up runs in six separate innings, and lost 14–5. The Hogs finished tied with Arizona State (who Arkansas defeated twice in the regular season) for third place.

=== 2012 College World Series ===
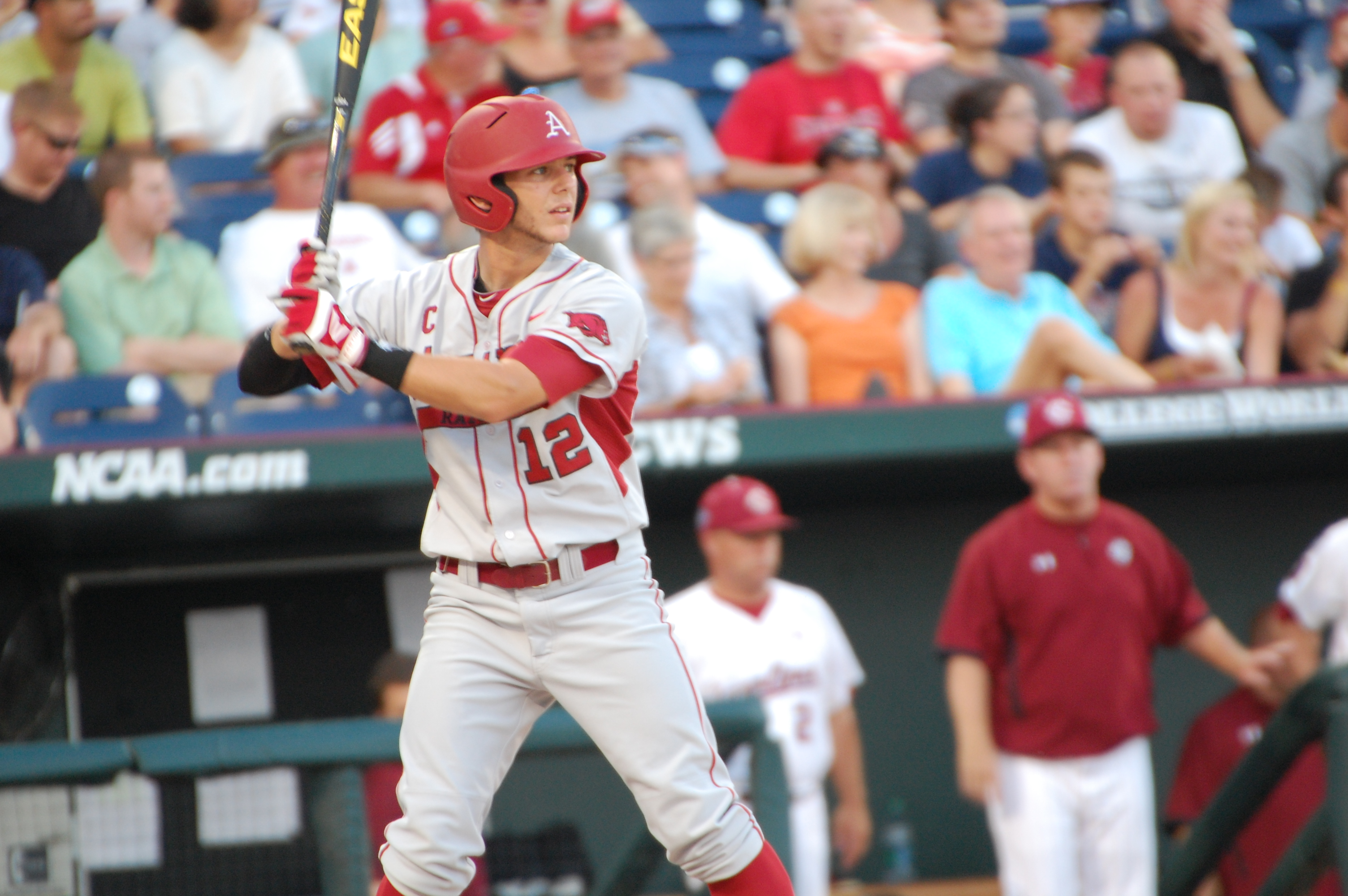
Bo Bigham bats for Arkansas at the 2012 College World Series.

Arkansas began the 2012 season with high expectations, including a consensus top ten ranking and D. J. Baxendale, Nolan Sanburn, Dominic Ficociello, and Ryne Stanek receiving preseason All-America honors. The team began the season playing well in non-conference games, and finished with a 16–14 SEC record. After a quick two losses at the SEC tournament, it was announced the Hogs would play in the Houston Regional, hosted by Rice University. Arkansas defeated the Sam Houston State Bearkats twice and Rice once to advance to the Waco, Texas, Super Regional against Baylor. The Razorbacks dropped the first game to Baylor, 8–1. Facing elimination, Arkansas won game 2 after consecutive hit by pitches with the bases loaded gave the Hogs the tying and winning runs. Arkansas won game 3 when Jake Wise drove in Brian Anderson with a double in the 10th inning, pushing across the game's only run and sending the Hogs to Omaha.

Arkansas won their first game of the 2012 College World Series, an 8–1 victory over Kent State Golden Flashes. D. J. Baxendale pitched into the seventh inning, with Joe Serrano, Brian Anderson, Bo Bigham, and Jake Wise all collecting multiple hits. Two nights later the Razorbacks faced SEC foe and two-time defending champion the South Carolina Gamecocks, who came into the game with a 22-game postseason win streak. A Dominic Ficociello RBI in the first inning gave Arkansas a 1–0 lead, as they never trailed, winning a 2–1 pitcher's duel. Stanek pitched six innings, allowing just one run on three hits. Reliever Barrett Astin pitched the final three innings allowing no runs, and just one hit.

=== 2015 College World Series ===
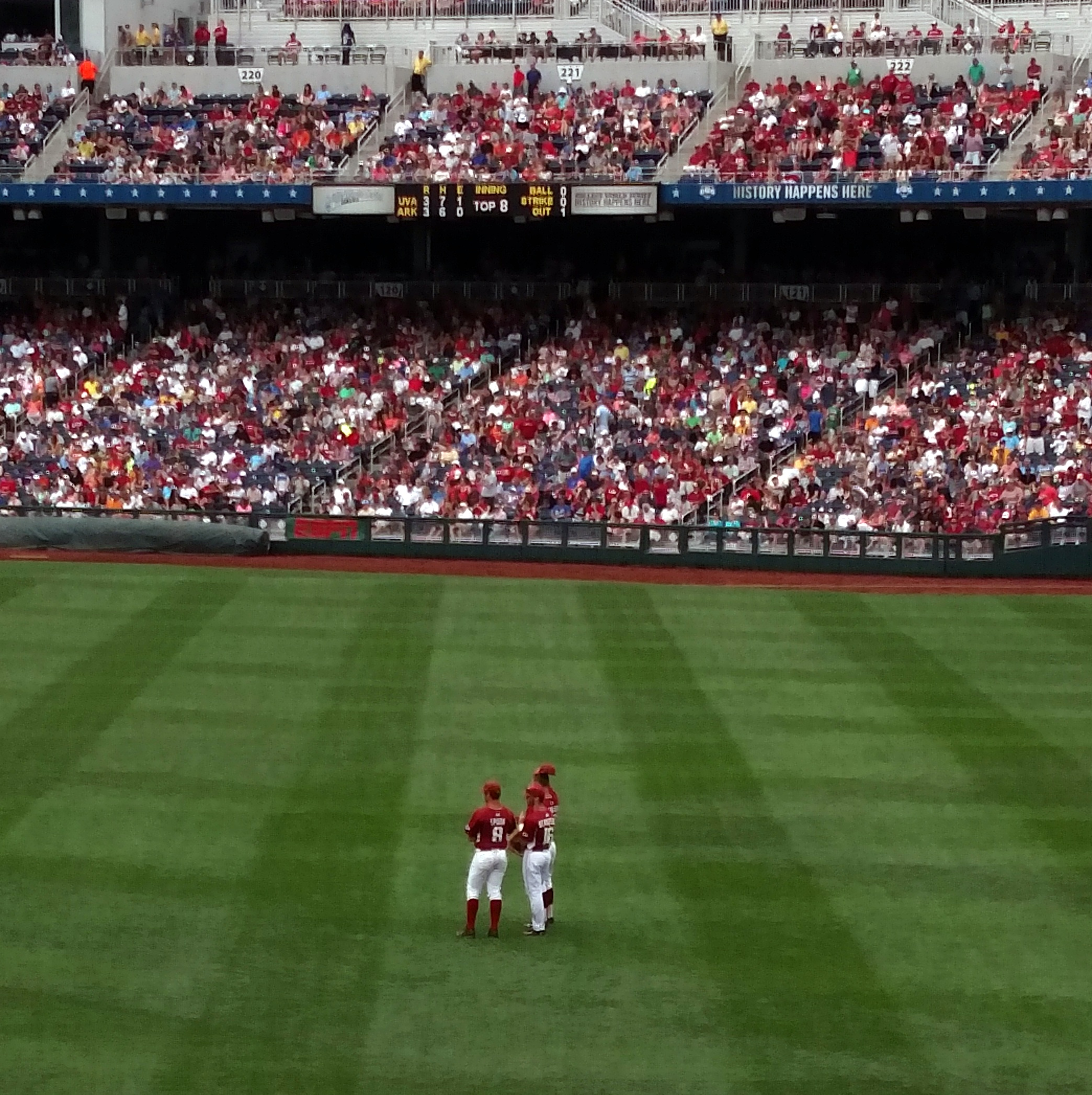
Outfielders Tyler Spoon, Andrew Benintendi and Joe Serrano at TD Ameritrade Park

Arkansas was not expected to make it to the College World Series in 2015, especially after a slow start to the season left the Razorbacks sitting at .500 heading into April. But the Razorbacks caught fire behind SEC and national player of the year Andrew Benintendi and won both the Stillwater Regional and Fayetteville Super Regional to advance to Omaha for the eighth time and fourth time under Van Horn.

In the first game, Arkansas got a stellar pitching performance from Trey Killian, but normally lights-out closer Zach Jackson didn't have his best stuff and Virginia came back and forced the Razorbacks into an elimination game, beating them 5–3.

Arkansas then faced No. 5 national seed Miami, and fell behind 2–0 when Jacob Heyward hit a 2-run shot off reliever Jackson Lowery, who had just been inserted for Keaton McKinney. The Razorbacks rallied twice to tie the game at 2–2 and 3–3, but lost 4–3 when Heyward hit a walk-off single. It was the first time since 2004 that they failed to win a game in Omaha.

=== 2018 College World Series ===
The Razorbacks entered Omaha with a 44–19 record, co-champions of the SEC West with Ole Miss, and having won the Fayetteville Regional and Super Regional at home in Baum Stadium. The team set a school record for home wins, going 34–4 at Baum. Beginning the year as a top ten team, the Razorbacks never left that spot throughout the season. Arkansas previously played four of the other seven teams in Omaha, compiling a 4–5 record against them prior to the CWS.

Arkansas defeated Texas in its opening game 11–5 behind pitcher Blaine Knight, who improved to 13–0 on the year. A three-hour rain delay marred the contest. It then went on to beat Texas Tech 7–4 in a game pushed back a day because of weather, and then eliminated defending national champion Florida 5–2 to earn a spot in the championship series against Oregon State. Arkansas won the first game of the championship series 4–1, but Oregon State completed a comeback 5–3 win in game two thanks in large part to a dropped foul ball by Arkansas with two outs in the 9th inning. The Oregon State batter hit a home run two pitches later to win the game, and the Beavers would win decisively in game three, 5–0. The game two loss is considered one of the most heart-breaking losses in program history.

== Postseason appearances ==
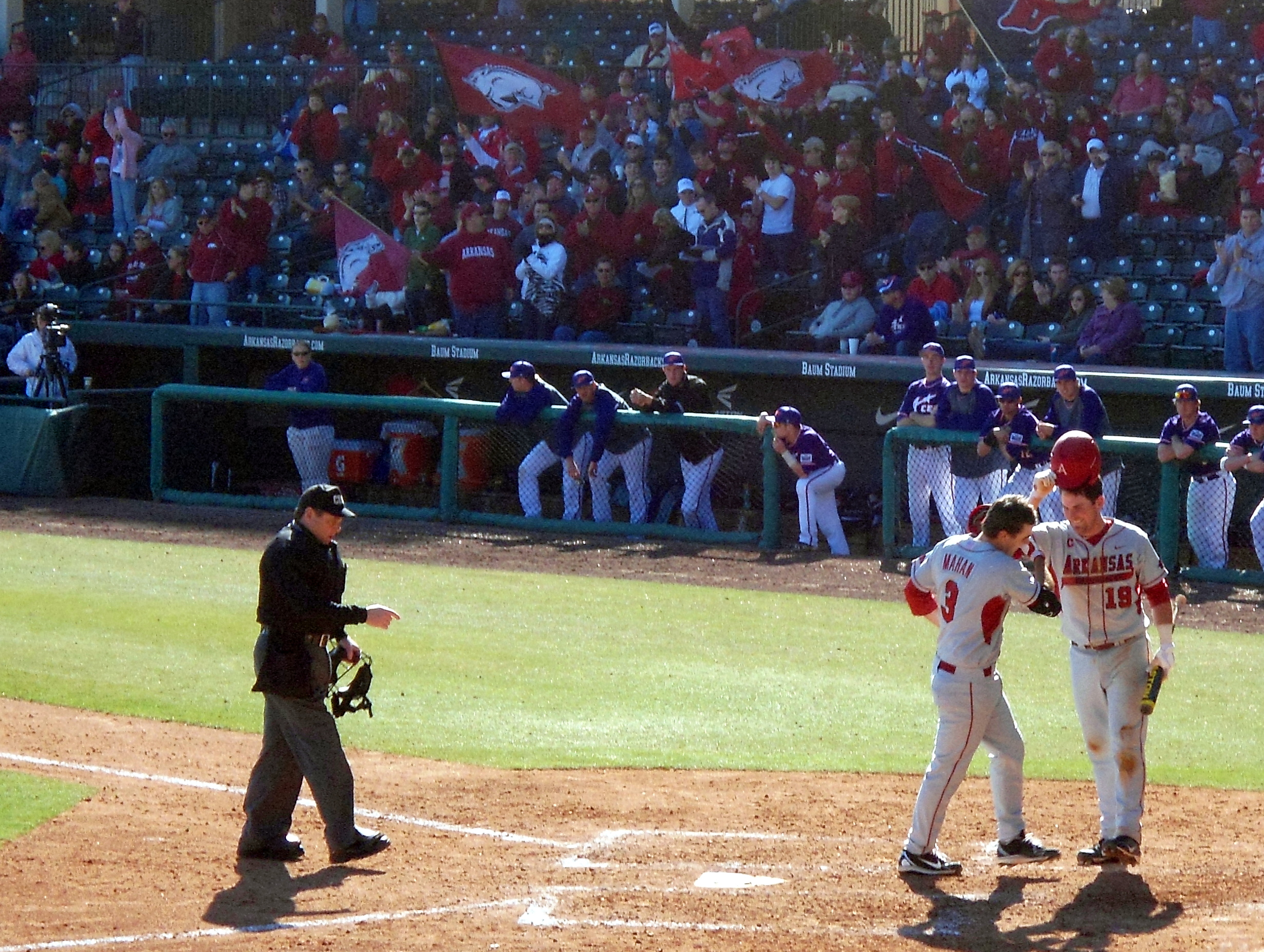
Jacob Mahan celebrates a home run with Jake Wise

=== Conference Tournaments ===
Year	Site	Record	%	Notes
1977	Disch-Falk Field	0–2	.000	–
1978	Disch-Falk Field	0–2	.000	Did not score a run
1979	Disch-Falk Field	2–2	.500	Finished second
1980	Olsen Field	3–2	.400	Played Texas thrice
1981	Disch-Falk Field	2–2	.500	–
1982	Olsen Field	1–2	.333	–
1983	Disch-Falk Field	3–2	.600	Played Houston twice, Texas three times
1984	Disch-Falk Field	0–2	.000	Lost both games 1–8
1985	George Cole Field	3–0	1.000	Champions
1986	Olsen Field	0–1	.000	L, Texas A&M, 0–4
1987	Disch-Falk Field	2–2	.500	Finished second
1988	George Cole Field	0–2	.000	–
1989	Olson Field	1–2	.333	Finished second
1990	Disch-Falk Field	1–2	.333	–
SWC Total	-	18–25	.419	14 straight appearances
1992	Superdome	1–2	.333	First SEC tournament
1993	Alex Box Stadium	1–2	.333	–
1994	Swayze Field	0–2	.000	Lost to Auburn in 17 innings, finished third
1995	Dudy Noble Field	2–2	.500	–
1996	Hoover Metropolitan Stadium	0–1	.000	L, Kentucky, 5–7
1997	Golden Park	0–1	.000	L, Auburn, 3–7
1998	Hoover Met.	3–1	.750	Defeated Miss. St. twice
1999	Hoover Met.	4–2	.667	Played Auburn three times
2002	Hoover Met.	1–2	.333	–
2003	Hoover Met.	0–2	.000	–
2004	Hoover Met.	2–2	.500	–
2005	Hoover Met.	0–2	.000	–
2006	Hoover Met.	0–2	.000	–
2007	Regions Park	3–1	.000	Finished second
2009	Regions Park	2–2	.500	Finished third
2010	Regions Park	0–2	.000	
2011	Regions Park	2–2	.500	
2012	Regions Park	0–2	.000	
2013	Hoover Met.	2–1	.667	
2014	Hoover Met.	3–2	.600	
2015	Hoover Met.	2–2	.500	
2017	Hoover Met.	3–2	.600	Finished second
2018	Hoover Met.	2–1	.667	
2019	Hoover Met.	1–2	.333	
2021	Hoover Met.	4–0	1.000	SEC Tournament champions
2022	Hoover Met.	0–2	.000	
2023	Hoover Met.	2–1	.667	
2024	Hoover Met.	0–2	.000	
2025	Hoover Met.	0–1	.000	
SEC Total	-	40–48	.460	28 appearances
Total	-	58–73	.446	43 appearances

=== NCAA tournament ===
Year	Site	Record	Notes
1973	Arlington Stadium	0–2	NCAA Division VI
1979	Seminole Stadium	4–0	Won East Regional
1979	Rosenblatt Stadium	3–2	CWS runner-up
1980	J. L. Johnson Stadium	1–2	Midwest Regional
1983	Allie P. Reynolds Stadium	0–2	Midwest Regional
1985	Seminole Stadium	4–0	Won South II Regional
1985	Rosenblatt Stadium	2–2	CWS Third place
1986	Allie P. Reynolds Stadium	1–2	Midwest Regional
1987	Joe W. Davis Stadium	4–0	South I Regional
1987	Rosenblatt Stadium	1–2	CWS Fifth place
1988	Allie P. Reynolds Stadium	0–2	Midwest Regional
1989	Municipal Stadium	4–1	Won Northwest Regional
1989	Rosenblatt Stadium	1–2	CWS Fifth place
1990	Eck Stadium	0–2	Midwest Regional
1995	Eck Stadium	0–2	Midwest I Regional
1996	Dan Law Field	0–2	Central II Regional
1998	Eck Stadium	1–2	Midwest Regional
1999	Baum Stadium	1–2	Fayetteville Regional
2002	Eck Stadium	3–0	Won Wichita Regional
2002	Kingsmore Stadium	1–2	Super Regional
2003	Disch-Falk Field	1–2	Austin Regional
2004	Baum Stadium	4–1	Won Fayetteville Regional
2004	Baum Stadium	2–0	Won Fayetteville Super Regional
2004	Rosenblatt Stadium	0–2	CWS Seventh place
2005	Disch-Falk Field	2–2	Austin Regional
2006	Baum Stadium	1–2	Fayetteville Regional
2007	Baum Stadium	2–2	Fayetteville Regional
2008	Sunken Diamond	0–2	Palo Alto Regional
2009	L. Dale Mitchell Baseball Park	3–0	Won Norman Regional
2009	Dick Howser Stadium	2–0	Won Tallahassee Super Regional
2009	Rosenblatt Stadium	2–2	CWS Third Place
2010	Baum Stadium	3–1	Won Fayetteville Regional
2010	Packard Stadium	0–2	Tempe Super Regional
2011	Packard Stadium	2–2	Tempe Regional
2012	Reckling Park	3–0	Won Houston Regional
2012	Baylor Ballpark	2–1	Won Waco Super Regional
2012	TD Ameritrade Park	2–2	CWS Third Place
2013	Tointon Family Stadium	2–2	Manhattan Regional
2014	Davenport Field	2–2	Charlottesville Regional
2015	Allie P. Reynolds Stadium	3–0	Won Stillwater Regional
2015	Baum Stadium	2–1	Won Fayetteville Super Regional
2015	TD Ameritrade Park	0–2	CWS Seventh place
2017	Baum Stadium	3–2	Lost Fayetteville Regional
2018	Baum Stadium	3–0	Won Fayetteville Regional
2018	Baum Stadium	2–1	Won Fayetteville Super Regional
2018	TD Ameritrade Park	4–2	CWS Runner-up
2019	Baum Stadium	3–0	Won Fayetteville Regional
2019	Baum Stadium	2–1	Won Fayetteville Super Regional
2019	TD Ameritrade Park	0–2	CWS Seventh place
2021	Baum-Walker Stadium	3–1	Won Fayetteville Regional
2021	Baum-Walker Stadium	1–2	Lost Fayetteville Super Regional
2022	O'Brate Stadium	3–1	Won Stillwater Regional
2022	Boshamer Stadium	2–0	Won Chapel Hill Super Regional
2022	Charles Schwab Field	3–2	CWS Third place
2023	Baum-Walker Stadium	2–2	Lost Fayetteville Regional
2024	Baum-Walker Stadium	1–2	Lost Fayetteville Regional
2025	Baum-Walker Stadium	3–0	Won Fayetteville Regional
2025	Baum-Walker Stadium	2–0	Won Fayetteville Super Regional
2025	Charles Schwab Field	2–2	CWS Third place
2026	Hoglund Ballpark	2–2	Lost Lawrence Regional
Total	-	110–80	(74–49 regionals) (18–9 super reg.) (18–23 CWS)

Source: Razorbacks baseball History in NCAA and Conference Postseason Tournaments

== Conference affiliations ==
- Southwest Conference: 1922–1926, 1974–1991
- Southeastern Conference: 1992–present

== Alumni ==
=== Golden Spikes Award & Dick Howser Trophy ===
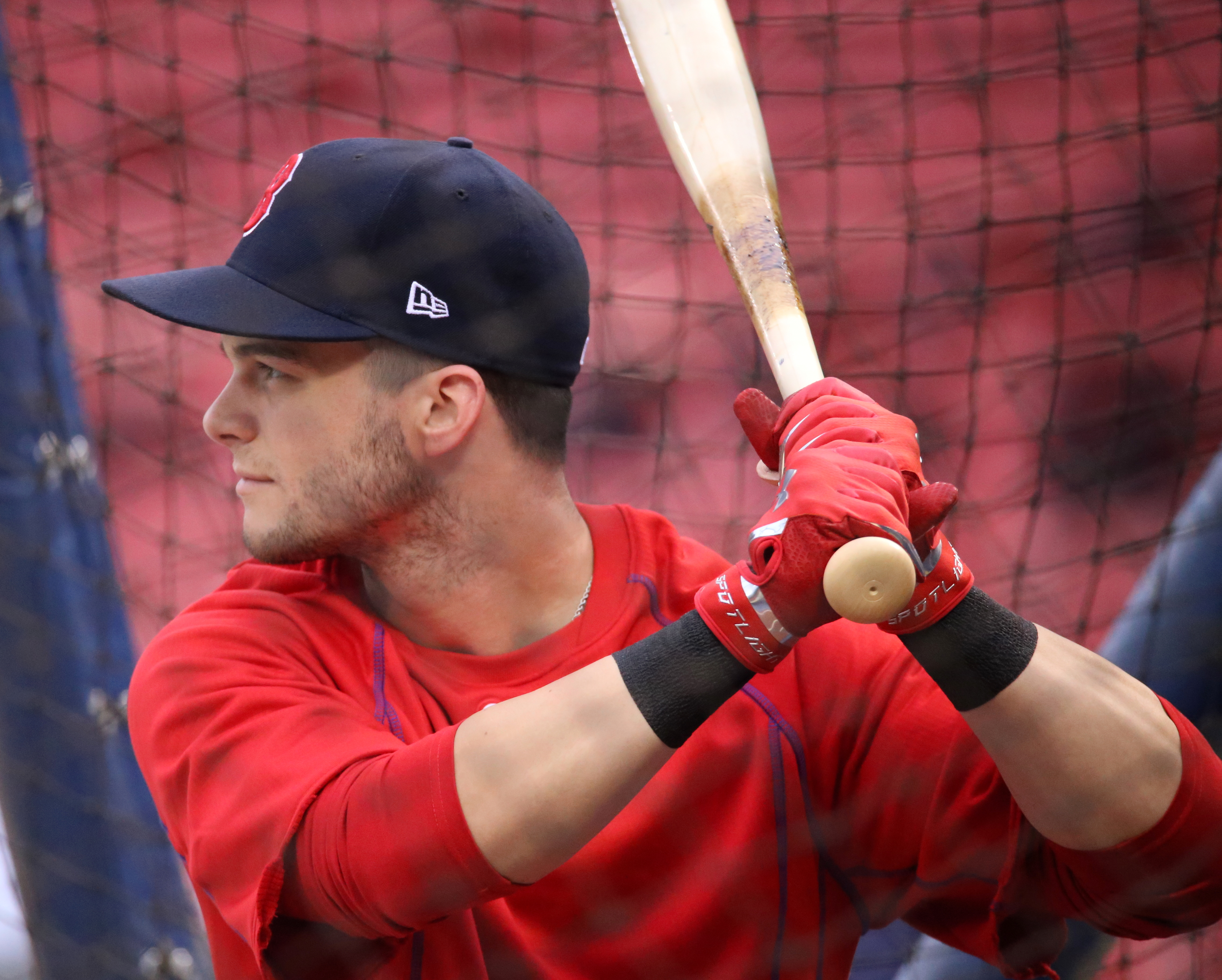
Andrew Benintendi

Arkansas has produced three winners of the Golden Spikes Award and Dick Howser Trophy, bestowed annually to the best amateur baseball player in the United States. It was created by USA Baseball and is sponsored by the Major League Baseball Players Association.

- Andrew Benintendi – 2015
- Kevin Kopps – 2021
- Wehiwa Aloy – 2025

=== All-Americans ===
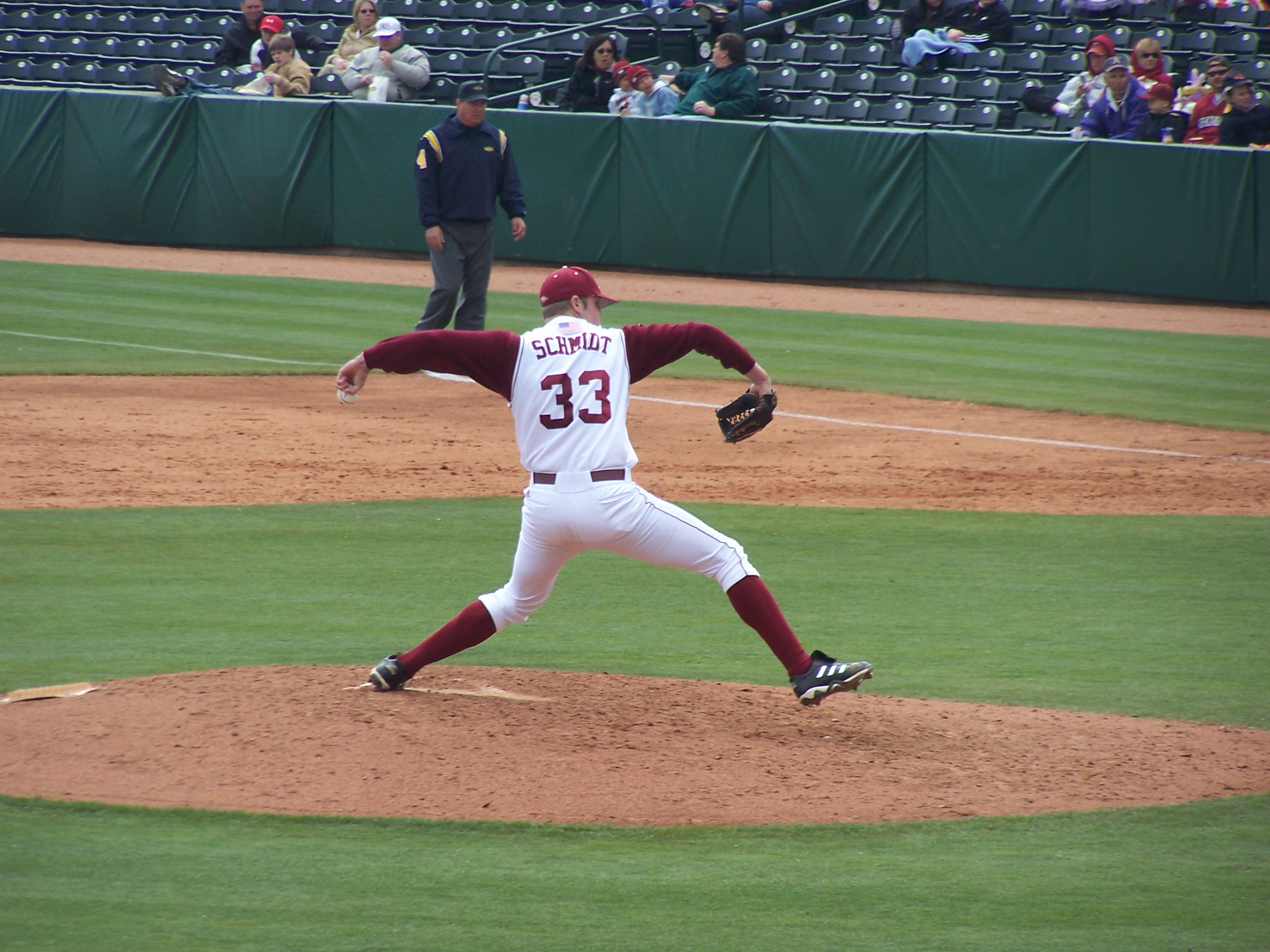
Nick Schmidt pitching in 2007.

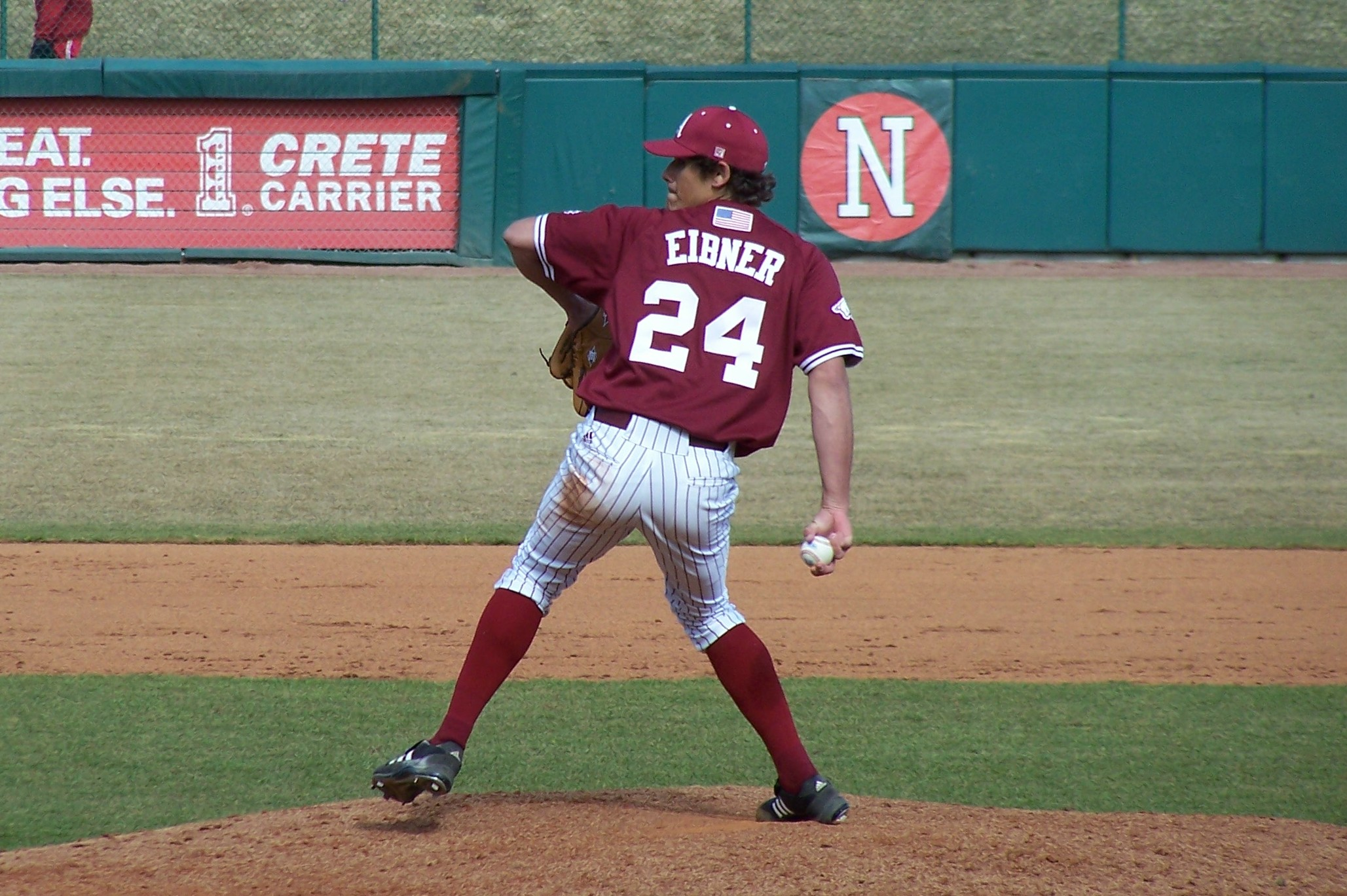
Brett Eibner

The Razorbacks have produced 31 All-Americans. Jeff King, Kevin McReynolds, Nick Schmidt, Phillip Stidham, and David Walling have earned the honors twice.

- Greg D'Alexander – 1990
- Andrew Benintendi – 2015
- Isaiah Campbell - 2019
- Zack Cox – 2010
- Matt Cronin - 2019
- Brett Eibner – 2010
- Troy Eklund – 1989
- Christian Franklin - 2021
- Charlie Isaacson – 1999
- Jack Kenley - 2019
- Jeff King – 1985, 1986
- Heston Kjerstad - 2020
- Blaine Knight – 2018
- Kevin Kopps - 2021
- Ralph Kraus – 1986
- Steve Krueger – 1980
- Mike Loggins – 1985
- Tim Lollar – 1978
- Ryan Lundquist – 1997
- Kevin McReynolds – 1980, 1981
- Kenderick Moore – 1996
- Matt Reynolds – 2012
- Ronn Reynolds – 1979
- Nick Schmidt – 2006, 2007
- Carson Shaddy - 2018
- Andy Skeels – 1987
- Ryne Stanek – 2013
- Phillip Stidham – 1990, 1991
- Jess Todd – 2007
- David Walling – 1998, 1999
- Patrick Wicklander - 2021

Source: Arkansas Razorbacks baseball All-Americans

=== Freshman All-Americans ===
The Razorbacks have also produced 25 Freshmen All-Americans.

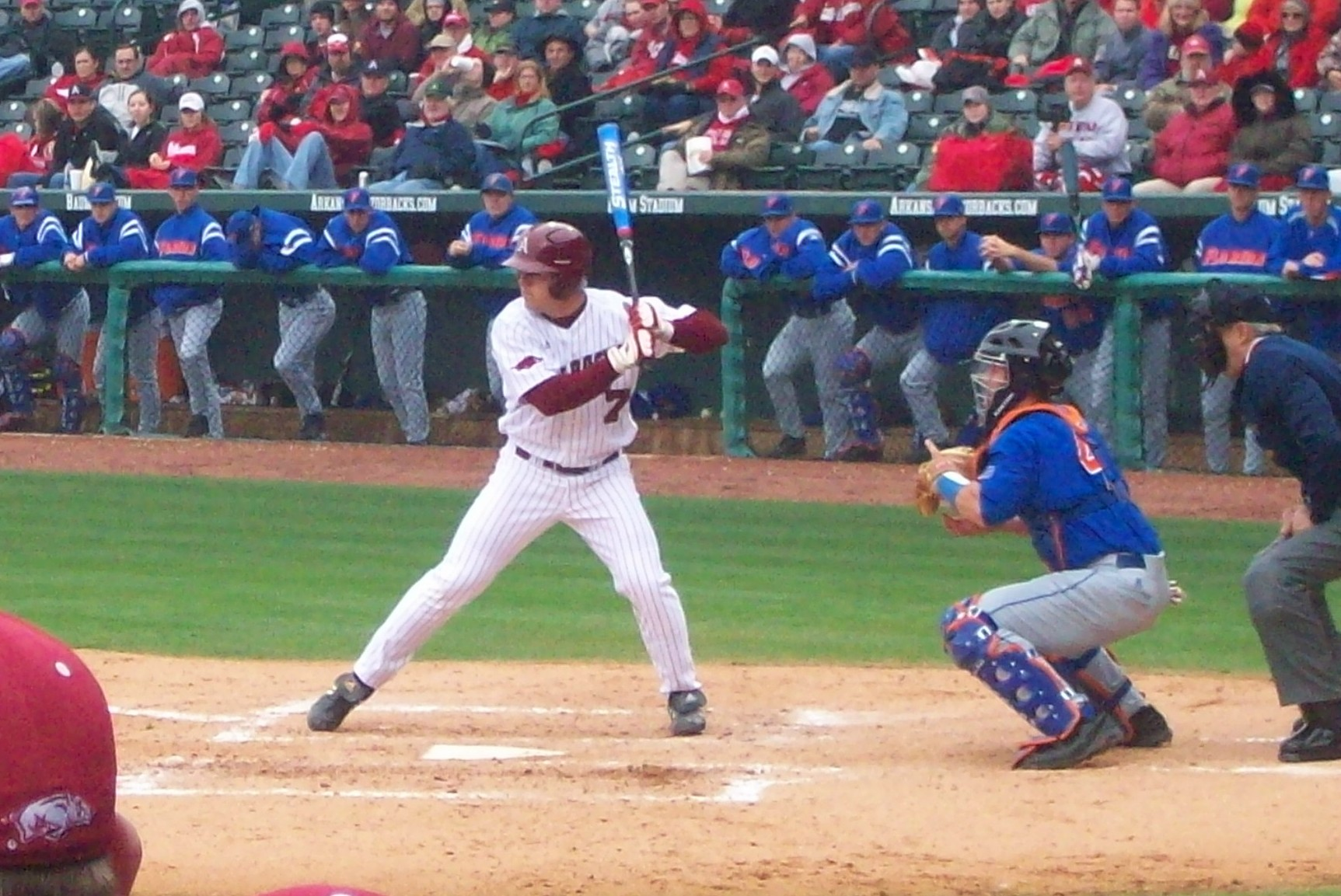
Zach Cox, a 2009 Freshman All-American at the bat.

- Barrett Astin – 2011
- Matt Carnes – 1995
- Zack Cox – 2009
- Jake Dugger – 2004
- Brett Eibner – 2008
- Matt Erickson – 1995
- James Ewing – 2006
- Dominic Ficociello – 2011
- Dominic Fletcher – 2017
- Gabe Gaeckle - 2024
- Danny Hamblin – 2004
- Charlie Isaacson – 1999
- Jeff King – 1984
- Brian Kirby – 1998
- Heston Kjerstad – 2018
- Casey Martin – 2018
- Keaton McKinney – 2015
- Robert Moore - 2020, 2021
- Connor Noland - 2019
- Nolan Sanburn – 2011
- Nick Schmidt – 2005
- Shaun Seibert – 2005
- Tyler Spoon – 2013
- Phillip Stidham – 1989
- Cayden Wallace - 2021

Source: Arkansas Razorbacks baseball Freshmen All-Americans

=== Major Leaguers ===
54 former Razorbacks have played at least one game in the Majors.

Name	Years in MLB	Years at UA	Team(s)
Darrel Akerfelds	1986–1991	1981–1982	Oakland Athletics, Cleveland Indians, Texas Rangers, Philadelphia Phillies
Brian Anderson	2017–2023	2012–2014	Miami Marlins
Barrett Astin	2017	2011–2013	Cincinnati Reds
Jalen Beeks	2018–2020, 2022–present	2012–2014	Boston Red Sox, Tampa Bay Rays
Sid Benton	1922	1912	St. Louis Cardinals (a cup of coffee)
Andrew Benintendi	2016–present	2014–2015	Boston Red Sox, Kansas City Royals
Mike Bolsinger	2014–2017	2008–2010	Arizona Diamondbacks, Los Angeles Dodgers, Toronto Blue Jays
Bud Bloomfield	1963–1964	1955–1956	Minnesota Twins, St. Louis Cardinals
Kevin Campbell	1991–1995	1984–1986	Oakland Athletics, Minnesota Twins
Bubba Carpenter	2000	1988–1991	Colorado Rockies, New York Mets
Cody Clark	2013	2001–2002	Houston Astros
Chuck Corgan	1925–1927	1922–1925	Brooklyn Robins
Brett Eibner	2016–2017, 2020	2008–2010	Kansas City Royals, Oakland Athletics, Los Angeles Dodgers
Babe Ellison	1916–1920	1914–1916	Detroit Tigers
Matt Erickson	2004	1995–1997	Milwaukee Brewers
Logan Forsythe	2011–2020	2006–2008	San Diego Padres, Tampa Bay Rays, Los Angeles Dodgers
Craig Gentry	2009–2018	2005–2006	Texas Rangers, Oakland Athletics, Los Angeles Angels of Anaheim, Baltimore Orioles
Gerry Hannahs	1976–1979	1971–1974	Montreal Expos, Los Angeles Dodgers
Howard Hilton	1990	1984–1985	St. Louis Cardinals (played only two games)
Eric Hinske	2002–2013	1996–1998	Toronto Blue Jays, Boston Red Sox, Tampa Bay Rays, Pittsburgh Pirates, New York Yankees (MLB Rookie of the Year)
Dick Hughes	1966–1968	1957–1958	St. Louis Cardinals
Lefty Jamerson	1924	1919–1921	Boston Red Sox (cup of coffee)
Skeeter Kell	1952	1948–1951	Philadelphia Athletics
Dallas Keuchel	2012–2023	2007–2009	Houston Astros, 2017 World Series champion, 2015 AL Cy Young Award, Gold Glove winner
Jeff King	1989–1999	1984–1986	Pittsburgh Pirates, Kansas City Royals
Heston Kjerstad	2023–present	2018–2020	Baltimore Orioles
Jimmy Kremers	1990	1985–1988	Atlanta Braves
Les Lancaster	1987–1993	1982–1984	Chicago Cubs, Detroit Tigers, St. Louis Cardinals
Cliff Lee	2002–2014	2000	Cleveland Indians, Texas Rangers, Philadelphia Phillies, 4-time All-Star, MLB wins leader and Cy Young Award 2008
Tim Lollar	1980–1986	1977–1978	New York Yankees, San Diego Padres, Chicago White Sox, Boston Red Sox
James McCann	2014–present	2009–2011	Detroit Tigers, Chicago White Sox, New York Mets
Kevin McReynolds	1983–1994	1979–1981	San Diego Padres, New York Mets, Kansas City Royals
Mike Oquist	1993–1999	1987–1989	Baltimore Orioles, San Diego Padres, Oakland Athletics
Tom Pagnozzi	1987–1998	1983	St. Louis Cardinals (All-Star and 3 time Gold Glove winner)
Blake Parker	2012–2021	2004–2006	Chicago Cubs, Seattle Mariners, New York Yankees, Los Angeles Angels
Kit Pellow	2002–2004	1995–1996	Kansas City Royals, Colorado Rockies
Scott Pose	1993–2000	1988–1989	Florida Marlins, New York Yankees, Kansas City Royals
Johnny Ray	1981–1990	1978–1979	Pittsburgh Pirates, California Angels
Matt Reynolds	2016–2023	2010–2012	New York Mets, Washington Nationals
Ronn Reynolds	1982–1990	1979–1980	New York Mets, Philadelphia Phillies, Houston Astros, San Diego Padres
Pat Rice	1991	1979–1980	Seattle Mariners
Jeff Richardson	1989–1993	1984	Cincinnati Reds, Pittsburgh Pirates, Boston Red Sox
Reyn Rogers	2008	2006–2008	Seattle Mariners
Tim Sherrill	1990–1991	1986–1987	St. Louis Cardinals
Drew Smyly	2012–2016, 2019–present	2008–2010	Detroit Tigers, Tampa Bay Rays, Seattle Mariners
Ryne Stanek	2017–present	2011–2013	Tampa Bay Rays
Phil Stidham	1994	1989–1991	Detroit Tigers
Jess Todd	2009–2010	2006–2007	St. Louis Cardinals, Cleveland Indians
Chuck Tompkins	1912	1909–1911	Cincinnati Reds (cup of coffee)
Matt Wagner	1996	1991–1992	Seattle Mariners
Jim Walkup	1934–1939	1928–1929	St. Louis Browns, Detroit Tigers
Duke Welker	2013	2007	Pittsburgh Pirates
Andy Wilkins	2014–2016	2008–2010	Chicago White Sox, Milwaukee Brewers
Jack Whillock	1971	1962–1964	Detroit Tigers
Roy Wood	1913–1915	1912–1913	Pittsburgh Pirates, Cleveland Indians
Dan Wright	2001–2004	1997–1999	Chicago White Sox

Source: Razorbacks baseball-Razorbacks in the Majors

== See also ==
- List of NCAA Division I baseball programs
