= List of San Diego Padres first-round draft picks =

The San Diego Padres are an American professional baseball team based in San Diego. The Padres compete in Major League Baseball (MLB) as a member club of the National League (NL) West Division. Since the institution of MLB's Rule 4 Draft, the Padres have selected 73 players in the first round. Officially known as the "First-Year Player Draft", the Rule 4 Draft is MLB's primary mechanism for assigning players from high schools, colleges, and other amateur clubs to its franchises. The draft order is determined based on the previous season's standings, with the team possessing the worst record receiving the first pick. In addition, teams which lost free agents in the previous off-season may be awarded compensatory or supplementary picks. The First-Year Player Draft is unrelated to the 1968 expansion draft in which the Padres initially filled their roster.

Of the 73 players picked in the first round by San Diego, 32 have been pitchers, the most of any position; 20 of these were right-handed, while 12 were left-handed. Fourteen outfielders were selected, while ten shortstops, seven catchers, five third basemen, and four first basemen were taken as well. The team has also drafted one player at second base. Eleven of the players came from high schools or universities in the state of California, and Florida and Georgia follow with ten and six players, respectively.

None of the Padres' first-round picks have won a World Series championship with the team. None of these picks have won the MLB Rookie of the Year award, although Khalil Greene (2002) placed second in the voting in 2004. Dave Winfield (1973) is the only first-round pick of the Padres in the Baseball Hall of Fame, inducted in 2001 as an outfielder. Drafted as a pitcher, Winfield was named to 12 All-Star teams, won 7 Gold Gloves and 6 Silver Sluggers, and finished as high as third in MVP award voting (in 1979) over the course of his 22-season career.

The Padres have made 21 selections in the supplemental round of the draft. They have also made the first overall selection five times (1970, 1972, 1974, 1988, and 2004), tied for the most such picks with the New York Mets. They have also had 24 compensatory picks since the institution of the First-Year Player Draft in 1965. These additional picks are provided when a team loses a particularly valuable free agent in the previous off-season,^{[V]} or, more recently, if a team fails to sign a draft pick from the previous year. The Padres have failed to sign two of their first-round picks, Karsten Whitson (2010) and Brett Austin (2011), and received the 10th pick in 2011 and 55th pick in 2012 as compensation.

== Key ==
| Year | Each year links to an article about that year's Major League Baseball draft. |
| Position | Indicates the secondary/collegiate position at which the player was drafted, rather than the professional position the player may have gone on to play |
| Pick | Indicates the number of the pick |
| * | Player did not sign with the Padres |
| § | Indicates a supplemental pick |
| † | Member of the National Baseball Hall of Fame and Museum |

== Picks ==
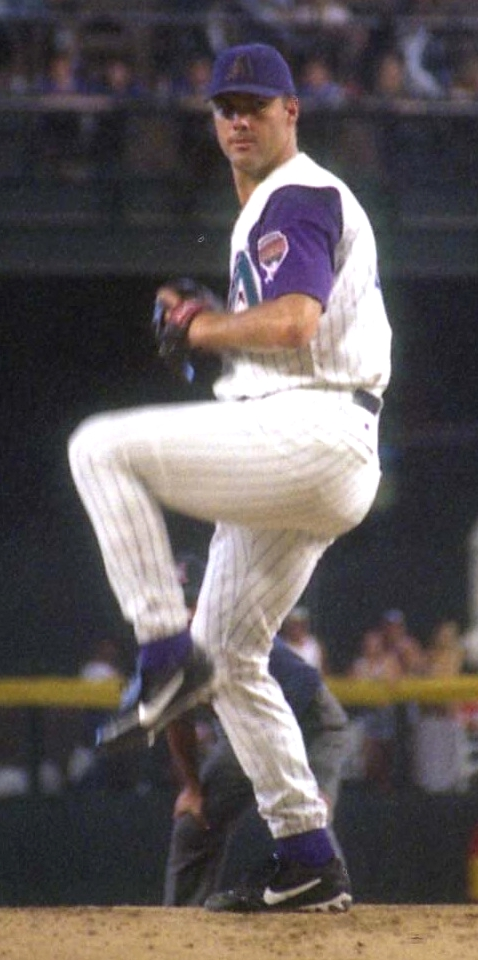
Andy Benes (1988) was one of the Padres' five first-overall selections in draft history.

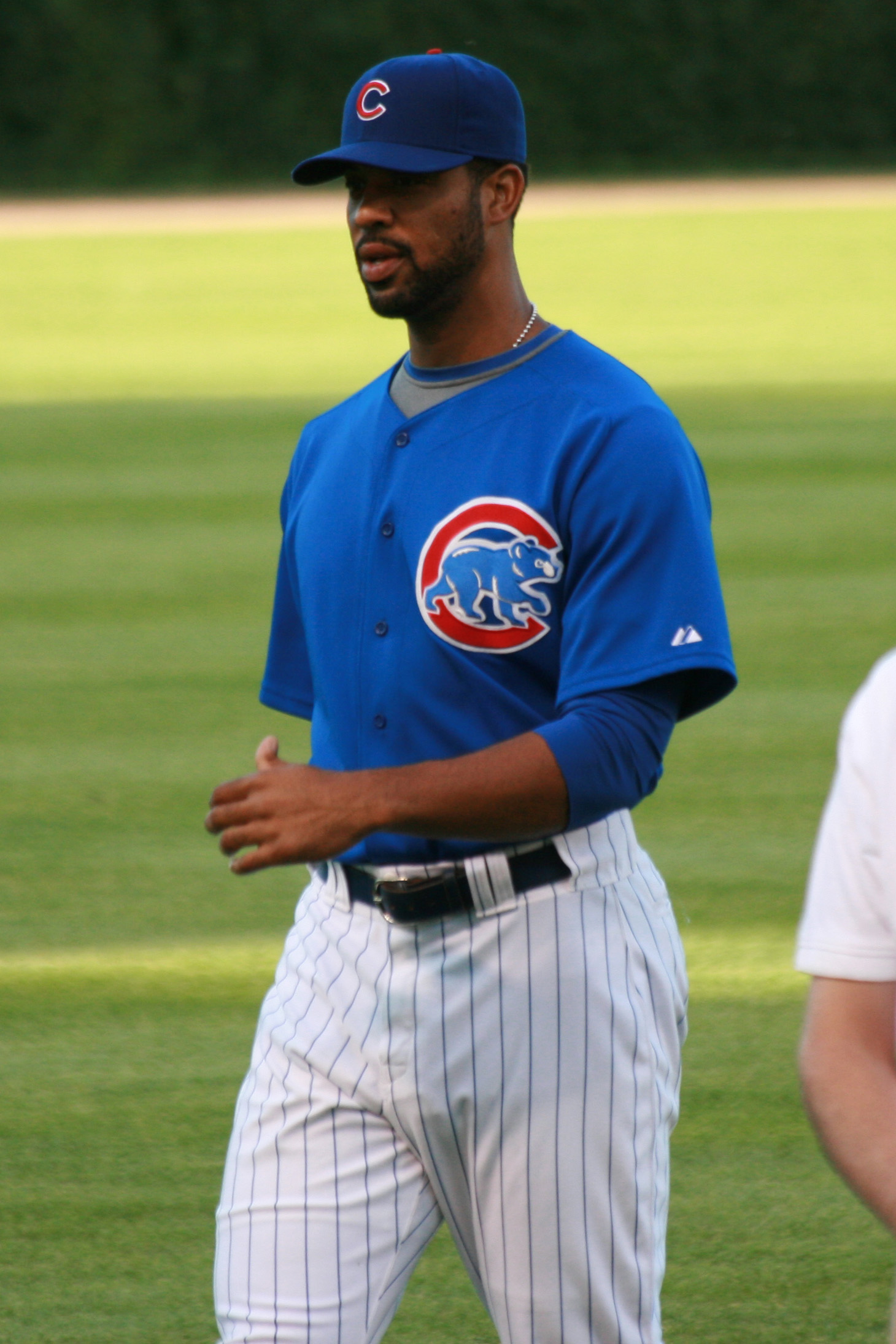
Derrek Lee (1993) is one of nine players drafted from the Padres' home state of California.

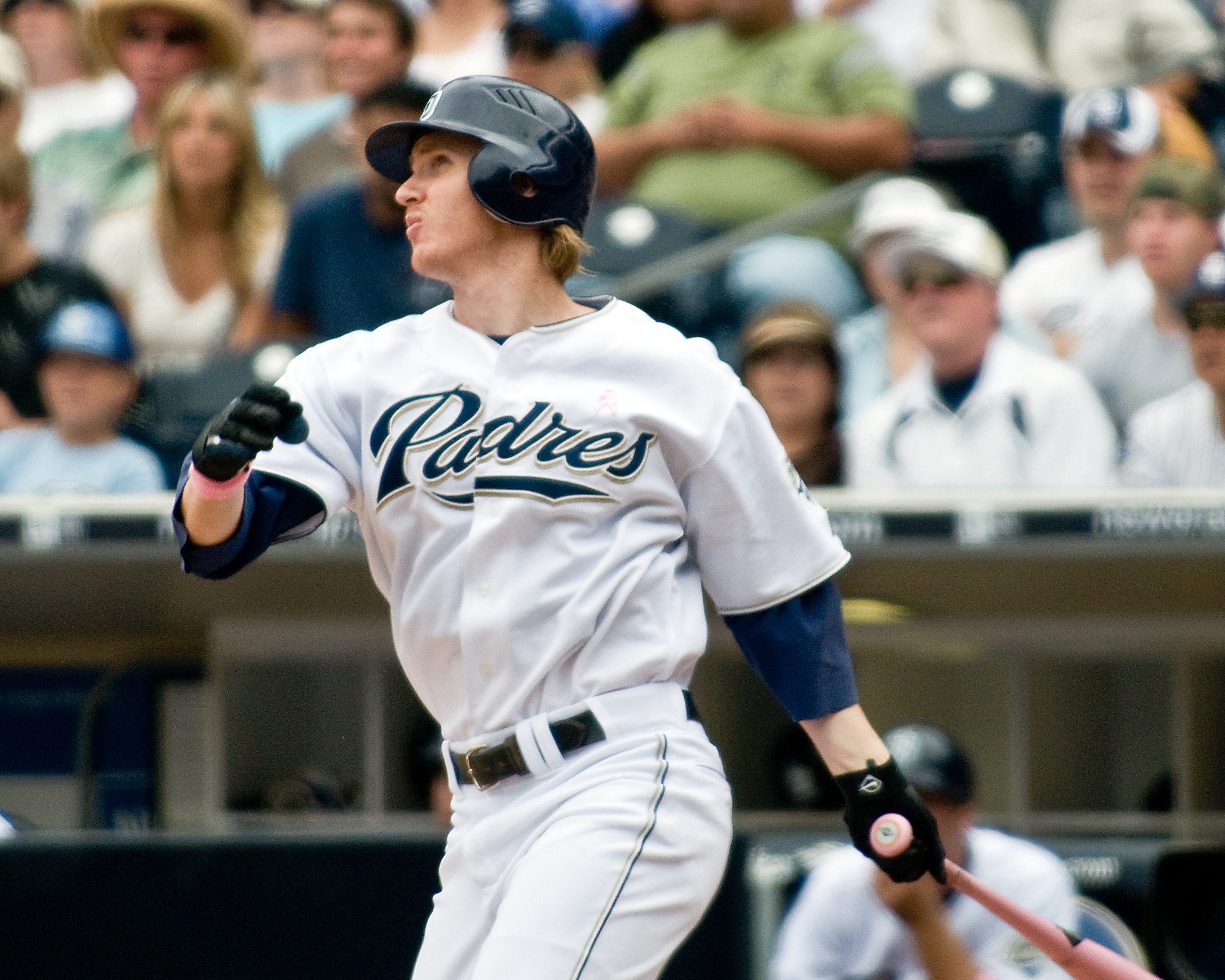
Khalil Greene (2002) finished second in Rookie of the Year voting in 2004.

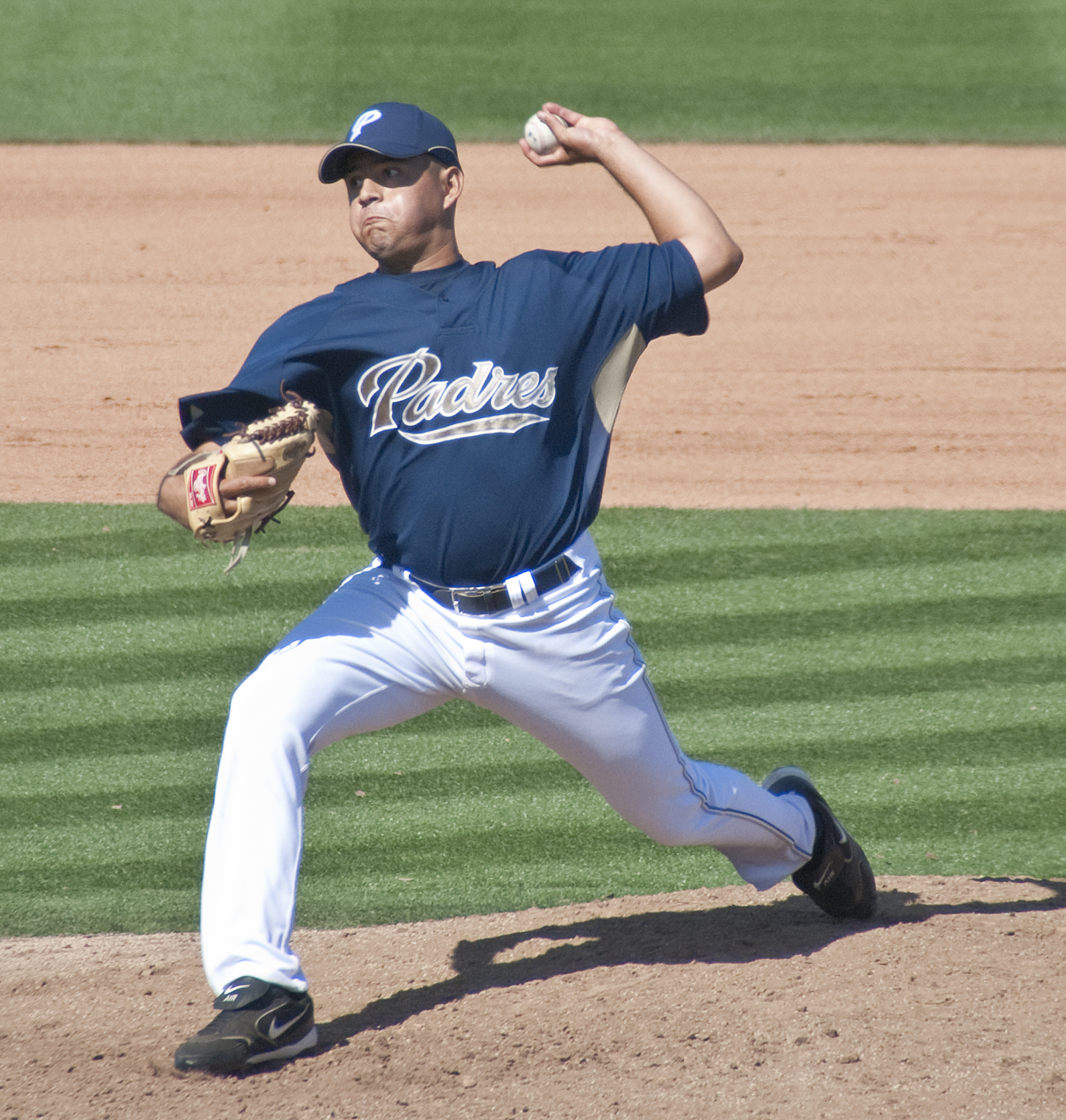
Cesar Ramos (2005) was drafted with a supplemental pick the Padres received for losing David Wells via free agency.

| Year | Name | Position | School (Location) | Pick | Ref |
|---|---|---|---|---|---|
| 1969 | Randy Elliott | First baseman | Adolfo Camarillo High School (Camarillo, California) | 24 | |
| 1970 | Mike Ivie | Catcher | Walker High School (Decatur, Georgia) | 1 | |
| 1971 | Jay Franklin | Right-handed pitcher | James Madison High School (Vienna, Virginia) | 2 | |
| 1972 | Dave Roberts | Third baseman | University of Oregon (Eugene, Oregon) | 1 | |
| 1973 | Dave Winfield† | Right Fielder | University of Minnesota (Minneapolis, Minnesota) | 4 | |
| 1974 | Bill Almon | Shortstop | Brown University (Providence, Rhode Island) | 1 | |
| 1975 | Mike Lentz | Left-handed pitcher | Juanita High School (Kirkland, Washington) | 2 | |
| 1976 | Bob Owchinko | Left-handed pitcher | Eastern Michigan University (Ypsilanti, Michigan) | 5 | |
| 1977 | Brian Greer | Outfielder | Sonora High School (La Habra, California) | 8 | |
| 1978 | Andy Hawkins | Right-handed pitcher | Midway High School (Waco, Texas) | 5 | |
| 1979 | Joe Lansford | First baseman | Adrian C. Wilcox High School (Santa Clara, California) | 14 | |
| 1979 | Bob Geren | Catcher | Clairemont High School (San Diego, California) | 24^{[a]} | |
| 1980 | Jeff Pyburn | Outfielder | University of Georgia (Athens, Georgia) | 5 | |
| 1981 | Kevin McReynolds | Outfielder | University of Arkansas (Fayetteville, Arkansas) | 6 | |
| 1981 | Frank Castro | Catcher | University of Miami (Coral Gables, Florida) | 26^{[b]} | |
| 1982 | Jimmy Jones | Right-handed pitcher | Thomas Jefferson High School (Dallas, Texas) | 3 | |
| 1983 | Ray Hayward | Left-handed pitcher | University of Oklahoma (Norman, Oklahoma) | 10 | |
| 1984 | Shane Mack | Outfielder | UCLA (Los Angeles, California) | 11 | |
| 1984 | Gary Green | Shortstop | Oklahoma State University (Stillwater, Oklahoma) | 27^{§}^{[c]} | |
| 1985 | Joey Cora | Shortstop | Vanderbilt University (Nashville, Tennessee) | 23^{[d]} | |
| 1986 | Thomas Howard | Outfielder | Ball State University (Muncie, Indiana) | 11 | |
| 1987 | Kevin Garner | Right-handed pitcher | University of Texas (Austin, Texas) | 10 | |
| 1988 | Andy Benes | Right-handed pitcher | University of Evansville (Evansville, Indiana) | 1 | |
| 1989 | no first-round pick^{[e]} | | | | |
| 1990 | Robbie Beckett | Left-handed pitcher | McCallum High School (Austin, Texas) | 25^{[f]} | |
| 1990 | Scott Sanders | Right-handed pitcher | Nicholls State University (Thibodaux, Louisiana) | 32^{§}^{[g]} | |
| 1991 | Joey Hamilton | Right-handed pitcher | Georgia Southern University (Statesboro, Georgia) | 8 | |
| 1991 | Greg Anthony | Right-handed pitcher | Tavares High School (Tavares, Florida) | 31^{§}^{[h]} | |
| 1992 | no first-round pick^{[i]} | | | | |
| 1993 | Derrek Lee | First baseman | El Camino High School (Sacramento, California) | 14 | |
| 1994 | Dustin Hermanson | Right-handed pitcher | Kent State University (Kent, Ohio) | 3 | |
| 1995 | Ben Davis | Catcher | Malvern Prep School (Malvern, Pennsylvania) | 2 | |
| 1996 | Matt Halloran | Shortstop | Chancellor High School (Fredericksburg, Virginia) | 15 | |
| 1997 | Kevin Nicholson | Shortstop | Stetson University (DeLand, Florida) | 27 | |
| 1998 | Sean Burroughs | Third baseman | Wilson High School (Long Beach, California) | 9 | |
| 1999 | Vince Faison | Outfielder | Toombs County High School (Lyons, Georgia) | 20^{[j]} | |
| 1999 | Gerik Baxter | Right-handed pitcher | Edmonds Woodway High School (Edmonds, Washington) | 28 | |
| 1999 | Omar Ortiz | Right-handed pitcher | University of Texas–Pan American (Edinburg, Texas) | 29^{[k]} | |
| 1999 | Casey Burns | Right-handed pitcher | University of Richmond (Richmond, Virginia) | 41^{§}^{[l]} | |
| 1999 | Mike Bynum | Left-handed pitcher | University of North Carolina (Chapel Hill, North Carolina) | 49^{§}^{[m]} | |
| 1999 | Nick Trzesniak | Catcher | Victor J. Andrew High School (Tinley Park, Illinois) | 51^{§}^{[n]} | |
| 2000 | Mark Phillips | Left-handed pitcher | Hanover High School (Hanover, Pennsylvania) | 9 | |
| 2001 | Jake Gautreau | Third baseman | Tulane University (New Orleans, Louisiana) | 14 | |
| 2002 | Khalil Greene | Shortstop | Clemson University (Clemson, South Carolina) | 13 | |
| 2003 | Tim Stauffer | Right-handed pitcher | University of Richmond (Richmond, Virginia) | 4 | |
| 2004 | Matt Bush | Shortstop | Mission Bay High School (San Diego, California) | 1 | |
| 2005 | Cesar Carrillo | Right-handed pitcher | University of Miami (Coral Gables, Florida) | 18 | |
| 2005 | Cesar Ramos | Left-handed pitcher | California State University, Long Beach (Long Beach, California) | 35^{§}^{[o]} | |
| 2006 | Matt Antonelli | Third baseman | Wake Forest University (Winston-Salem, North Carolina) | 17 | |
| 2006 | Kyler Burke | Outfielder | Ooltewah High School (Ooltewah, Tennessee) | 35^{§}^{[p]} | |
| 2007 | Nick Schmidt | Left-handed pitcher | University of Arkansas (Fayetteville, Arkansas) | 23 | |
| 2007 | Kellen Kulbacki | Outfielder | James Madison University (Harrisonburg, Virginia) | 40^{§}^{[q]} | |
| 2007 | Drew Cumberland | Shortstop | Pace High School (Pace, Florida) | 46^{§}^{[r]} | |
| 2007 | Mitch Canham | Catcher | Oregon State University (Corvallis, Oregon) | 57^{§}^{[s]} | |
| 2007 | Cory Luebke | Left-handed pitcher | Ohio State University (Columbus, Ohio) | 63^{§}^{[t]} | |
| 2007 | Danny Payne | Outfielder | Georgia Tech (Atlanta, Georgia) | 64^{§}^{[u]} | |
| 2008 | Allan Dykstra | First baseman | Wake Forest University (Winston-Salem, North Carolina) | 23 | |
| 2008 | Jaff Decker | Outfielder | Sunrise Mountain High School (Peoria, Arizona) | 42^{§}^{[v]} | |
| 2008 | Logan Forsythe | Third baseman | University of Arkansas (Fayetteville, Arkansas) | 46^{§}^{[w]} | |
| 2009 | Donavan Tate | Center fielder | Cartersville High School (Cartersville, Georgia) | 3 | |
| 2010 | Karsten Whitson* | Right-handed pitcher | Chipley High School (Chipley, Florida) | 9 | |
| 2011 | Cory Spangenberg | Second baseman | Indian River State College (Fort Pierce, Florida) | 10^{§}^{[x]} | |
| 2011 | Joe Ross | Right-handed pitcher | Bishop O'Dowd High School (Oakland, California) | 25 | |
| 2011 | Michael Kelly | Right-handed pitcher | West Boca Raton Community High School (Boca Raton, Florida) | 48^{§}^{[y]} | |
| 2011 | Brett Austin* | Catcher | Providence High School (Charlotte, North Carolina) | 54^{§}^{[z]} | |
| 2011 | Jace Peterson | Shortstop | McNeese State University (Lake Charles, Louisiana) | 58^{§}^{[aa]} | |
| 2012 | Max Fried | Left-handed pitcher | Harvard-Westlake School (Los Angeles, California) | 7 | |
| 2012 | Zach Eflin | Right-handed pitcher | Hagerty High School (Oviedo, Florida) | 33^{§}^{[ab]} | |
| 2012 | Travis Jankowski | Outfielder | Stony Brook University (Stony Brook, New York) | 44^{§}^{[ac]} | |
| 2012 | Walker Weickel | Right-handed pitcher | Olympia High School (Orlando, Florida) | 55^{§}^{[ad]} | |
| 2013 | Hunter Renfroe | Outfielder | Mississippi State University (Starkville, Mississippi) | 13 | |
| 2014 | Trea Turner | Shortstop | North Carolina State University (Raleigh, North Carolina) | 13 | |
| 2015 | no first-round pick | | | | |
| 2016 | Cal Quantrill | Right-handed pitcher | Stanford University (Palo Alto, California) | 8 | |
| 2016 | Hudson Sanchez | Shortstop | Carroll Senior High School (Southlake, Texas) | 24 | |
| 2016 | Eric Lauer | Left-handed pitcher | Kent State University (Kent, Ohio) | 25 | |
| 2017 | MacKenzie Gore | Left-handed pitcher | Whiteville, North Carolina (Columbus County, North Carolina) | 3 | |
| 2018 | Ryan Weathers | Left-handed pitcher | Loretto High School (Loretto, Tennessee) | 7 | |
| 2019 | C. J. Abrams | Shortstop | Blessed Trinity Catholic High School (Roswell, Georgia) | 6 | |
| 2020 | Robert Hassell | Outfielder | Independence High School (Thompson's Station, Tennessee) | 8 | |
| 2021 | Jackson Merrill | Shortstop | Severna Park High School (Severna Park, Maryland) | 27 | |
| 2022 | Dylan Lesko | Right-handed pitcher | Buford High School (Buford, Georgia) | 15 | |
| 2023 | Dillon Head | Outfielder | Homewood-Flossmoor High School (Flossmoor, Illinois) | 25 | |
| 2024 | Kash Mayfield | Pitcher | Elk City High School (Elk City, Oklahoma) | 25 | |
| 2025 | Kruz Schoolcraft | Pitcher | Sunset High School (Beaverton, Oregon) | 25 | |
| 2026 | Coleman Borthwick | Pitcher | South Walton High School (santa Rosa Beach, Florida) | 21 | |

== See also ==
- San Diego Padres minor league players

== Footnotes ==
- ^{V} Free agents are evaluated by the Elias Sports Bureau and rated "Type A", "Type B", or not compensation-eligible. If a team offers arbitration to a player but that player refuses and subsequently signs with another team, the original team may receive additional draft picks. If a "Type A" free agent leaves in this way his previous team receives a supplemental pick and a compensation pick from the team with which he signs. If a "Type B" free agent leaves in this way his previous team receives only a supplemental pick.
- ^{a} The Padres gained a compensatory first-round pick in 1979 from the Los Angeles Dodgers for losing free agent Derrel Thomas.
- ^{b} The Padres gained a compensatory first-round pick in 1981 from the New York Yankees for losing free agent Dave Winfield.
- ^{c} The Padres gained a supplemental first-round pick in 1984 for losing free agent Ruppert Jones.
- ^{d} The Padres gained a compensatory first-round pick in 1985 from the New York Yankees for losing free agent Ed Whitson.
- ^{e} The Padres lost their first-round pick in 1989 as compensation for signing free agent Bruce Hurst.
- ^{f} The Padres gained a compensatory first-round pick in 1990 from the Kansas City Royals for losing free agent Mark Davis.
- ^{g} The Padres gained a supplemental first-round pick in 1990 for losing free agent Mark Davis.
- ^{h} The Padres gained a supplemental first-round pick in 1991 for losing free agent Jack Clark.
- ^{i} The Padres lost their first-round pick in 1992 as compensation for signing free agent Kurt Stillwell.
- ^{j} The Padres gained a compensatory first-round pick in 1999 from the Los Angeles Dodgers as compensation for losing free agent Kevin Brown.
- ^{k} The Padres gained a compensatory first-round pick in 1999 from the Houston Astros as compensation for losing free agent Ken Caminiti.
- ^{l} The Padres gained a supplemental first-round pick in 1999 for losing free agent Kevin Brown.
- ^{m} The Padres gained a supplemental first-round pick in 1999 for losing free agent Ken Caminiti.
- ^{n} The Padres gained a supplemental first-round pick in 1999 for losing free agent Steve Finley.
- ^{o} The Padres gained a supplemental first-round pick in 2005 for losing free agent David Wells.
- ^{p} The Padres gained a supplemental first-round pick in 2006 for losing free agent Ramón Hernández.
- ^{q} The Padres gained a supplemental first-round pick in 2007 for losing free agent Woody Williams.
- ^{r} The Padres gained a supplemental first-round pick in 2007 for losing free agent Dave Roberts.
- ^{s} The Padres gained a supplemental first-round pick in 2007 for losing free agent Chan Ho Park.
- ^{t} The Padres gained a supplemental first-round pick in 2007 for losing free agent Alan Embree.
- ^{u} The Padres gained a supplemental first-round pick in 2007 for losing free agent Ryan Klesko.
- ^{v} The Padres gained a supplemental first-round pick in 2008 for losing free agent Doug Brocail.
- ^{w} The Padres gained a supplemental first-round pick in 2008 for losing free agent Mike Cameron.
- ^{x} The Padres gained a supplemental first-round pick in 2011 for failing to sign 2010 draft pick Karsten Whitson.
- ^{y} The Padres gained a supplemental first-round pick in 2011 for losing free agent Jon Garland.
- ^{z} The Padres gained a supplemental first-round pick in 2011 for losing free agent Yorvit Torrealba.
- ^{aa} The Padres gained a supplemental first-round pick in 2011 for losing free agent Kevin Correia.
- ^{ab} The Padres gained a supplemental first-round pick in 2012 for losing free agent Heath Bell.
- ^{ac} The Padres gained a supplemental first-round pick in 2012 for losing free agent Aaron Harang.
- ^{ad} The Padres gained a supplemental first-round pick in 2012 for failing to sign 2011 draft pick Brett Austin.
