= 2006 Southeastern Conference baseball tournament =

- Teams: 8
- Format: Two pools of four-team double elimination
- Finals site: Hoover Metropolitan Stadium; Hoover, Alabama
- Champions: Ole Miss (2nd title)
- Winning coach: Mike Bianco (1st title)
- MVP: Mark Wright (Ole Miss)
- Attendance: 108,173

2006 Southeastern Conference baseball standings
| | Conf. | | | | Overall |
| Team | W | | L | PCT | W | | L | PCT |
|---|---|---|---|---|---|---|---|---|
Eastern
| No. 18 Kentucky ^{x}‍†‍‍^{y} | 20 | – | 10 | .667 | 44 | – | 17 | .721 |
| No. 7 Georgia ‍‍‍^{y} | 18 | – | 12 | .600 | 47 | – | 23 | .671 |
| Vanderbilt ‍‍‍^{y} | 16 | – | 14 | .533 | 38 | – | 27 | .585 |
| No. 12 South Carolina ‍‍‍^{y} | 15 | – | 15 | .500 | 41 | – | 25 | .621 |
| Tennessee ‍‍‍ | 11 | – | 18 | .379 | 31 | – | 24 | .564 |
| Florida ‍‍‍ | 10 | – | 20 | .333 | 28 | – | 28 | .500 |
Western
| No. 9 Alabama ^{x}‍†‍‍^{y} | 20 | – | 10 | .667 | 44 | – | 21 | .677 |
| No. 25 Arkansas ‍‍‍^{y} | 18 | – | 12 | .600 | 39 | – | 21 | .650 |
| No. 11 Ole Miss ‍‍‡‍^{y} | 17 | – | 13 | .567 | 44 | – | 22 | .667 |
| LSU ‍‍‍ | 13 | – | 17 | .433 | 35 | – | 24 | .593 |
| Mississippi State ‍‍‍^{y} | 12 | – | 17 | .414 | 37 | – | 23 | .617 |
| Auburn ‍‍‍ | 9 | – | 21 | .300 | 22 | – | 34 | .393 |
x – Division champion † – Conference champion ‡ – Tournament champion y – Invited to the NCAA tournament As of June 30, 2006; Rankings from Collegiate Baseball

The 2006 Southeastern Conference baseball tournament was held at Hoover Metropolitan Stadium in Hoover, AL from May 24 through 28. Ole Miss won the tournament and earned the Southeastern Conference's automatic bid to the 2006 NCAA tournament.

== Regular season Results ==
Eastern Division
| Team | W | L | Pct | GB | Seed |
|---|---|---|---|---|---|
| Kentucky | 20 | 10 | .667 | -- | 2 |
| Georgia | 18 | 12 | .600 | 2 | 3 |
| Vanderbilt | 16 | 14 | .533 | 4 | 6 |
| South Carolina | 15 | 15 | .500 | 5 | 7 |
| Tennessee | 11 | 18 | .379 | 8.5 | -- |
| Florida | 10 | 20 | .333 | 12.5 | -- |

Western Division
| Team | W | L | Pct | GB | Seed |
|---|---|---|---|---|---|
| Alabama | 20 | 10 | .667 | -- | 1 |
| Arkansas | 18 | 12 | .600 | 2 | 4 |
| Ole Miss | 17 | 13 | .567 | 3 | 5 |
| LSU | 13 | 17 | .433 | 7 | 8 |
| Mississippi State | 12 | 17 | .414 | 7.5 | -- |
| Auburn | 9 | 21 | .300 | 11 | -- |

== Tournament ==
First round
5 | Ole Miss | 9
4 | Arkansas | 4
8 | LSU | 4
1 | Alabama | 3
4 | Arkansas | 3
1 | Alabama | 4
6 | Vanderbilt | 9
3 | Georgia | 4
7 | South Carolina | 4
2 | Kentucky | 2
3 | Georgia | 16
2 | Kentucky | 10

Second round
5 | Ole Miss | 12
8 | LSU | 1
1 | Alabama | 8
8 | LSU | 3
6 | Vanderbilt | 11
7 | South Carolina | 1
3 | Georgia | 16
7 | South Carolina | 10

Semifinals
5 | Ole Miss | 9 | -
1 | Alabama | 2 | -
6 | Vanderbilt | 4 | 11
3 | Georgia | 5 | 1

Finals
5 | Ole Miss | 9
6 | Vanderbilt | 3

- Mississippi State, Tennessee, Florida and Auburn did not make the tournament.

== All-Tournament Team ==
| Position | Player | School |
|---|---|---|
| 1B | C.J. Ketchum | Ole Miss |
| 2B | Justin Henry | Ole Miss |
| 3B | Pedro Alvarez | Vanderbilt |
| SS | Ryan Flaherty | Vanderbilt |
| C | Jason Jacobs | Georgia |
| OF | Dominic de la Osa | Vanderbilt |
| OF | Mark Wright | Ole Miss |
| OF | Alex Presley | Ole Miss |
| DH | Shea Robin | Vanderbilt |
| P | Wade LeBlanc | Alabama |
| P | Mike Cisco | South Carolina |
| MVP | Mark Wright | Ole Miss |

== See also ==
- College World Series
- NCAA Division I Baseball Championship
- Southeastern Conference baseball tournament
