= Zack Cox =

American baseball player (born 1989)

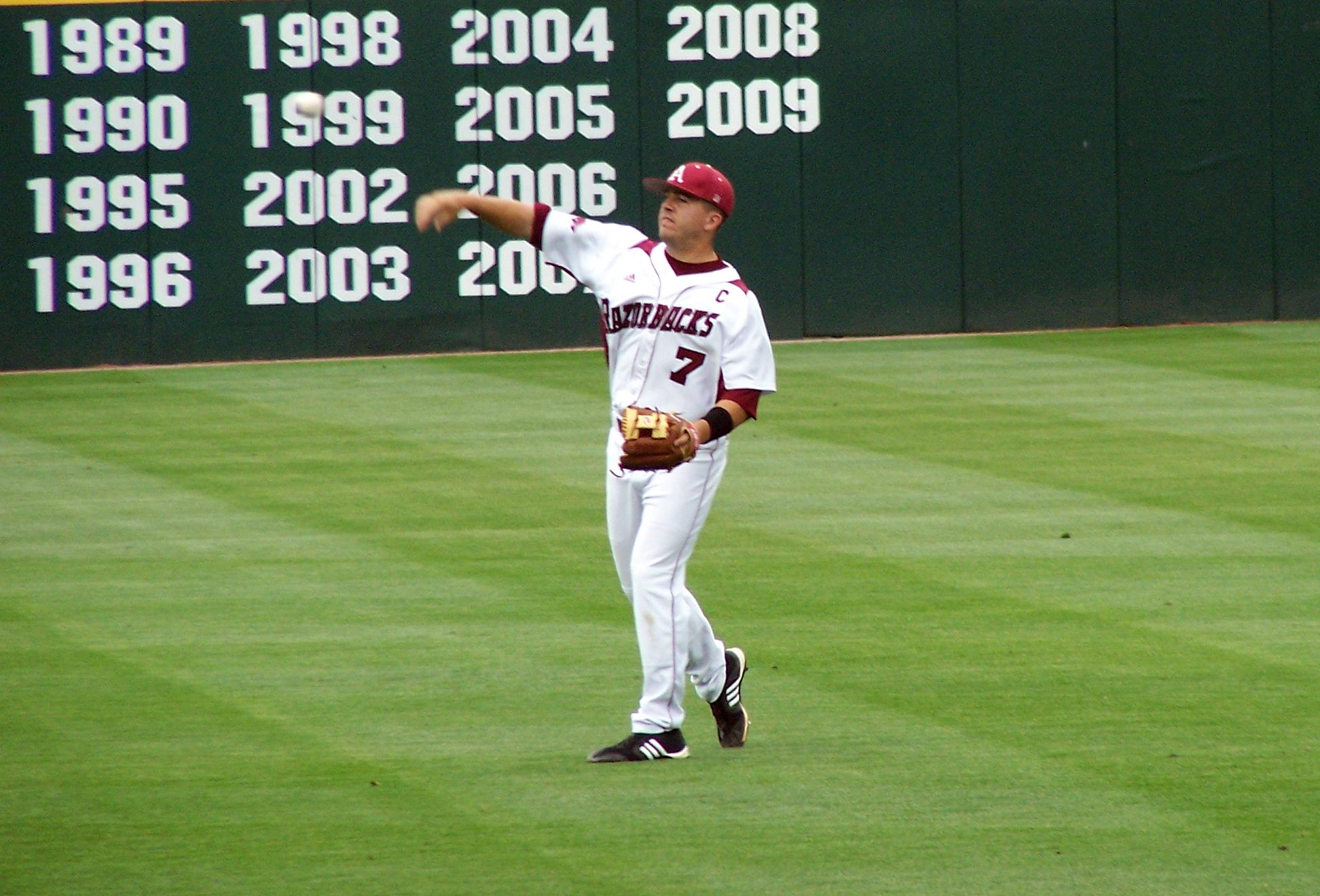
- Cox with the Arkansas Razorbacks
- Third baseman
- Born: May 9, 1989 (age 36); Campbellsville, Kentucky, U.S.
- Bats: Left Throws: Right
- Stats at Baseball Reference

Zackary Kendrick Cox (born May 9, 1989) is an American former professional baseball third baseman.

== Amateur career ==
Cox was born in Campbellsville, Kentucky. He attended Pleasure Ridge Park High School in the Pleasure Ridge Park neighborhood of Louisville, and played for the school's baseball team. Cox was selected in the 20th round of the 2008 Major League Baseball draft by the Los Angeles Dodgers. He did not sign, and instead attended the University of Arkansas, where he played college baseball for the Arkansas Razorbacks baseball team. In 2009, he played collegiate summer baseball with the Cotuit Kettleers of the Cape Cod Baseball League, and was named West division MVP of the league's annual all-star game. Cox was a 2010 All-American. He set Razorbacks records for hits (102) and batting average (.429).

== Professional career ==
=== St. Louis Cardinals ===
The St. Louis Cardinals selected Cox in the first round, with the 25th overall selection, of the 2010 Major League Baseball draft. He signed a major league contract with the Cardinals, receiving a four-year contract worth $3.2 million that included a $2 million signing bonus. Cox played only four games, receiving 17 plate appearances, for the Gulf Coast League's Cardinals that year. In 2011, Cox played for the Palm Beach Cardinals of the Class A-Advanced Florida State League and the Springfield Cardinals of the Class AA Texas League. Over the season, he had a .306 batting average, 13 home runs, and 68 runs batted in (RBIs).

Cox began the 2012 season with the Memphis Redbirds of the Class AAA Pacific Coast League. He batted .254 with nine home runs and 30 RBIs in 316 plate appearances.

=== Miami Marlins ===
On July 31, 2012, he was traded to the Miami Marlins for right-handed pitcher Edward Mujica. The Marlins assigned him to the Jacksonville Suns of the Class AA Southern League. Limited by injuries, he batted .253 with Jacksonville, hitting only one home run.

The Marlins waived Cox at the end of spring training in 2013, removing him from their 40 man roster. Unclaimed by other MLB teams, Cox returned to Jacksonville, where he batted .264 and hit three home runs with 29 RBIs.

=== Washington Nationals ===
Cox was selected by the Washington Nationals in the minor league phase of the Rule 5 Draft on December 10, 2015. He was released in April 2016.

=== Detroit Tigers ===
On December 15, 2016, Cox signed a minor-league contract with the Detroit Tigers. Cox spent the 2017 season with the Double–A Erie SeaWolves, playing in 85 games and hitting .281/.351/.361 with 3 home runs and 33 RBI. He elected free agency following the season on November 6, 2017.
