= Wehiwa Aloy =

American baseball player (born 2004)

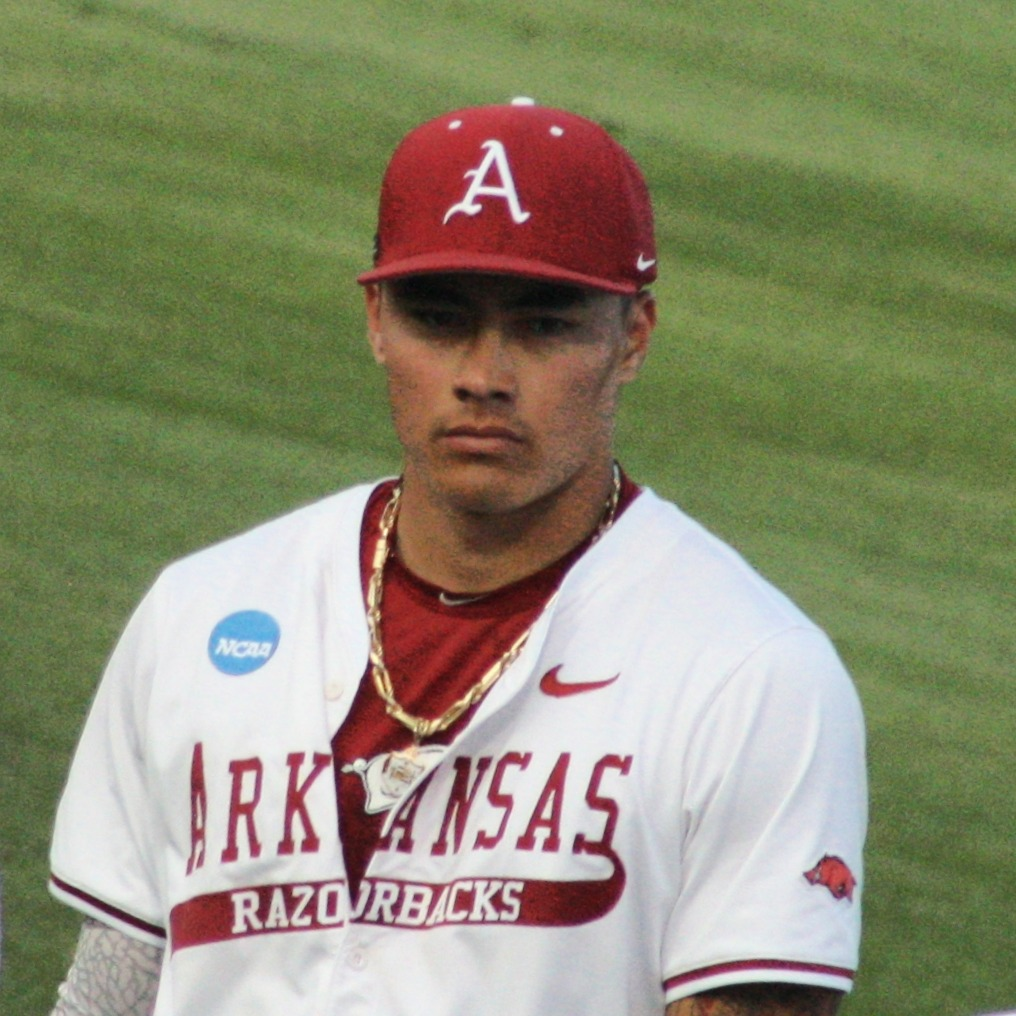
- Aloy with the Arkansas Razorbacks in 2025

Baltimore Orioles
- Shortstop / Third baseman
- Born: February 4, 2004 (age 22); Wailuku, Hawaii, U.S.
- Bats: Right Throws: Right
- Stats at Baseball Reference

Wehiwa Kapahulehua Aloy (/vɛˈhiːvə əˈlɔɪ/ veh-HEE-və ə-LOY; born February 4, 2004) is an American professional baseball shortstop in the Baltimore Orioles organization. He previously played college baseball for the Sacramento State Hornets and Arkansas Razorbacks.

== Amateur career ==
Aloy attended Henry Perrine Baldwin High School in Wailuku, Hawaii. After graduating in 2022, he enrolled at Sacramento State University to play college baseball. Over 56 games as a freshman in 2023, he hit .376 with 14 home runs and 46 RBI and was named the Western Athletic Conference Freshman of the Year. After the season, he transferred to the University of Arkansas.

Aloy started sixty games at shortstop for Arkansas during the 2024 season, batting .270 with 14 home runs and 56 RBI. That summer, he played in the Cape Cod Baseball League with the Yarmouth-Dennis Red Sox, with whom he earned Player of the Week honors in July.

Aloy returned as Arkansas' starting shortstop in 2025. Over 65 games, he hit .350 with 21 home runs and 68 RBI. He was named to the SEC First Team, was named the Southeastern Conference Baseball Player of the Year, and was awarded the 2025 Golden Spikes Award. Aloy is the third Razorback to win the Golden Spikes Award, along with Andrew Benintendi and Kevin Kopps. Aloy helped Arkansas to the 2025 College World Series where they finished third with an overall record of 50–15.

== Professional career ==
Aloy was selected by the Baltimore Orioles with the 31st overall pick in the 2025 Major League Baseball draft. He signed with Baltimore for a full-slot, $3.042 million signing bonus on July 19, 2025.

Aloy made his professional debut after signing with the Single-A Delmarva Shorebirds. He played in 20 games and hit .288 with two home runs and 14 RBI. Aloy was assigned to the High-A Frederick Keys to open the 2026 season. In July, he was promoted to the Double-A Chesapeake Baysox. Across 123 games between the two teams, Aloy batted .288 with 25 home runs, 92 RBI, and 20 stolen bases. He was named the Orioles' Minor League Player of the Year for 2026.

== Personal life ==
Aloy's father, Jamie, played college baseball at the University of Hawaiʻi and was selected in the 1999 Major League Baseball draft. His younger brother, Kuhio, plays baseball at Arkansas.
