= Andy Wilkins =

American baseball player (born 1988)

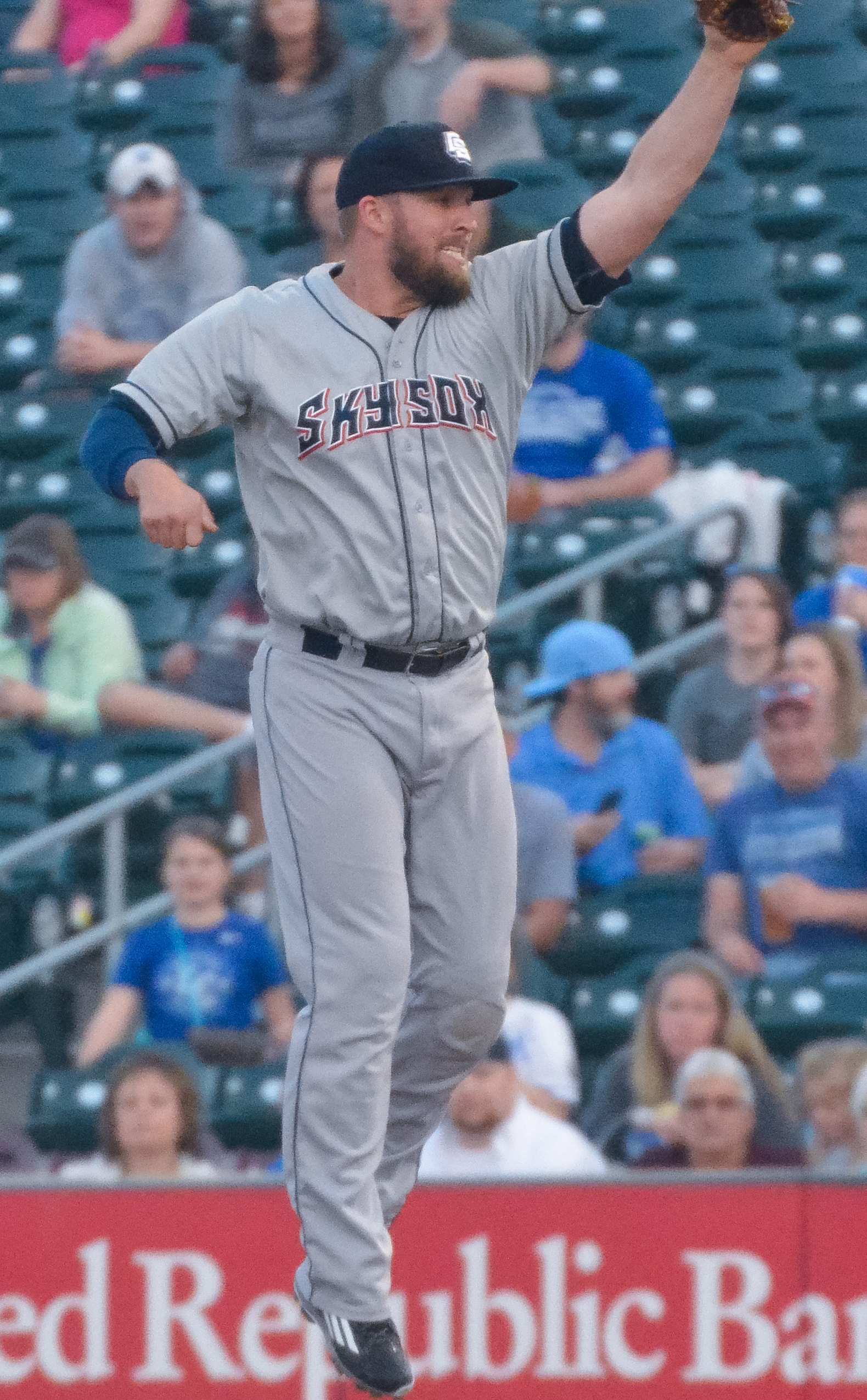
- Wilkins playing for the Colorado Springs Sky Sox, triple-A affiliates of the Brewers, in 2016
- First baseman
- Born: September 13, 1988 (age 37); Broken Arrow, Oklahoma, U.S.
- Batted: Left Threw: Right

MLB debut
- August 31, 2014, for the Chicago White Sox

Last MLB appearance
- August 16, 2016, for the Milwaukee Brewers

MLB statistics
- Batting average: .134
- Home runs: 1
- Runs batted in: 5
- Stats at Baseball Reference

Teams
- Chicago White Sox (2014); Milwaukee Brewers (2016)

Andrew Robert Wilkins (born September 13, 1988) is an American former professional baseball first baseman. He played in Major League Baseball (MLB) for the Chicago White Sox and Milwaukee Brewers.

== Amateur career ==
Wilkins graduated from Broken Arrow Senior High in Broken Arrow, Oklahoma in 2007. During his senior season, he batted .538 with 18 doubles, a triple and 12 home runs. He drove in 53 runs with a .635 on-base percentage and slugged 1.017. Wilkins was twice named to the Oklahoma All-State team, as well as the Louisville Slugger High School All-American team. He was selected by the Texas Rangers in the 25th round of the 2007 Major League Baseball draft. He did not sign and decided to attend the University of Arkansas the following year.

While playing for the Razorbacks, Wilkins lettered three times and helped lead the team to the 2009 College World Series, while being named to the all-tournament team and the Norman Regional's Most Outstanding Player. The summer before his junior year, he was named to the USA National Collegiate Baseball team. Later that summer, he also played with the Yarmouth-Dennis Red Sox of the Cape Cod League, where he led the team with 5 home runs and 26 runs batted in.

== Professional career ==
=== Chicago White Sox ===
Wilkins was drafted by the Chicago White Sox in the fifth round (158th overall) of the 2010 Major League Baseball draft. He was assigned to play for the Great Falls Voyagers in 2010 and was named a Pioneer League post-season all-star team. Wilkins began the 2011 season with the Winston-Salem Dash of the Carolina League. He was named Carolina League Player of the Week in May and was named to the 2011 Carolina League All-Star Team. He also participated in the 2011 California-Carolina League Home Run Derby. Wilkins finished the season with the Dash with a .278 batting average, 72 runs scored, 137 hits, 33 doubles, 23 home runs, 89 RBI, 91 strikeouts, and a .485 slugging percentage.

Wilkins played in eight spring training games for the White Sox in March and April 2012. After spring training, he was assigned to the Birmingham Barons, the Double-A affiliate of the White Sox. He hit .239 with 17 homers and 69 RBI. He returned to Birmingham to start 2013 and was in 67 games and hit .288 with 10 homers and 49 RBI. He was promoted to the Triple-A Charlotte Knights of the International League, where he hit .265 in 58 games with seven homers and 30 RBI.

In 2014 with Charlotte, Wilkins played in 127 games and batted .293 with 30 home runs and 85 RBI.

On August 31, 2014, the White Sox purchased his contract and promoted him to the major leagues. He was hitless in four at-bats with three strikeouts in his debut. His first hit was a double to right field off of Carlos Carrasco of the Cleveland Indians on September 7. In 17 games, Wilkins had six hits in 43 at-bats, with two doubles.

=== Toronto Blue Jays ===
Wilkins was claimed on waivers by the Toronto Blue Jays on March 29, 2015, and optioned to the Triple-A Buffalo Bisons. In 21 games, he hit .264 and he was then designated for assignment by the Blue Jays on May 2.

=== Los Angeles Dodgers ===
Wilkins was traded to the Los Angeles Dodgers for cash considerations on May 3, 2015. In 105 games for the Triple–A Oklahoma City Dodgers, Wilkins hit .249 with 18 home runs and 70 RBI. He was designated for assignment by the Dodgers on September 3.

=== Milwaukee Brewers ===
On September 6, 2015, Wilkins was claimed off waivers by the Baltimore Orioles. The Orioles designated him for assignment on November 25 and he was claimed off waivers by the Seattle Mariners on December 2. He was then claimed off waivers by the Texas Rangers on December 14. On December 23, Wilkins was claimed off waivers by the Milwaukee Brewers. He made 26 appearances for Milwaukee in 2016, going 3–for–24 (.125) with one home run and three RBI. On October 28, 2016, Wilkins was removed from the 40–man roster and sent outright to the Triple–A Colorado Springs SkySox. He elected free agency following the season on November 7.

=== Sugar Land Skeeters ===
On April 19, 2017, Wilkins signed with the Sugar Land Skeeters of the Atlantic League of Professional Baseball. In 43 games for the Skeeters, he hit .318/.406/.643 with 13 home runs and 34 RBI.

=== Minnesota Twins ===
On June 12, 2017, Wilkins signed a minor league deal with the Minnesota Twins. In 61 games for the Double–A Chattanooga Lookouts, he hit .254/.358/.474 with 12 home runs and 44 RBI. Wilkins elected free agency following the season on November 6.

On January 25, 2018, Wilkins re–signed with the Twins organization on a minor league contract. He played in 45 games split between Chattanooga and the Triple–A Rochester Red Wings, hitting .200/.349/.400 with nine home runs and 17 RBI. Wilkins elected free agency following the season on November 2.

=== Atlanta Braves ===
On January 19, 2019, Wilkins signed a minor league contract with the Atlanta Braves organization. He split the season between the rookie–level Gulf Coast League Braves, High–A Florida Fire Frogs, and Double–A Mississippi Braves. In 58 games for the three affiliates, Wilkins slashed .176/.285/.319 with seven home runs and 18 RBI. He elected free agency following the season on November 4.
