= Phil Stidham =

American baseball player (born 1968)

- Pitcher
- Born: November 18, 1968 (age 57); Tulsa, Oklahoma, U.S.
- Batted: Right Threw: Right

MLB debut
- June 4, 1994, for the Detroit Tigers

Last MLB appearance
- June 15, 1994, for the Detroit Tigers

MLB statistics
- Win–loss record: 0–0
- Earned run average: 24.92
- Strikeouts: 4
- Stats at Baseball Reference

Teams
- Detroit Tigers (1994)
Medals
Men's baseball
Representing United States
Goodwill Games
Bronze medal – third place	1990 Seattle	Team

Phillip Wayne Stidham (born November 18, 1968) is an American former professional baseball pitcher. Stidham played in Major League Baseball (MLB) for the Detroit Tigers in 1994.

Stidham attended Nathan Hale High School in Tulsa and then played four years of college baseball at Arkansas exclusively as a relief pitcher.
