= Jess Todd =

American baseball player (born 1986)

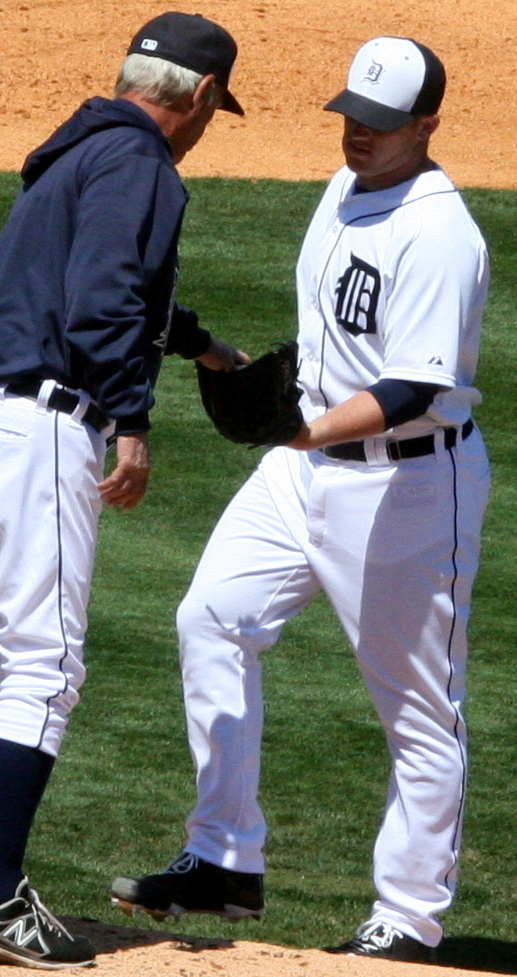
- Todd (right) with the Detroit Tigers in 2013
- Pitcher
- Born: April 20, 1986 (age 40); Longview, Texas, U.S.
- Batted: Right Threw: Right

MLB debut
- June 5, 2009, for the St. Louis Cardinals

Last MLB appearance
- July 29, 2010, for the Cleveland Indians

MLB statistics
- Win–loss record: 0–1
- Earned run average: 7.62
- Strikeouts: 29
- Stats at Baseball Reference

Teams
- St. Louis Cardinals (2009); Cleveland Indians (2009–2010)

Jesse Ray Todd (born April 20, 1986) is an American former professional baseball pitcher. Todd is 5 feet 11 inches (1.80 m) tall and weighs 210 pounds (95 kg).

The St. Louis Cardinals selected Todd in the second round (82nd overall) of the 2007 MLB draft out of the University of Arkansas. He made his Major League Baseball debut with the Cardinals in 2009, appearing for them in one game before joining the Cleveland Indians during the midseason.

In 2016, he opened a batting facility in Mount Pleasant, Texas.

== Playing career ==
=== College ===
Todd completed his first year of collegiate baseball at Navarro College in Corsicana, Texas. He transferred to the University of Arkansas for his sophomore year, where he worked under Dave van Horn. He completed his junior year as a Razorback before being selected 82nd overall in the 2007 Major League Baseball draft. Todd also played for the Kelowna Falcons, an independent summer baseball team in the West Coast League.

=== St. Louis Cardinals ===
Todd was named St. Louis Minor League pitcher of the year, and also achieved Texas League and Florida State League mid-season All-Star status. He played in the 2008 All-Star Futures Game in Yankee Stadium.

He made his major league debut on June 5, 2009, pitching 1 2/3 innings, giving up 2 runs, 3 hits including a home run, walking 2, and striking out 2.

=== Cleveland Indians ===
On July 26, 2009, Todd was sent to the Cleveland Indians to complete the June 27 trade that sent Mark DeRosa from the Indians to the St. Louis Cardinals.

After spending most of his time with the Triple-A Columbus Clippers and making limited appearances with the Indians in 2009 and 2010, Todd was designated for assignment on April 30, 2011, to make room on the 40-man roster for Alex White.

=== New York Yankees ===
He was claimed off waivers by the New York Yankees on May 6, 2011. However, he was designated for assignment on May 12.

=== Return to St. Louis ===
Todd was claimed off waivers by St. Louis on May 16, 2011. He was outrighted to Triple-A on June 11.

=== Detroit Tigers ===
Todd played in the Detroit Tigers organization in 2012.

=== Arizona Diamondbacks ===
Todd signed a minor league deal with the Arizona Diamondbacks in November 2013.

=== Boston Red Sox ===
In February 2015, Todd signed a minor league deal with the Boston Red Sox and was assigned to the Triple A Pawtucket Red Sox.
