= Jimmy Kremers =

American baseball player (born 1965)

- Catcher
- Born: October 8, 1965 (age 60); Little Rock, Arkansas, U.S.
- Batted: Left Threw: Right

MLB debut
- June 5, 1990, for the Atlanta Braves

Last MLB appearance
- October 3, 1990, for the Atlanta Braves

MLB statistics
- Batting average: .110
- Home runs: 1
- Runs batted in: 2
- Stats at Baseball Reference

Teams
- Atlanta Braves (1990)

James Edward Kremers (born October 8, 1965) is an American former catcher in Major League Baseball. He played for the Atlanta Braves in 1990.

In April 1991, Kremers was traded to the Montreal Expos for Otis Nixon, who would go on to steal 72 bases for the Braves as they won the 1991 National League pennant. Kremers played five more years in the minor leagues but never again reached the majors. He retired after the 1995 season.

Kremers played college baseball at the University of Arkansas.
