= Gerry Hannahs =

American baseball player (born 1952)

- Pitcher
- Born: March 6, 1952 (age 74); Binghamton, New York, U.S.
- Batted: Left Threw: Left

MLB debut
- September 8, 1976, for the Montreal Expos

Last MLB appearance
- September 27, 1979, for the Los Angeles Dodgers

MLB statistics
- Win–loss record: 3–7
- Earned run average: 5.07
- Strikeouts: 42
- Stats at Baseball Reference

Teams
- Montreal Expos (1976–1977); Los Angeles Dodgers (1978–1979)

Gerald Ellis Hannahs (born March 6, 1952) is an American former professional baseball pitcher who worked in 16 career games in Major League Baseball for the Montreal Expos and Los Angeles Dodgers in parts of four seasons between 1976 and 1979. A left-hander, he stood 6 feet 3 inches (1.91 m) tall and weighed 210 pounds (95 kg). He was born in Binghamton, New York.

== Career ==
Hannahs played college baseball for the University of Arkansas. He went undrafted and was signed as an amateur free agent by the Expos on July 5, 1974. In his third pro season, Hannahs posted a 20–6 won–lost record for Montreal's Double-A affiliate, the Québec Metros. He led the Eastern League in both victories and strikeouts. Recalled by Montreal in September, he started three games and defeated both the St. Louis Cardinals and New York Mets; in the latter contest, he allowed only one earned run in six innings pitched.

On April 16, 1977, Hannahs became the first Expos pitcher to earn a victory at Olympic Stadium, defeating the Philadelphia Phillies 4–3, and allowing three runs in 61/3 innings.

However, Hannahs' win that day, the third of his MLB career, would prove to be his last in the majors. He dropped his next seven decisions as a member of the Expos and Dodgers over his final 11 appearances. He retired from professional baseball in 1981. As a big-leaguer, he compiled a 3–7 won–lost mark and a 5.07 earned run average; he earned one save as a relief pitcher. In 71 innings pitched, he permitted 76 hits (including 11 home runs) and 42 bases on balls, recording an equal number of strikeouts.

His son, Dusty, named after Dusty Baker, played basketball for the Razorbacks and in the National Basketball Association, and now plays for Hapoel Tel Aviv B.C of the Israeli Basketball Premier League.
