= Matt Erickson =

American baseball player (born 1975)

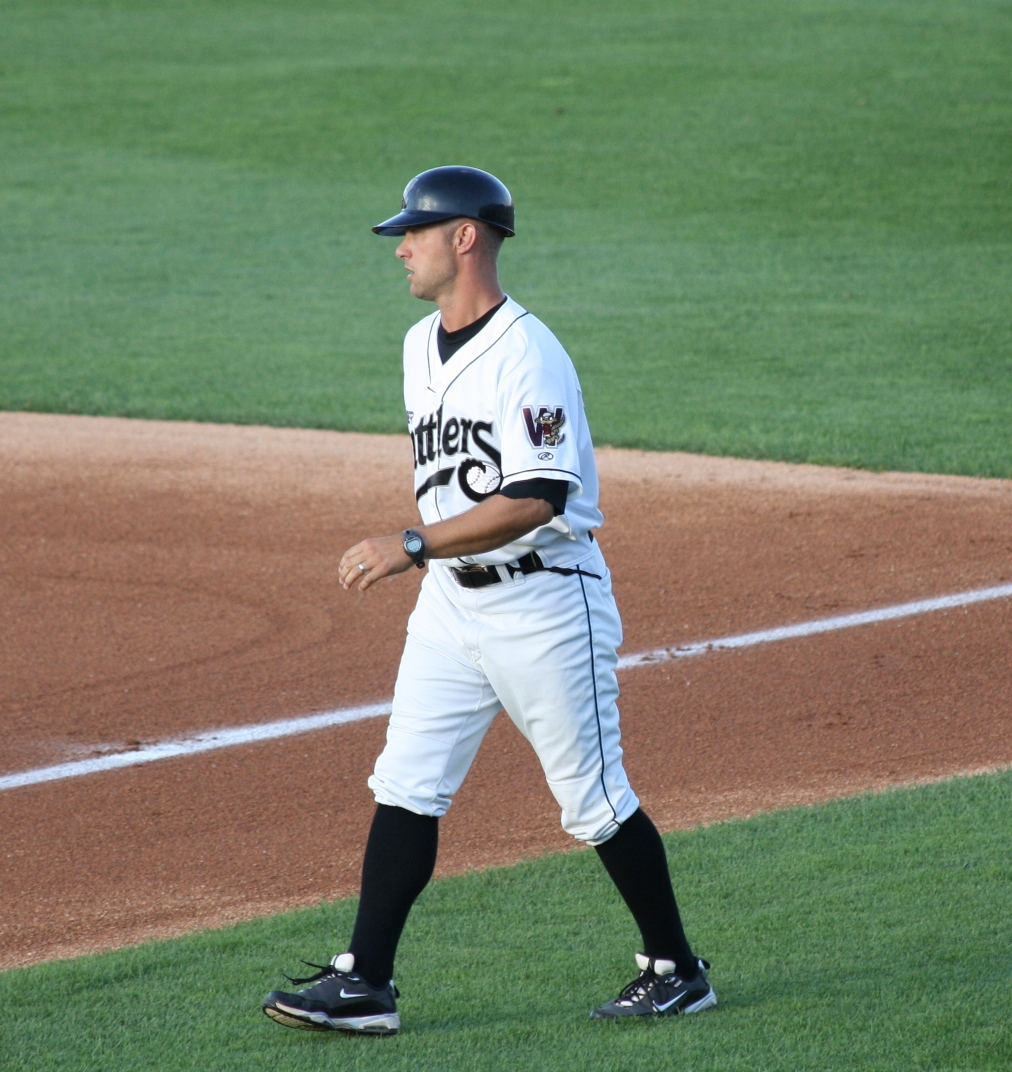
- Erickson with the Wisconsin Timber Rattlers

Milwaukee Brewers – No. 68
- Infielder / Coach
- Born: July 30, 1975 (age 51); Appleton, Wisconsin, U.S.
- Batted: Left Threw: Right

MLB debut
- July 9, 2004, for the Milwaukee Brewers

Last MLB appearance
- July 18, 2004, for the Milwaukee Brewers

MLB statistics
- Batting average: .167
- Home runs: 0
- Runs batted in: 0
- Stats at Baseball Reference

Teams
- As player: Milwaukee Brewers (2004); As coach: Milwaukee Brewers (2022–present)

Career highlights and awards
- World Series champion (2026)
Medals
Men's baseball
Representing United States
Baseball World Cup
Silver medal – second place	2001 Taipei	National team

Matthew Erickson (born July 30, 1975) is an American former professional baseball infielder who currently serves as the third base coach for the Milwaukee Brewers of Major League Baseball (MLB). From 2011 to 2021, he was manager of the Wisconsin Timber Rattlers, Milwaukee's Single-A affiliate.

== Playing career ==
Erickson played collegiate baseball for the University of Arkansas. In 1996, he played collegiate summer baseball with the Wareham Gatemen of the Cape Cod Baseball League. He was drafted by the Florida Marlins in the 7th round of the 1997 Major League Baseball draft, and later signed on December 19, 2003, as a minor league free agent with the Milwaukee Brewers after spending several seasons in the minor leagues within the Marlins organization.

Erickson was called up to the Brewers in 2004 where he played in four games, and went 1-for-6 with a base hit against Greg Maddux. On June 25, 2005, Erickson was released by the Brewers and signed with the Marlins on August 5, 2005. On February 8, 2006, Erickson signed a minor league contract with the Arizona Diamondbacks. Erickson became a free agent after the 2007 season.

== Coaching career ==
On December 3, 2008, Erickson was named the hitting coach for the Low-A Wisconsin Timber Rattlers in the Milwaukee Brewers organization. On January 8, 2011, he was selected to manage the Timber Rattlers.

Erickson was promoted to Milwaukee's major league coaching staff, in order to serve as their infield instructor and assistant hitting coach beginning in the 2022 season. On January 5, 2026, Erickson was named as the team's third base coach, replacing Jason Lane.
