= Scott Pose =

American baseball player

- Outfielder
- Born: February 11, 1967 (age 58); Davenport, Iowa, U.S.
- Batted: Left Threw: Right

MLB debut
- April 5, 1993, for the Florida Marlins

Last MLB appearance
- September 29, 2000, for the Kansas City Royals

MLB statistics
- Batting average: .240
- Hits: 75
- Run batted in: 21
- Stats at Baseball Reference

Teams
- Florida Marlins (1993); New York Yankees (1997); Kansas City Royals (1999–2000)

Scott Vernon Pose (/ˈpoʊz/; born February 11, 1967) is an American former professional baseball outfielder. He is an alumnus of Dowling Catholic High School in West Des Moines, Iowa and the University of Arkansas.

Drafted by the Cincinnati Reds in the 34th round of the 1989 Major League Baseball draft, Pose would make his Major League Baseball debut with the Florida Marlins on April 5, 1993, and appear in his final game on September 29, 2000.

Pose was a member of the inaugural Marlins 1993 franchise and was the first official batter in Marlins history. Nevertheless, he only appeared in 15 games with the expansion Marlins, as the bulk of his career playing time came later in the decade with the New York Yankees and Kansas City Royals. Pose's career season was in 1999, when he hit .285 as an outfield reserve with the Royals. Despite earning the praise of Royals Manager Tony Muser, Pose's playing time decreased in 2000, as he would start in only three games, appearing almost exclusively as a pinch hitter.

Pose portrayed the fictional baseball player "Matt Crane" in the 1999 film For Love of the Game starring Kevin Costner.

Since 2008, Pose has served as a college baseball analyst for the Big Ten Network.

Pose now provides color commentary for the Durham Bulls' television and radio broadcasts, with Patrick Kinas giving play-by-play commentary.
