= 2021 Vanderbilt Commodores baseball team =

American collegiate baseball team from Tennessee

2021 Vanderbilt Commodores baseball

Nashville Regional champions Nashville Super Regional champions

College World Series, Runners-up
- Conference: Southeastern Conference
- Eastern Division

Ranking
- Coaches: No. 2
- CB: No. 2
- Record: 49–18 (19–10 SEC)
- Head coach: Tim Corbin (19th season)
- Assistant coaches: Mike Baxter; Scott Brown
- Home stadium: Hawkins Field

2021 Southeastern Conference baseball standings
	Conf.				Overall
Team	W		L	PCT	W		L	PCT
Eastern
No. 6 Tennessee ^{x}‍‍‍^{y}	20	–	10	.667	50	–	18	.735
No. 2 Vanderbilt ‍‍‍^{y}	19	–	10	.655	49	–	18	.731
Florida ‍‍‍^{y}	17	–	13	.567	38	–	22	.633
South Carolina ‍‍‍^{y}	16	–	14	.533	34	–	23	.596
Georgia ‍‍‍	13	–	17	.433	31	–	25	.554
Kentucky ‍‍‍	12	–	18	.400	29	–	23	.558
Missouri ‍‍‍	8	–	22	.267	15	–	36	.294
Western
No. 5 Arkansas ^{x}‍†‍‡‍^{y}	22	–	8	.733	50	–	13	.794
No. 1 Mississippi State ‍‍‍^{y}	20	–	10	.667	50	–	18	.735
No. 13 Ole Miss ‍‍‍^{y}	18	–	12	.600	45	–	22	.672
No. 18 LSU ‍‍‍^{y}	13	–	17	.433	38	–	25	.603
Alabama ‍‍‍^{y}	12	–	17	.414	32	–	26	.552
Auburn ‍‍‍	10	–	20	.333	25	–	27	.481
Texas A&M ‍‍‍	9	–	21	.300	29	–	27	.518
x – Division champion † – Conference champion ‡ – Tournament champion y – Invited to the NCAA tournament As of June 30, 2021; Rankings from D1Baseball

The 2021 Vanderbilt Commodores baseball team represented Vanderbilt University during the 2021 NCAA Division I baseball season. Vanderbilt competed in the Eastern Division of the Southeastern Conference (SEC). The Commodores played their home games at Hawkins Field. Coach Tim Corbin led the Commodores in his 19th season with the program, reaching the 2021 College World Series finals, finishing as the national runner-up to No. 11 Mississippi State.

== Previous season ==
The Commodores finished 13–5 overall, and 0–0 in the conference. The season was prematurely cut short due to the COVID-19 pandemic.

== Roster ==
2021 Vanderbilt Commodores roster
Pitchers: 22 - Jack Leiter – Sophomore; 27 - Ethan Smith – Junior; 28 - Ryan Stefiuk – Freshman; 29 - Nick Maldonado – Sophomore; 30 - Nelson Berkwich – Freshman; 31 - Miles Garrett – Freshman; 32 - Hugh Fisher – Senior; 33 - Hunter Owen – Freshman; 35 - Chris McElvain – Sophomore; 40 - Sam Hliboki – Sophomore; 42 - Christian Little – Freshman; 43 - Michael Doolin – Sophomore; 44 - Donye Evans – Freshman; 46 - Gage Bradley – Freshman; 49 - Ryan Keenan – Sophomore; 50 - Luke Murphy – Junior; 66 - Thomas Schultz – Sophomore; 77 - Brett Hansen – Freshman; 80 - Kumar Rocker – Junior; 88 - Patrick Reilly – Freshman	Catchers: 5 - CJ Rodriguez – Sophomore; 45 - Alan Espinal – Freshman; 55 - Maxwell Romero Jr. – Sophomore; Infielders: 2 - Javier Vaz – Junior; 9 - Carter Young – Sophomore; 20 - Jack O'Dowd – Freshman; 25 - Park Noland – Sophomore; 39 - Gavin Casas – Freshman; 99 - Jayson Gonzalez – Senior	Outfielders: 3 - Cooper Davis – Senior; 8 - Isaiah Thomas – Junior; 11 - Matt Hogan – Junior; 19 - Troy LaNeve – Freshman; 21 - Calvin Hewett – Freshman; 51 - Enrique Bradfield – Freshman; Utility: 10 - T.J. McKenzie – Sophomore; 12 - Dominic Keegan – Junior; 16 - Jack Bulger – Freshman; 17 - C.J. Pittaro – Freshman; 18 - Will Duff – Sophomore; 34 - Spencer Jones – Sophomore

=== Coaching staff ===
2021 vanderbilt commodores coaching staff
Name	Position	Seasons at Vanderbilt	Alma mater
Tim Corbin	Head coach	19	Ohio Wesleyan (1984)
Scott Brown	Associate head coach	9	Cortland (1999)
Mike Baxter	Assistant Coach	4	Vanderbilt (2006)
David Macias	Volunteer Coach	4	Vanderbilt (2008)

== Schedule and results ==
Legend
	Vanderbilt win
	Vanderbilt loss
	Postponement
**Bold**	Vanderbilt team member

2021 Vanderbilt Commodores baseball game log (49–18)
Regular season (39–13)

February (6–1)
Date	Opponent	Rank	Site/stadium	Score	Win	Loss	Save	TV	Attendance	Overall record	SEC record
February 22	Wright State*	No. 4	Hawkins Field; Nashville, Tennessee	**W** 14–1	**Rocker (1–0)**	Schrand (0–1)	**McElvain (1)**	SECN+	178	1–0	—
February 22	Wright State*	No. 4	Hawkins Field	**W** 1–0	**Leiter (1–0)**	Brehmer (0–1)	**Smith (1)**	SECN+	178	2–0	—
February 24	Western Kentucky*	No. 3	Hawkins Field	**W** 12–1	**Little (1–0)**	Peter (0–1)	—	SECN+	140	3–0	—
February 26	Georgia State*	No. 3	Hawkins Field	**L** 2–4	Watson (1–0)	**Schultz (0–1)**	Treadway (1)	SECN+	149	3–1	—
February 27	Georgia State*	No. 3	Hawkins Field	**W** 5–4	**Garrett (1–0)**	Sweatt (0–1)	**Murphy (1)**	SECN+	164	4–1	—
February 28	Georgia State*	No. 3	Hawkins Field	**W** 12–2	**Rocker (2–0)**	Matela (0–2)	—	SECN+	163	5–1	—
February 28	Georgia State*	No. 3	Hawkins Field	**W** 17–6	**Leiter (2–0)**	Treadway (0–1)	—	SECN+	163	6–1	—

March (14–2)
Date	Opponent	Rank	Site/stadium	Score	Win	Loss	Save	TV	Attendance	Overall record	SEC record
March 5	UIC*	No. 2	Hawkins Field	**W** 15–0	**Schultz (1–1)**	Shears (0–2)	—	SECN+	350	7–1	—
March 6	UIC*	No. 2	Hawkins Field	**W** 5–2	**Rocker (3–0)**	Key (0–1)	**Murphy (2)**	SECN+	474	8–1	—
March 7	UIC*	No. 2	Hawkins Field	**W** 4–2	**Leiter (3–0)**	O'Reilly (0–1)	**Smith (2)**	SECN+	464	9–1	—
March 9	Memphis*	No. 2	Hawkins Field	**W** 10–4	**Reilly (1–0)**	Stinnett (2–2)	—	SECN+	399	10–1	—
March 12	at No. 13 Oklahoma State*	No. 2	O'Brate Stadium; Stillwater, Oklahoma	**W** 5–0	**Rocker (4–0)**	Parker (3–1)	—	ESPN+	3,480	11–1	—
March 13	at No. 13 Oklahoma State*	No. 2	O'Brate Stadium	**W** 18–4	**Leiter (4–0)**	Wrobleski (1–1)	—	B12N	3,480	12–1	—
March 14	at No. 13 Oklahoma State*	No. 2	O'Brate Stadium	**L** 6–10	Osmond (2–0)	**Schultz (1–2)**	—	ESPN+	3,296	12–2	—
March 16	vs. Belmont*	No. 2	First Horizon Park; Nashville, Tennessee	**W** 4–1	**Little (2–0)**	Borders (0–1)	**Maldonado (1)**	SECN+	456	13–2	—
March 19	No. 16 South Carolina	No. 2	Hawkins Field	**W** 3–2	**Rocker (5–0)**	Farr (2–1)	**Murphy (3)**	SECN	527	14–2	1–0
March 20	No. 16 South Carolina	No. 2	Hawkins Field	**W** 5–0	**Leiter (5–0)**	Brannon (1–2)	—	SECN	496	15–2	2–0
March 21	No. 16 South Carolina	No. 2	Hawkins Field	**L** 5–6	Kerry (2–0)	**Maldonado (0–1)**	—	SECN	496	15–3	2–1
March 23	Lipscomb*	No. 1	Hawkins Field	**W** 11–3	**Reilly (2–0)**	Thompson (0–2)	—	SECN+	474	16–3	—
March 25	at Missouri	No. 1	Taylor Stadium; Columbia, Missouri	**W** 10–2	**Rocker (6–0)**	Miles (1–4)	**Hliboki (1)**	SECN	600	17–3	3–1
March 26	at Missouri	No. 1	Taylor Stadium	**W** 11–3	**Leiter (6–0)**	Halvorsen (2–1)	—	SECN	600	18–3	4–1
March 27	at Missouri	No. 1	Taylor Stadium	**W** 3-1	**Schultz (2–2)**	Ash (1–1)	**Murphy (4)**	SECN	600	19–3	5–1
March 30	Tennessee Tech*	No. 1	Hawkins Field	**W** 12–5	**Reilly (3–0)**	Adams (0–2)	-	SECN+	610	20–3	—

April (12–4)
Date	Opponent	Rank	Site/stadium	Score	Win	Loss	Save	TV	Attendance	Overall record	SEC record
April 1	at No. 25 LSU	No. 1	Skip Bertman Field; Baton Rouge, Louisiana	**W** 13–1	**Rocker (7–0)**	Marceaux (2–3)	**Hliboki (2)**	SECN+	4,619	21–3	6–1
April 2	at No. 25 LSU	No. 1	Skip Bertman Field	**W** 11–2	**Leiter (7–0)**	Hill (2–3)	**Maldonado (2)**	ESPNU	4,904	22–3	7–1
April 3	at No. 25 LSU	No. 1	Skip Bertman Field	**W** 5–4	**Smith (1–0)**	Edwards (0–2)	**Murphy (5)**	SECN+	4,314	23–3	8–1
April 6	UT Martin*	No. 1	Hawkins Field	**W** 5–4	**McElvain (1–0)**	Petry (1–1)	**Murphy (6)**		636	24–3	—
April 8	No. 23 Georgia	No. 1	Hawkins Field	**L** 2–14	Pearson (2–0)	**Rocker (7–1)**	—	SECN	646	24–4	8–2
April 9	No. 23 Georgia	No. 1	Hawkins Field	**W** 5–2	**Maldonado (1–1)**	Pasqua (1–2)	—	SECN+	670	25–4	9–2
April 10	No. 23 Georgia	No. 1	Hawkins Field	**L** 1–9	Cannon (2–2)	**Reilly (3–1)**	—	SECN+	637	25–5	9–3
April 13	Eastern Kentucky*	No. 2	Hawkins Field	**W** 6–4	**Schultz (3–2)**	Abbott (1–2)	**Murphy (7)**	SECN+	411	26–5	—
April 16	at No. 5 Tennessee	No. 2	Lindsey Nelson Stadium; Knoxville, Tennessee	**W** 5–0	**Rocker (8–1)**	Dallas (5–1)	—	ESPNU	2,390	27–5	10–3
April 17	at No. 5 Tennessee	No. 2	Lindsey Nelson Stadium	**L** 4–8	Hunley (5–2)	**Murphy (0–1)**	—	SECN	2,263	27–6	10–4
April 18	at No. 5 Tennessee	No. 2	Lindsey Nelson Stadium	**W** 10–4	**McElvain (2–0)**	Tidwell (4–2)	—	SECN+	2,450	28–6	11–4
April 20	Austin Peay*	No. 2	Hawkins Field	**W** 7–0	**Schultz (4–2)**	McIllwain (0–2)	—	SECN+	788	29–6	—
April 23	No. 4 Mississippi State	No. 2	Hawkins Field	**W** 6–2	**Rocker** (9–1)	MacLeod (3–3)		SECN	1,407	30–6	12–4
April 24	No. 4 Mississippi State	No. 2	Hawkins Field	**L** 4–7	Bednar (3–1)	**Leiter** (7–1)		ESPNU	1,399	30–7	12–5
April 25	No. 4 Mississippi State	No. 2	Hawkins Field	**W** 7–4	**McElvain** (3–0)	Fristoe (3–3)	**Maldonado** (3)	SECN+	1,372	31–7	13–5
April 30	at No. 14 Florida	No. 2	Florida Ballpark; Gainesville, Florida	**W** 11–7	**Rocker** (10–1)	Aleman (1–2)		ESPNU	3,341	32–7	14–5

May (7–6)
Date	Opponent	Rank	Site/stadium	Score	Win	Loss	Save	TV	Attendance	Overall record	SEC record
May 1	at No. 14 Florida	No. 2	Florida Ballpark	**L** 8–11	Mace (5–0)	**Leiter** (7–2)		SECN+	0	32–8	14–6
May 2	at No. 14 Florida	No. 2	Florida Ballpark	**L** 3–5	Barco (7–2)	**McElvain** (3–1)	**Leftwich** (3)	ESPN2	2,986	32–9	14–7
May 4	at No. 11 Louisville*	No. 2	Jim Patterson Stadium; Louisville, Kentucky	**L** 2–7	Lohman (2–1)	**Little** (2–1)	Elliott (3)	ACCN+	880	32–10	
May 7	Alabama	No. 2	Hawkins Field	**W** 9–6	**Rocker** (11–1)	Ras (6–2)	**Maldonado** (4)	SECN+	1,562	33–10	15–7
May 8	Alabama	No. 2	Hawkins Field	**W** 6–2	**Reilly** (4–1)	Smith (1–6)		SECN+	1,550	34–10	16–7
May 9	Alabama	No. 2	Hawkins Field					SECN+			
May 11	North Alabama*	No. 2	Hawkins Field	**W** 3–2	**Berkwich** (1–0)	Best (1–10)	**Maldonado** (5)	SECN+	916	35–10	
May 14	at No. 14 Ole Miss	No. 2	Swayze Field; Oxford, Mississippi	**L** 1–3	Nikhazy (7–2)	**Rocker** (11–2)	Broadway (10)	SECN	8,986	35–11	16–8
May 15	at No. 14 Ole Miss	No. 2	Swayze Field	**W** 13–2	**Leiter** (8–2)	Diamond (3–4)	**McElvain** (2)	SECN+	10,267	36–11	17–8
May 16	at No. 14 Ole Miss	No. 2	Swayze Field	**L** 10–13	Kimbrell (5–0)	Reilly (4–2)		SECN+	8,479	36–12	17–9
May 18	FIU*	No. 3	Hawkins Field	**W** 20–4	**Little** (3–1)	Myrick (7–4)		SECN+	2,137	37–12	
May 20	Kentucky	No. 3	Hawkins Field	**W** 4–2	**Murphy** (1–1)	Harper (3–1)		SECN+	2,985	38–12	18–9
May 21	Kentucky	No. 3	Hawkins Field	**W** 8–2	**McElvain** (4–1)	Degen (2–1)		SECN+	3,323	39–12	19–9
May 22	Kentucky	No. 3	Hawkins Field	**L** 5–7	Harper (4–1)	**Maldonado** (1–2)	Hamey (6)	SECN+	3,262	39–13	19–10

Postseason (10–5)

SEC Tournament (1–2)
Date	Opponent	Seed	Site/stadium	Score	Win	Loss	Save	TV	Attendance	Overall record	SECT Record
May 26	vs. No. 12 (5) Ole Miss	No. 3 (4)	Hoover Metropolitan Stadium; Hoover, Alabama	**W** 5–4	**Murphy** (2–1)	Dougherty (1–2)	—	SECN	7,200	40–13	1–0
May 27	vs. No. 1 (1) Arkansas	No. 3 (4)	Hoover Metropolitan Stadium	**L** 4–6	Costeiu (7–2)	**Rocker** (11–3)	Kopps (9)	SECN	8,625	40–14	1–1
May 28	vs. No. 12 (5) Ole Miss	No. 3 (4)	Hoover Metropolitan Stadium	**L** 1–4	Myers (4–2)	**Leiter** (8–3)	Johnson (1)	SECN	5,901	40–15	1–2

NCAA Nashville Regional (3–0)
Date	Opponent	Seed	Site/stadium	Score	Win	Loss	Save	TV	Attendance	Overall record	NCAAT record
June 4	(4) Presbyterian	No. 4 (1)	Hawkins Field	**W** 10–0	**Rocker (12–3)**	McDaniel (4–3)	—	ESPN3	3,243	41–15	1–0
June 5	No. 21 (2) Georgia Tech	No. 4 (1)	Hawkins Field	**W** 4–3	**Leiter (9–3)**	Grissom (1–3)	**Maldonado (6)**	ESPN3	3,294	42–15	2–0
June 6	No. 21 (2) Georgia Tech	No. 4 (1)	Hawkins Field	**W** 14–11 ^{(11)}	**Murphy (3–1)**	Siegel (2–1)	**Maldonado (7)**	ESPN3	3,257	43–15	3–0

NCAA Nashville Super Regional (2–0)
Date	Opponent	Seed	Site/stadium	Score	Win	Loss	Save	TV	Attendance	Overall record	NCAAT record
June 11	No. 12 (13) East Carolina	No. 4 (4)	Hawkins Field	**W** 2–0	**Rocker** (13–3)	Williams (10–1)	**Murphy** (8)	ESPNU	3,510	44–15	4–0
June 12	No. 12 (13) East Carolina	No. 4 (4)	Hawkins Field	**W** 4–1	**Leiter** (10–3)	Wisenhunt (6–2)	**Maldonado** (8)	ESPNU	3,573	45–15	5–0

College World Series (4–3)
Date	Opponent	Seed	Site/stadium	Score	Win	Loss	Save	TV	Attendance	Overall record	NCAAT record
June 19	No. 5 (5) Arizona	No. 4 (4)	TD Ameritrade Park; Omaha, Nebraska	**W** 7–6 ^{(12)}	**McElvain (5–1)**	Vannelle (5–3)	—	ESPN	23,870	46–15	6–0
June 21	No. 16 NC State	No. 4 (4)	TD Ameritrade Park	**L** 0-1	Highfill (9-2)	**Leiter (10-4)**	Justice (13)	ESPN	23,712	46-16	6-1
June 23	No. 9 (9) Stanford	No. 4 (4)	TD Ameritrade Park	**W** 6-5	**Murphy (4-1)**	Beck (9-3)	—	ESPN	22,804	47-16	7-1
June 25	No. 16 NC State	No. 4 (4)	TD Ameritrade Park	**W** 3-1	**Rocker (14-3)**	Payne (0-1)	**Murphy** (9)	ESPN2	20,538	48-16	8-1
June 26	No. 16 NC State	No. 4 (4)	TD Ameritrade Park	No contest	—	—	—	—	—	48-16	8-1
June 28	No. 11 (7) Mississippi State	No. 4 (4)	TD Ameritrade Park	**W** 8-2	**Leiter (11-4)**	MacLeod (6-6)	**Maldonado** (9)	ESPN2	24,052	49-16	9-1
June 29	No. 11 (7) Mississippi State	No. 4 (4)	TD Ameritrade Park	**L** 2-13	Johnson (4-0)	**Little (3-2)**	—	ESPN	24,122	49-17	9-2
June 30	No. 11 (7) Mississippi State	No. 4 (4)	TD Ameritrade Park	**L** 0-9	Bednar (9-1)	**Rocker (14-4)**	Sims (13)	ESPN2	24,052	49-18	9-3

*Denotes non–conference game • Schedule source • Rankings based on the teams' current ranking in the D1Baseball poll

=== Nashville Regional ===
Nashville Regional Teams
(1) Vanderbilt Commodores	(2) Georgia Tech Yellow Jackets	(3) Indiana State Sycamores	(4) Presbyterian Blue Hose

Regional	Regional
1	**Vanderbilt**	**10**
4	Presbyterian	0
1	**Vanderbilt**	**4**
2	Georgia Tech	3
3	Indiana State	6
2	**Georgia Tech**	**7**
Nashville Regional – Hawkins Field
4	Presbyterian	2
3	**Indiana State**	**9**
3	Indiana State	0
2	**Georgia Tech**	**9**
1	**East Carolina**	**8**
4	Norfolk State	5
1	**East Carolina**	**7**
2	Charlotte	5
3	Maryland	10
2	**Charlotte**	**13**
Greenville Regional – Clark–LeClair Stadium
4	Norfolk State	0
3	**Maryland**	**16**
3	**Maryland**	**2**
2	Charlotte	1

Regional Final
1	**Vanderbilt**	**14**	–
2	Georgia Tech	11^{11}	–
1	**East Carolina**	**9**	–
3	Maryland	6	–

Super Regional
4	**Vanderbilt**	**2**	**4**	–
13	East Carolina	0	1	–

=== Nashville Super Regional ===
Nashville Super Regional Teams
(4) Vanderbilt Commodores	(13) East Carolina Pirates

=== College World Series ===
2021 College World Series Teams
NC State Wolfpack	(9) Stanford Cardinal	(5) Arizona Wildcats	(4) Vanderbilt Commodores	Virginia Cavaliers	(3) Tennessee Volunteers	(7) Mississippi State Bulldogs	(2) Texas Longhorns

First round	Second round
**NC State**	**10**
9	Stanford	4
**NC State**	**1**
4	Vanderbilt	0
5	Arizona	6
4	**Vanderbilt**	**7**^{12}
Bracket 1
9	**Stanford**	**14**
5	Arizona	5
9	Stanford	5
4	**Vanderbilt**	**6**
3	Tennessee	0
**Virginia**	**6**
Virginia	5
7	**Mississippi State**	**6**
7	**Mississippi State**	**2**
2	Texas	1
Bracket 2
3	Tennessee	4
2	**Texas**	**8**
2	**Texas**	**6**
Virginia	2

Semifinals
NC State	1	–
4	**Vanderbilt**	**3**	– (Note: Game declared no contest due to COVID-19 protocols with NC State. Vanderbilt advanced in the tournament.)
7	**Mississippi State**	5	**4**
2	Texas	**8**	3

Finals
4	Vanderbilt	**8**	2	0
7	**Mississippi State**	2	**13**	**9**

== Rankings ==
Ranking movements Legend: ██ Increase in ranking ██ Decrease in ranking ( ) = First-place votes
	Week																		
Poll	Pre	1	2	3	4	5	6	7	8	9	10	11	12	13	14	15	16	17	Final
Coaches'	3 (4)	3 (4)*	3	2 (10)	2 (6)	1 (22)	1 (23)	1 (31)	2 (1)	2 (2)	2 (4)	2	2 (1)	2	3	3			
Baseball America	6	4	3	3	3	3	2	2	6	3	2	3	2	2	2	2			
Collegiate Baseball^	2	2	2	2	2	1	1	1	2	2	2	2	2	2	2	2			
NCBWA†	4	2	2	2	2	2	1	1	2	2	2	3	2	3	3	4			
D1Baseball	4	3	2	2	2	1	1	1	2	2	2	2	2	3	3	4			2

^ Collegiate Baseball ranked 40 teams in their preseason poll, but only ranked 30 teams weekly during the season.
† NCBWA ranks 30 teams in their preseason poll, but only ranks 25 teams weekly during the season.
* A new poll was not released for this week, so for comparison purposes, the previous week's ranking is inserted in this week's slot.

== Record vs. conference opponents ==
Last two do not qualify for conf. tourn. Blank are not scheduled. Blue are home games, otherwise away.

2021 SEC baseball records Source: 2021 SEC baseball game results, 2021 SEC baseball schedule
Team	W–L	ALA	ARK	AUB	FLA	UGA	KEN	LSU	MSU	MIZZ	MISS	SCAR	TENN	TAMU	VAN	Team	Div	SR	SW
ALA	12–17		1–2	2–1	.	.	1–2	1–2	0–3	3–0	0–3	.	1–2	3–0	0–2	ALA	W5	3–7	2–2
ARK	22–8	2–1		2–1	3–0	2–1	.	2–1	3–0	.	2–1	2–1	2–1	2–1	.	ARK	W1	10–0	2–0
AUB	10–20	1–2	1–2		1–2	2–1	0–3	1–2	0–3	2–1	0–3	.	.	2–1	.	AUB	W6	3–7	0–3
FLA	17–13	.	0–3	2–1		2–1	2–1	.	.	3–0	2–1	0–3	1–2	3–0	2–1	FLA	E3	7–3	2–2
UGA	13–17	.	1–2	1–2	1–2		2–1	.	.	2–1	1–2	1–2	1–2	1–2	2–1	UGA	E5	3–7	0–0
KEN	12–18	2–1	.	3–0	1–2	1–2		1–2	0–3	2–1	.	0–3	1–2	.	1–2	KEN	E6	3–7	1–2
LSU	13–17	2–1	1–2	2–1	.	.	2–1		1–2	.	2–1	1–2	0–3	2–1	0–3	LSU	W4	5–5	0–2
MSU	20–10	3–0	0–3	3–0	.	.	3–0	2–1		1–2	2–1	2–1	.	3–0	1–2	MSU	W2	7–3	4–1
MIZZ	8–22	0–3	.	1–2	0–3	1–2	1–2	.	2–1		.	1–2	0–3	2–1	0–3	MIZZ	E7	2–8	0–4
MISS	18–12	3–0	1–2	3–0	1–2	2–1	.	1–2	1–2	.		3–0	.	1–2	2–1	MISS	W3	5–5	3–0
SCAR	16–14	.	1–2	.	3–0	2–1	3–0	2–1	1–2	2–1	0–3		1–2	.	1–2	SCAR	E4	5–5	2–1
TENN	20–10	2–1	1–2	.	2–1	2–1	2–1	3–0	.	3–0	.	2–1		2–1	1–2	TENN	E1	8–2	2–0
TAMU	9–21	0–3	1–2	1–2	0–3	2–1	.	1–2	0–3	1–2	2–1	.	1–2		.	TAMU	W7	2–8	0–3
VAN	19–10	2–0	.	.	1–2	1–2	2–1	3–0	2–1	3–0	1–2	2–1	2–1	.		VAN	E2	7–3	2–0
Team	W–L	ALA	ARK	AUB	FLA	UGA	KEN	LSU	MSU	MIZZ	MISS	SCAR	TENN	TAMU	VAN	Team	Div	SR	SW

Updated for entire regular season.

== 2021 MLB draft ==
Player	Position	Round	Overall	MLB team
Jack Leiter	RHP	1	2	Texas Rangers
Kumar Rocker	RHP	1	10	New York Mets
Luke Murphy	RHP	4	110	Los Angeles Angels
CJ Rodriguez	C	5	158	Oakland Athletics
Hugh Fisher	LHP	10	288	Arizona Diamondbacks
Jayson Gonzalez	RHP	17	515	Chicago White Sox
Dominic Keegan	UTIL	19	573	New York Yankees

†Rocker did not sign with the Mets, but did not return to Vanderbilt. Keegan did not sign with the Yankees and returned to Vanderbilt.
