= 2021 Georgia Bulldogs baseball team =

American college baseball season

2021 Georgia Bulldogs baseball
- Conference: Southeastern Conference
- Eastern Division
- CB: No. 21
- Record: 31-25 (13-17 SEC)
- Head coach: Scott Stricklin (8th season)
- Assistant coaches: Scott Daeley (8th season); Sean Kenny (4th season)
- Home stadium: Foley Field

2021 Southeastern Conference baseball standings
	Conf.				Overall
Team	W		L	PCT	W		L	PCT
Eastern
No. 6 Tennessee ^{x}‍‍‍^{y}	20	–	10	.667	50	–	18	.735
No. 2 Vanderbilt ‍‍‍^{y}	19	–	10	.655	49	–	18	.731
Florida ‍‍‍^{y}	17	–	13	.567	38	–	22	.633
South Carolina ‍‍‍^{y}	16	–	14	.533	34	–	23	.596
Georgia ‍‍‍	13	–	17	.433	31	–	25	.554
Kentucky ‍‍‍	12	–	18	.400	29	–	23	.558
Missouri ‍‍‍	8	–	22	.267	15	–	36	.294
Western
No. 5 Arkansas ^{x}‍†‍‡‍^{y}	22	–	8	.733	50	–	13	.794
No. 1 Mississippi State ‍‍‍^{y}	20	–	10	.667	50	–	18	.735
No. 13 Ole Miss ‍‍‍^{y}	18	–	12	.600	45	–	22	.672
No. 18 LSU ‍‍‍^{y}	13	–	17	.433	38	–	25	.603
Alabama ‍‍‍^{y}	12	–	17	.414	32	–	26	.552
Auburn ‍‍‍	10	–	20	.333	25	–	27	.481
Texas A&M ‍‍‍	9	–	21	.300	29	–	27	.518
x – Division champion † – Conference champion ‡ – Tournament champion y – Invited to the NCAA tournament As of June 30, 2021; Rankings from D1Baseball

The 2021 Georgia Bulldogs baseball team represented the University of Georgia during the 2021 NCAA Division I baseball season. The Bulldogs played their home games at Foley Field as a member of the Southeastern Conference They were led by head coach Scott Stricklin, in his eight year as head coach.

== Previous season ==
The 2020 Georgia Bulldogs baseball team notched a 14–4 (0–0) regular-season record. The season prematurely ended on March 12, 2020, due to concerns over the COVID-19 pandemic.

== Personnel ==
=== Roster ===
2021 Georgia Bulldogs roster
Pitchers: 3 - Brandon Smith - (redshirt) Freshman; 5 - C.J. Smith - Senior; 11 - Nolan Crisp - (redshirt) Sophomore; 12 - Jonathan Cannon - Sophomore; 16 - Will Childers - Sophomore; 17 - Jaden Woods - Freshman; 18 - Bryce Melear - (redshirt) Freshman; 19 - Jack Gowen - Junior; 21 - Logan Moody - (redshirt) Senior; 29 - Charlie Goldstein - (redshirt) Freshman; 32 - Michael Polk - Sophomore; 33 - Patrick Holloman - Freshman; 34 - Garrett Brown - (redshirt) Sophomore; 35 - Hank Bearden - Freshman; 39 - Darryn Pasqua - (redshirt) Junior; 43 - Max DeJong - Freshman; 46 - Will Pearson - Freshman; 47 - Collin Caldwell - Freshman; 55 - Ryan Webb - Senior	Catchers: 2 - Shane Marshall - Junior; 6 - Corey Collins - Freshman; 13 - Fernando Gonzalez - Freshman; 30 - Mason Meadows - (redshirt) Senior; Infielders: 1 - Buddy Floyd - Sophomore; 7 - Garrett Spikes - Freshman; 8 - Parks Harber - Freshman; 9 - Kameron Guidry - (redshirt) Freshman; 15 - Cole Tate - Senior; 23 - Connor Tate - (redshirt) Junior; 24 - Garrett Blaylock - Senior; 28 - Joshua McAllister - (redshirt) Junior; 42 - Caleb Ketchup - Freshman; 88 - Ryland Goede - (redshirt) Freshman	Outfielders: 4 - Randon Jernigan - Junior; 22 - Dwight Allen - Freshman; 26 - Trippe Moore III - Freshman; 44 - Ben Anderson - (redshirt) Junior; Utility: 0 - Josh Stinson (OF/INF) - (redshirt) Freshman; 14 - Liam Sullivan (P/OF) - Freshman; 20 - Chaney Rogers (OF/1B) - Senior; 25 - Lane Watkins (OF/C/1B) - (redshirt) Freshman; 27 - Luke Wagner (P/OF) - Freshman; 31 - Riley King (INF/OF) - (redshirt) Senior; 41 - Ben Harris (OF/P) - (redshirt) Sophomore

=== Coaching staff ===
2021 Georgia Bulldogs coaching staff
Name	Position	Seasons at Georgia	Alma mater
Scott Stricklin	Head coach	8	Kent state (1995)
Scott Daeley	Associate head coach/recruiting coordinator	8	Wake Forest (2002)
Sean Kenny	Assistant coach/pitching	4	Eastern Michigan (1997)
Brock Bennett	Volunteer coach	2	Alabama (2011)

== Game log ==
2021 Georgia Bulldogs baseball game log
Legend: = Win = Loss = Canceled Bold = Georgia team member
Regular season (23–12)

February (7–1)
Date	Time (ET)	TV	Opponent	Rank	Stadium	Score	Win	Loss	Save	Attendance	Overall	SEC	Sources
February 19	2:00 p.m.	SECN+	Evansville*	No. 7	Foley Field; Athens, Georgia	**L** 2–3	Gray (1–0)	**Smith (0–1)**	Meyer (1)	664	0–1	—	Box Score; Recap
February 20	12:00 p.m.	SECN+	Evansville*	No. 7	Foley Field	**W** 7–3	**Wagner (1–0)**	Croner (0–1)	**Caldwell (1)**	664	1–1	—	Box Score; Recap
February 20	3:00 p.m.	SECN+	Evansville*	No. 7	Foley Field	**W** 6–5	**Pearson (1–0)**	Kressin (0–1)	—	664	2–1	—	Box Score; Recap
February 21	3:00 p.m.	SECN+	Evansville*	No. 7	Foley Field	**W** 4–1	**Bearden (1–0)**	Schultz (0–1)	**Pearson (1)**	664	3–1	—	Box Score; Recap
February 24	3:00 p.m.	SECN+	at Georgia State*	No. 5	GSU Baseball Complex; Decatur, Georgia	**W** 6–2	**Pasqua (1–0)**	Patel (0–2)	—	249	4–1	—	Box Score; Recap
February 26	6:00 p.m.	SECN+	Gardner–Webb*	No. 5	Foley Field	**W** 3–2	**Gowen (1–0)**	Washington (0–1)	—	664	5–1	—	Box Score; Recap
February 27	1:00 p.m.	SECN+	Gardner–Webb*	No. 5	Foley Field	**W** 5–1	**Wagner (2–0)**	Campbell (0–1)	Caldwell (2)	664	6–1	—	Box Score; Recap
February 28	1:00 p.m.	SECN+	Gardner–Webb*	No. 5	Foley Field	**W** 17–3	**Sullivan (1–0)**	Young (0–2)	—	664	7–1	—	Box Score; Recap

March
Date	Time (ET)	TV	Opponent	Rank	Stadium	Score	Win	Loss	Save	Attendance	Overall	SEC	Sources
March 3	5:00 p.m.	SECN+	Kennesaw State*	No. 7	Foley Field	**L** 4–6	Rine (1–0)	**Caldwell (0–1)**	Johnson (3)	120	7–2	—	Box Score; Recap
March 5			North Florida*	No. 7	Foley Field							—	
March 6			North Florida*	No. 7	Foley Field							—	
March 7			North Florida*	No. 7	Foley Field							—	
March 9			at Georgia Southern*	No. 7	J. I. Clements Stadium; Statesboro, Georgia							—	
March 12			Lipscomb*	No. 7	Foley Field							—	
March 13			Lipscomb*	No. 7	Foley Field							—	
March 14			Lipscomb*	No. 7	Foley Field							—	
March 16			vs. Wofford*	No. 7	Fluor Field; Greenville, South Carolina	Postponed (inclement weather)						—	Report
March 19			No. 10 Tennessee	No. 7	Foley Field								
March 20			No. 10 Tennessee	No. 7	Foley Field								
March 21			No. 10 Tennessee	No. 7	Foley Field								
March 23			Kennesaw State*	No. 12	Foley Field							—	
March 26			at Texas A&M	No. 12	Olsen Field; College Station, Texas								
March 27			at Texas A&M	No. 12	Olsen Field								
March 28			at Texas A&M	No. 12	Olsen Field								
March 30			at Clemson*	No. 23	Doug Kingsmore Stadium; Clemson, South Carolina							—	

April
Date	Time (ET)	TV	Opponent	Rank	Stadium	Score	Win	Loss	Save	Attendance	Overall	SEC	Sources
April 2			No. 14 South Carolina	No. 23	Foley Field								
April 3			No. 14 South Carolina	No. 23	Foley Field								
April 4			No. 14 South Carolina	No. 23	Foley Field								
April 6			Georgia Southern*	No. 23	Foley Field							—	
April 8			at No. 1 Vanderbilt	No. 23	Hawkins Field; Nashville, Tennessee								
April 9			at No. 1 Vanderbilt	No. 23	Hawkins Field								
April 10			at No. 1 Vanderbilt	No. 23	Hawkins Field								
April 13			Georgia State*	No. 20	Foley Field							—	
April 16			Kentucky	No. 20	Foley Field								
April 17			Kentucky	No. 20	Foley Field								
April 18			Kentucky	No. 20	Foley Field								
April 20			Clemson*	No. 21	Foley Field							—	
April 23			at Missouri	No. 21	Taylor Stadium; Columbia, Missouri								
April 24			at Missouri	No. 21	Taylor Stadium								
April 25			at Missouri	No. 21	Taylor Stadium								
April 27			Georgia Tech*; Clean, Old-Fashioned Hate		Foley Field							—	
April 29			Auburn		Foley Field								
April 30			Auburn		Foley Field								

May
Date	Time (ET)	TV	Opponent	Rank	Stadium	Score	Win	Loss	Save	Attendance	Overall	SEC	Sources
May 1			Auburn		Foley Field								
May 7			at Arkansas		Baum–Walker Stadium; Fayetteville, Arkansas								
May 8			at Arkansas		Baum–Walker Stadium								
May 9			at Arkansas		Baum–Walker Stadium								
May 14			at Florida		Florida Ballpark; Gainesville, Florida								
May 15			at Florida		Florida Ballpark								
May 16			at Florida		Florida Ballpark								
May 18			at Georgia Tech*; Clean, Old-Fashioned Hate		Russ Chandler Stadium; Atlanta, Georgia							—	
May 20			Ole Miss		Foley Field								
May 21			Ole Miss		Foley Field								
May 22			Ole Miss		Foley Field								

Post-Season

SEC Tournament
Date	Time (ET)	TV	Opponent	Rank	Stadium	Score	Win	Loss	Save	Attendance	Overall	SEC	Sources

NCAA Tournament
Date	Time (ET)	TV	Opponent	Rank	Stadium	Score	Win	Loss	Save	Attendance	Overall	SEC	Sources

*Denotes non–conference game • Schedule source • Rankings based on the teams' current ranking in the Collegiate Baseball poll

== Rankings ==
Ranking movements Legend: ██ Increase in ranking ██ Decrease in ranking — = Not ranked RV = Received votes
	Week																		
Poll	Pre	1	2	3	4	5	6	7	8	9	10	11	12	13	14	15	16	17	Final
Coaches'	24	24*	21	21	RV	RV	—	—	RV	RV									
Baseball America	—	—	—	—	—	—	—	—	—	—									
Collegiate Baseball^	12	7	5	7	7	12	23	23	20	21									
NCBWA†	24	23	20	26	23	30	RV	RV	30	RV									
D1Baseball	—	—	—	—	—	—	—	—	—	—									

^ Collegiate Baseball ranked 40 teams in their preseason poll, but only ranked 30 teams weekly during the season.
† NCBWA ranks 30 teams in their preseason poll, but only ranks 25 teams weekly during the season.
* A new poll was not released for this week, so for comparison purposes, the previous week's ranking is inserted in this week's slot.

== Record vs. conference opponents ==
Last two do not qualify for conf. tourn. Blank are not scheduled. Blue are home games, otherwise away.

2021 SEC baseball records Source: 2021 SEC baseball game results, 2021 SEC baseball schedule
Team	W–L	ALA	ARK	AUB	FLA	UGA	KEN	LSU	MSU	MIZZ	MISS	SCAR	TENN	TAMU	VAN	Team	Div	SR	SW
ALA	12–17		1–2	2–1	.	.	1–2	1–2	0–3	3–0	0–3	.	1–2	3–0	0–2	ALA	W5	3–7	2–2
ARK	22–8	2–1		2–1	3–0	2–1	.	2–1	3–0	.	2–1	2–1	2–1	2–1	.	ARK	W1	10–0	2–0
AUB	10–20	1–2	1–2		1–2	2–1	0–3	1–2	0–3	2–1	0–3	.	.	2–1	.	AUB	W6	3–7	0–3
FLA	17–13	.	0–3	2–1		2–1	2–1	.	.	3–0	2–1	0–3	1–2	3–0	2–1	FLA	E3	7–3	2–2
UGA	13–17	.	1–2	1–2	1–2		2–1	.	.	2–1	1–2	1–2	1–2	1–2	2–1	UGA	E5	3–7	0–0
KEN	12–18	2–1	.	3–0	1–2	1–2		1–2	0–3	2–1	.	0–3	1–2	.	1–2	KEN	E6	3–7	1–2
LSU	13–17	2–1	1–2	2–1	.	.	2–1		1–2	.	2–1	1–2	0–3	2–1	0–3	LSU	W4	5–5	0–2
MSU	20–10	3–0	0–3	3–0	.	.	3–0	2–1		1–2	2–1	2–1	.	3–0	1–2	MSU	W2	7–3	4–1
MIZZ	8–22	0–3	.	1–2	0–3	1–2	1–2	.	2–1		.	1–2	0–3	2–1	0–3	MIZZ	E7	2–8	0–4
MISS	18–12	3–0	1–2	3–0	1–2	2–1	.	1–2	1–2	.		3–0	.	1–2	2–1	MISS	W3	5–5	3–0
SCAR	16–14	.	1–2	.	3–0	2–1	3–0	2–1	1–2	2–1	0–3		1–2	.	1–2	SCAR	E4	5–5	2–1
TENN	20–10	2–1	1–2	.	2–1	2–1	2–1	3–0	.	3–0	.	2–1		2–1	1–2	TENN	E1	8–2	2–0
TAMU	9–21	0–3	1–2	1–2	0–3	2–1	.	1–2	0–3	1–2	2–1	.	1–2		.	TAMU	W7	2–8	0–3
VAN	19–10	2–0	.	.	1–2	1–2	2–1	3–0	2–1	3–0	1–2	2–1	2–1	.		VAN	E2	7–3	2–0
Team	W–L	ALA	ARK	AUB	FLA	UGA	KEN	LSU	MSU	MIZZ	MISS	SCAR	TENN	TAMU	VAN	Team	Div	SR	SW

Updated for entire regular season.

== 2021 MLB draft ==
Player	Position	Round	Overall	MLB team
Ryan Webb	LHP	4	125	Cleveland Indians
Ben Harris	LHP	8	252	Los Angeles Dodgers
