= 2021 Auburn Tigers baseball team =

American college baseball season

2021 Auburn Tigers baseball
- Conference: Southeastern Conference
- Western Division
- Record: 25–27 (10–20 SEC)
- Head coach: Butch Thompson (6th season)
- Assistant coaches: Gabe Gross; Karl Nonemaker
- Home stadium: Plainsman Park

2021 Southeastern Conference baseball standings
	Conf.				Overall
Team	W		L	PCT	W		L	PCT
Eastern
No. 6 Tennessee ^{x}‍‍‍^{y}	20	–	10	.667	50	–	18	.735
No. 2 Vanderbilt ‍‍‍^{y}	19	–	10	.655	49	–	18	.731
Florida ‍‍‍^{y}	17	–	13	.567	38	–	22	.633
South Carolina ‍‍‍^{y}	16	–	14	.533	34	–	23	.596
Georgia ‍‍‍	13	–	17	.433	31	–	25	.554
Kentucky ‍‍‍	12	–	18	.400	29	–	23	.558
Missouri ‍‍‍	8	–	22	.267	15	–	36	.294
Western
No. 5 Arkansas ^{x}‍†‍‡‍^{y}	22	–	8	.733	50	–	13	.794
No. 1 Mississippi State ‍‍‍^{y}	20	–	10	.667	50	–	18	.735
No. 13 Ole Miss ‍‍‍^{y}	18	–	12	.600	45	–	22	.672
No. 18 LSU ‍‍‍^{y}	13	–	17	.433	38	–	25	.603
Alabama ‍‍‍^{y}	12	–	17	.414	32	–	26	.552
Auburn ‍‍‍	10	–	20	.333	25	–	27	.481
Texas A&M ‍‍‍	9	–	21	.300	29	–	27	.518
x – Division champion † – Conference champion ‡ – Tournament champion y – Invited to the NCAA tournament As of June 30, 2021; Rankings from D1Baseball

The 2021 Auburn Tigers baseball team represented Auburn University in the 2021 NCAA Division I baseball season. The Tigers played their home games at Plainsman Park.

== Previous season ==
The Tigers notched a 13–5 (0–0) overall record, placing 6th in the SEC Western Division. The season was prematurely cut short because of the COVID-19 pandemic.

== Schedule and results ==
2021 Auburn Tigers baseball game log (25–27)
Regular season (25–26)

February (6–2)
Date	Opponent	Rank	Site/stadium	Score	Win	Loss	Save	TV	Attendance	Overall record	SEC record
February 19	Presbyterian*	No. 23	Plainsman Park	**W** 14–3	**Greenhill** (1–0)	Miles (0–1)	None		850	1–0	–
February 20	Presbyterian*	No. 23	Plainsman Park	**W** 6–1	**Mullins** (1–0)	Flood (0–1)	None			2–0	–
February 21	Presbyterian*	No. 23	Plainsman Park	**W** 2–1 (10)	**Hill** (1–0)	Paradis (0–1)	None			3–0	–
February 23	Alabama A&M*	No. 21	Plainsman Park	**W** 18-2 (7)	**Bright** (1–0)	Febus (0–1)	None			4–0	–
February 24	Alabama A&M*	No. 21	Plainsman Park	**W** 33–0	**Sokol** (1–0)	Smith (0–1)	None			5–0	–
Round Rock Classic
February 26	vs. Oklahoma*	No. 21	Dell Diamond; Round Rock, TX	**L** 3–4 (10)	Ruffcorn (1–0	**Thomas** (0–1)	None			5–1	–
February 27	vs. Baylor*	No. 21	Dell Diamond	**L** 6–12	Thomas (1–0)	**Fitts** (0–1)	None			5–2	–
February 28	vs. Texas A&M*	No. 21	Dell Diamond	**W** 6–1	**Bright** (2–0)	Childress (0–1)	None			6–2	–

March (5–9)
Date	Opponent	Rank	Site/stadium	Score	Win	Loss	Save	TV	Attendance	Overall record	SEC record
March 2	Jacksonville State*		Plainsman Park	Postponed							
March 5	No. 22 Boston College*		Plainsman Park	**L** 2–8	Pelio (2–1)	**Fitts** (0–2)	Walsh (3)			6–3	–
March 6	No. 22 Boston College*		Plainsman Park	**W** 16–1	**Barnett** (1–0)	Sheehan (2–1)	None			7–3	–
March 7	No. 22 Boston College*		Plainsman Park	**L** 9–11 (10)	Walsh (1–0)	**Glavine** (0–1)	None			7–4	–
March 9	at UAB*		Regions Field; Birmingham, AL	**W** 6–5	**Mullins** (2–1)	Cunningham (1–2)	None		1,954	8–4	–
March 12	Little Rock*		Plainsman Park	**W** 7–0	**Greenhill** (2–0)	Funk (0–2)	None			9–4	–
March 13	Little Rock*		Plainsman Park	**W** 6–1	**Barnett** (2–0)	Arnold (1–2)	None			10–4	–
March 14	Little Rock*		Plainsman Park	**L** 6–12	Barkley (3–0)	**Bright** (2–1)	None			10–5	–
March 16	at Lipscomb*		Dugan Field; Nashville, TN	**W** 9–7	**Swilling** (1–0)	Bierman (0–2)	**Fitts** (1)		417	11–5	–
March 19	at No. 4 Ole Miss		Swayze Field; Oxford, MS	**L** 0–1	Hoglund (3–0)	**Gonzalez** (0–1)	Broadway (2)		9,358	11–6	0–1
March 20	at No. 4 Ole Miss		Swayze Field	**L** 5–6	McDaniel (3–0)	**Barnett** (2–1)	Broadway (3)		10,304	11–7	0–2
March 21	at No. 4 Ole Miss		Swayze Field	**L** 11–19	Diamond (2–2)	**Bright** (2–2)	None		8,725	11–8	0–3
March 23	South Alabama*		Plainsman Park	Postponed							
March 26	Kentucky		Plainsman Park	**L** 6–8 (10)	Harper (2–0)	**Fitts** (0–3)	None			11–9	0–4
March 27 (DH 1)	Kentucky		Plainsman Park	**L** 6–7	Strickland (1–0	**Owen** (0–1)	None			11–10	0–5
March 27 (DH 2)	Kentucky		Plainsman Park	**L** 4–6	Lee (2–1)	**Gonzalez** (0–2)	Jones (1)			11–11	0–6

April (7–10)
Date	Opponent	Rank	Site/stadium	Score	Win	Loss	Save	TV	Attendance	Overall record	SEC record
April 1	at No. 2 Arkansas		Baum–Walker Stadium; Fayetteville, AR	**W** 2–1	**Greenhill** (3–0)	Wicklander (1–1)	**Barnett** (1)		4,692	12–11	1–6
April 2	at No. 2 Arkansas		Baum–Walker Stadium	**L** 5–6	Wiggins (2–0)	**Swilling** (1–1)	Kopps (3)		6,585	12–12	1–7
April 3	at No. 2 Arkansas		Baum–Walker Stadium	**L** 5–6 (10)	Wiggins (3–0)	**Bright** (2–3)	None		6,585	12–13	1–8
April 6	Kennesaw State*		Plainsman Park	Postponed							
April 9	No. 5 Mississippi State		Plainsman Park	**L** 5–6	Smith (4–1)	**Skipper** (0–1)	Sims (1)			12–14	1–9
April 10	No. 5 Mississippi State		Plainsman Park	**L** 2–7	Bednar (2–0)	**Owen** (0–2)	None		1,267	12–15	1–10
April 11	No. 5 Mississippi State		Plainsman Park	**L** 10–19	Harding (3–1)	**Gonzalez** (0–3)	None		1,126	12–16	1–11
April 13	at Georgia Tech*		Russ Chandler Stadium; Atlanta, GA	**W** 7–3	**Bright** (3–3)	Grissom (0–1)	None		713	13–16	1–11
April 15	at Alabama		Sewell–Thomas Stadium; Tuscaloosa, AL	**L** 7–8 (10)	Green (3–0)	**Skipper** (0–2)	None		2,003	13–17	1–12
April 16	at Alabama		Sewell–Thomas Stadium	**W** 5–4	**Owen** (1–2)	Smith (0–4)	**Swilling** (1)		2,630	14–17	2–12
April 17	at Alabama		Sewell–Thomas Stadium	**L** 9–10	Lee (5–0)	**Barnett** (2–2)	None		2,630	14–18	2–13
April 20	Samford*		Plainsman Park	**W** 6–4	**Glavine** (1–1)	Cravey (0–2)	**Greenhill** (1)		1,111	15–18	2–13
April 21	Jacksonville State*		Plainsman Park	**W** 8–7 (10)	**Hill** (2–0)	Downey (1–1)	None		920	16–18	2–13
April 23	No. 15 Florida		Plainsman Park	**L** 2–4	Scott (3–2)	**Bright** (3–4)	Leftwich (1)		1,551	16–19	2–14
April 25 (DH 1)	No. 15 Florida		Plainsman Park	**W** 10–8 (7)	**Gonzalez** (1–3)	Leftwich (6–3)	**Morrison** (1)		1,137	17–19	3–14
April 25 (DH 2)	No. 15 Florida		Plainsman Park	**L** 4–6 (7)	Barco (6–2)	**Barnett** (2–3)	Van Der Weide (2)		1,535	17–20	3–15
April 29	at No. 23 Georgia		Foley Field; Athens, GA	**L** 0–4	Webb (3–3)	**Owen** (1–3)	Harris (2)			17–21	3–16
April 30	at No. 23 Georgia		Foley Field	**W** 10–6 (14)	**Morrison** (1–0)	Pasqua (2–3)	None			18–21	4–16

May (7–5)
Date	Opponent	Rank	Site/stadium	Score	Win	Loss	Save	TV	Attendance	Overall record	SEC record
May 1	at No. 23 Georgia		Foley Field	**W** 9–7	**Bright** (4–4)	Wagner (3–3)	**Swilling** (2)			19–21	5–16
May 4	UAB*		Plainsman Park	Postponed							
May 6	LSU		Plainsman Park	**L** 8–3	Marceaux (5–4)	**Owen** (1–4)	Edwards (4)		1,511	19–22	5–17
May 7	LSU		Plainsman Park	**L** 6–9	Fontenot (2–2)	**Glavine** (1–2)	None		1,305	19–23	5–18
May 8	LSU		Plainsman Park	**W** 2–1	**Skipper** (1–2)	Hasty (0–1)	None		1,775	20–23	6–18
May 12	at Samford*		Hoover Metropolitan Stadium; Hoover, AL	**L** 1–6	Cravey (1–2)	**Sokol** (1–1)	None		1,787	20–24	6–18
May 14	Texas A&M		Plainsman Park	**W** 5–4	**Skipper** (2–2)	Saenz (5–6)	None		1,557	21–24	7–18
May 15	Texas A&M		Plainsman Park	**L** 9–11	Menefee (4–2)	**Swilling** (1–2)	None		1,673	21–25	7–19
May 16	Texas A&M		Plainsman Park	**W** 8–5	**Gonzalez** (2–3)	Ornelas (3–2)	**Skipper** (1)		1,530	22–25	8–19
May 18	North Alabama*		Plainsman Park	**W** 14–6	**Burkhalter** (1–0)	Best (1–11)	None		1,233	23–25	8–19
May 20	at Missouri		Taylor Stadium; Columbia, MO	**W** 15–6	**Owen** (2–4)	Kush (2–3)	None		871	24–25	9–19
May 21	at Missouri		Taylor Stadium	**W** 3–0	**Fitts** (1–3)	Halvorsen (4–3)	**Skipper** (2)		881	25–25	10–19
May 22	at Missouri		Taylor Stadium	**L** 6–7	Lancaster (1–0)	**Barnett** (2–4)	Miles (1)		903	25–26	10–20

Postseason (0–1)

SEC Tournament (0–1)
Date	Opponent	Seed	Site/stadium	Score	Win	Loss	Save	TV	Attendance	Overall record	SECT Record
May 25	(5); No. 12 Ole Miss	(12)	Hoover Metropolitan Stadium; Hoover, AL	**L** 4–7	Nikhazy (9–2)	**Owen** (2–5)	Broadway (13)		7,750	25–27	0–1

- Win
- Loss
- Postponement or cancellation
- Bold: Auburn player
- Rankings from D1Baseball.com.
- (#) Tournament seedings in parentheses.

== Record vs. conference opponents ==
Last two do not qualify for conf. tourn. Blank are not scheduled. Blue are home games, otherwise away.

2021 SEC baseball records Source: 2021 SEC baseball game results, 2021 SEC baseball schedule
Team	W–L	ALA	ARK	AUB	FLA	UGA	KEN	LSU	MSU	MIZZ	MISS	SCAR	TENN	TAMU	VAN	Team	Div	SR	SW
ALA	12–17		1–2	2–1	.	.	1–2	1–2	0–3	3–0	0–3	.	1–2	3–0	0–2	ALA	W5	3–7	2–2
ARK	22–8	2–1		2–1	3–0	2–1	.	2–1	3–0	.	2–1	2–1	2–1	2–1	.	ARK	W1	10–0	2–0
AUB	10–20	1–2	1–2		1–2	2–1	0–3	1–2	0–3	2–1	0–3	.	.	2–1	.	AUB	W6	3–7	0–3
FLA	17–13	.	0–3	2–1		2–1	2–1	.	.	3–0	2–1	0–3	1–2	3–0	2–1	FLA	E3	7–3	2–2
UGA	13–17	.	1–2	1–2	1–2		2–1	.	.	2–1	1–2	1–2	1–2	1–2	2–1	UGA	E5	3–7	0–0
KEN	12–18	2–1	.	3–0	1–2	1–2		1–2	0–3	2–1	.	0–3	1–2	.	1–2	KEN	E6	3–7	1–2
LSU	13–17	2–1	1–2	2–1	.	.	2–1		1–2	.	2–1	1–2	0–3	2–1	0–3	LSU	W4	5–5	0–2
MSU	20–10	3–0	0–3	3–0	.	.	3–0	2–1		1–2	2–1	2–1	.	3–0	1–2	MSU	W2	7–3	4–1
MIZZ	8–22	0–3	.	1–2	0–3	1–2	1–2	.	2–1		.	1–2	0–3	2–1	0–3	MIZZ	E7	2–8	0–4
MISS	18–12	3–0	1–2	3–0	1–2	2–1	.	1–2	1–2	.		3–0	.	1–2	2–1	MISS	W3	5–5	3–0
SCAR	16–14	.	1–2	.	3–0	2–1	3–0	2–1	1–2	2–1	0–3		1–2	.	1–2	SCAR	E4	5–5	2–1
TENN	20–10	2–1	1–2	.	2–1	2–1	2–1	3–0	.	3–0	.	2–1		2–1	1–2	TENN	E1	8–2	2–0
TAMU	9–21	0–3	1–2	1–2	0–3	2–1	.	1–2	0–3	1–2	2–1	.	1–2		.	TAMU	W7	2–8	0–3
VAN	19–10	2–0	.	.	1–2	1–2	2–1	3–0	2–1	3–0	1–2	2–1	2–1	.		VAN	E2	7–3	2–0
Team	W–L	ALA	ARK	AUB	FLA	UGA	KEN	LSU	MSU	MIZZ	MISS	SCAR	TENN	TAMU	VAN	Team	Div	SR	SW

Updated for entire regular season.

== Rankings ==
Ranking movements Legend: ██ Increase in ranking ██ Decrease in ranking — = Not ranked
	Week															
Poll	Pre	1	2	3	4	5	6	7	8	9	10	11	12	13	14	Final
Coaches'	—	—*	25	—	—	—	—	—	—	—	—	—	—	—	—	—
Baseball America	—	—	—	—	—	—	—	—	—	—	—	—	—	—	—	—
Collegiate Baseball^	—	26	26	—	—	—	—	—	—	—	—	—	—	—	—	—
NCBWA†	25	22	27	—	—	—	—	—	—	—	—	—	—	—	—	—
D1Baseball	23	21	—	—	—	—	—	—	—	—	—	—	—	—	—	—

^ Collegiate Baseball ranked 40 teams in their preseason poll, but only ranked 30 teams weekly during the season.
† NCBWA ranks 30 teams in their preseason poll, but only ranks 25 teams weekly during the season.
* A new poll was not released for this week, so for comparison purposes, the previous week's ranking is inserted in this week's slot.
