= 2021 Florida Gators baseball team =

Baseball team season

2021 Florida Gators baseball

Gainesville Regional, 0–2
- Conference: Southeastern Conference
- Eastern Division

Ranking
- Coaches: No. 25
- Record: 38–22 (17–13 SEC)
- Head coach: Kevin O'Sullivan (14th season)
- Assistant coaches: Craig Bell; Chuck Jeroloman
- Home stadium: Florida Ballpark

2021 Southeastern Conference baseball standings
	Conf.				Overall
Team	W		L	PCT	W		L	PCT
Eastern
No. 6 Tennessee ^{x}‍‍‍^{y}	20	–	10	.667	50	–	18	.735
No. 2 Vanderbilt ‍‍‍^{y}	19	–	10	.655	49	–	18	.731
Florida ‍‍‍^{y}	17	–	13	.567	38	–	22	.633
South Carolina ‍‍‍^{y}	16	–	14	.533	34	–	23	.596
Georgia ‍‍‍	13	–	17	.433	31	–	25	.554
Kentucky ‍‍‍	12	–	18	.400	29	–	23	.558
Missouri ‍‍‍	8	–	22	.267	15	–	36	.294
Western
No. 5 Arkansas ^{x}‍†‍‡‍^{y}	22	–	8	.733	50	–	13	.794
No. 1 Mississippi State ‍‍‍^{y}	20	–	10	.667	50	–	18	.735
No. 13 Ole Miss ‍‍‍^{y}	18	–	12	.600	45	–	22	.672
No. 18 LSU ‍‍‍^{y}	13	–	17	.433	38	–	25	.603
Alabama ‍‍‍^{y}	12	–	17	.414	32	–	26	.552
Auburn ‍‍‍	10	–	20	.333	25	–	27	.481
Texas A&M ‍‍‍	9	–	21	.300	29	–	27	.518
x – Division champion † – Conference champion ‡ – Tournament champion y – Invited to the NCAA tournament As of June 30, 2021; Rankings from D1Baseball

The 2021 Florida Gators baseball team represented the University of Florida in the sport of baseball during the 2021 college baseball season. Florida competed in the Eastern Division of the Southeastern Conference (SEC). Home games were played at Florida Ballpark on the university's Gainesville, Florida campus, in the first season at the ballpark. The team was coached by Kevin O'Sullivan in his fourteenth season as Florida's head coach. The Gators entered the season looking to return to the College World Series after an early regional exit from the 2019 NCAA tournament (no tournament held in 2020 due to COVID-19).

Entering the season as the unanimous No. 1 ranked team, the Gators were swiftly eliminated from their own regional after losing 5–3 to South Florida and 19–1 to South Alabama.

== Previous season ==
The Gators finished the abridged 2020 season with a 16–1 record – highlighted by a 16–0 start – and did not play any conference games. They finished ranked No. 1 in all five major polls.

== Personnel ==
=== Coaching staff ===
2021 Florida Gators coaching staff
Name	Position	Seasons at Florida	Alma mater
Kevin O'Sullivan	Head coach	14	Virginia (1991)
Craig Bell	Assistant coach	13	North Florida (1989)
Chuck Jeroloman	Assistant coach	2	Auburn (2005)
Lars Davis	Volunteer Assistant Coach	7	Illinois (2007)

== Schedule ==
Legend
	Florida win
	Florida loss
	Postponement
**Bold**	Florida team member

2021 Florida Gators baseball game log
Regular season

February (6–2)
Date	Opponent	Rank	Stadium Site	Score	Win	Loss	Save	Attendance	Overall Record	SEC Record
February 19	No. 21 Miami (FL); Rivalry	No. 1	Florida Ballpark; Gainesville, FL	**W** 7–5	**T. Mace** (1–0)	D. Federman (0–1)	**F. Aleman** (1)	1,418	1–0	—
February 20	No. 21 Miami (FL); Rivalry	No. 1	Florida Ballpark	**L** 9–10^{13}	B. Wagner (1–0)	**J. Butler** (0–1)	None	1,583	1–1	—
February 21	No. 21 Miami (FL); Rivalry	No. 1	Florida Ballpark	**L** 6–8	A. Arguellas (1–0)	**H. Barco** (0–1)	None	1,668	1–2	–
February 23	at North Florida	No. 7	Harmon Stadium; Jacksonville, FL	**W** 9–6	**J. Butler** (1–1)	E. Jones (0–1)	**B. Specht** (1)	125	2–2	–
February 24	North Florida	No. 7	Florida Ballpark	**W** 8–3	**C. Centala** (1–0)	M. McKinley (1–1)	None	1,562	3–2	–
February 26	Samford	No. 7	Florida Ballpark	**W** 8–4	**T. Mace** (2–0)	S. Strickland (1–1)	None	1,743	4–2	–
February 27	Samford	No. 7	Florida Ballpark	**W** 18–2	**J. Leftwich** (1–0)	J. McCord (0–1)	None	1,770	5–2	–
February 28	Samford	No. 7	Florida Ballpark	**W** 10–9	**B. Sproat** (1–0)	C. Isbell (0–1)	None	1,673	6–2	–

March (10–6)
Date	Opponent	Rank	Stadium Site	Score	Win	Loss	Save	Attendance	Overall Record	SEC Record
March 3	No. 21 Florida Atlantic	No. 6	Florida Ballpark	**L** 2–3^{10}	M. Entenza (1–0)	**F. Aleman** (0–1)	None	1,626	6–3	–
March 5 (1)	Florida A&M	No. 6	Florida Ballpark	**W** 10–2	**T. Mace** (3–0)	K. Coleman (0–2)	None	1,510	7–3	–
March 5 (2)^{[a]}	Florida A&M	No. 6	Florida Ballpark	**W** 5–1	**J. Leftwich** (2–0)	K. Fox (0–1)	None	1,724	8–3	–
March 7	Florida A&M	No. 6	Florida Ballpark	**W** 8–0	**H. Barco** (1–1)	J. Hancock (0–3)	None	1,865	9–3	–
March 9	Georgia State	No. 5	Florida Ballpark	**W** 5–1	**G. Milchin** (1–0)	S. Clark (0–1)	None	1,657	10–3	–
March 10	Stetson	No. 5	Florida Ballpark	**W** 10–7	**B. Sproat** (2–0)	N. Chiseri (0–1)	None	1,680	11–3	–
March 12	Jacksonville	No. 5	Florida Ballpark	**L** 9–10	T. Santana (2–2)	**C. Scott** (0–1)	J. McCoy (1)	1,769	11–4	–
March 13	Jacksonville	No. 5	Florida Ballpark	**W** 9–0	**J. Leftwich** (3–0)	M. Cassala (1–2)	**B. Sproat** (1)	2,052	12–4	–
March 14	Jacksonville	No. 5	Florida Ballpark	**W** 5–2	**H. Barco** (2–1)	M. Adams (1–1)	**F. Aleman** (2)	1,844	13–4	–
March 16	at Florida State; Rivalry	No. 5	Dick Howser Stadium; Tallahassee, FL	**L** 2–10	C. Haney (2–0)	**G. Milchin** (1–1)	None	1,581	13–5	–
March 18	Texas A&M	No. 5	Florida Ballpark	**W** 13–4	**T. Mace** (4–0)	D. Saenz (3–2)	None	1,773	14–5	1–0
March 19	Texas A&M	No. 5	Florida Ballpark	**W** 3–1	**J. Leftwich** (4–0)	C. Jozwiak (1–2)	**C. Scott** (1)	1,993	15–5	2–0
March 20	Texas A&M	No. 5	Florida Ballpark	**W** 8–4	**H. Barco** (3–1)	J. Childress (2–2)	**F. Aleman** (3)	2,078	16–5	3–0
March 26	at No. 25 South Carolina	No. 5	Founders Park; Columbia, SC	**L** 8–9^{14}	J. Bosnic (2–1)	**B. Specht** (0–1)	None	1,938	16–6	3–1
March 27	at No. 25 South Carolina	No. 5	Founders Park	**L** 1–4	B. Jordan (2–2)	**J. Leftwich** (4–1)	B. Kerry (2)	1,938	16–7	3–2
March 28	at No. 25 South Carolina	No. 5	Founders Park	**L** 5–8	W. Sanders (4–1)	**H. Barco** (3–2)	None	1,938	16–8	3–3
March 30	vs. No. 18 Florida State; Rivalry	No. 15	121 Financial Park; Jacksonville, FL	Canceled (COVID-19 pandemic)						
March 30	Mercer	No. 15	Florida Ballpark	Canceled (inclement weather)						
^{^[a]}Rescheduled from March 6 due to the threat of rain.

April (12–5)
Date	Opponent	Rank	Stadium Site	Score	Win	Loss	Save	Attendance	Overall Record	SEC Record
April 1	No. 3 Ole Miss	No. 15	Florida Ballpark	**W** 4–1	**F. Aleman** (1–1)^{[b]}	G. Hoglund (3–1)	**T. Mace** (1)^{[b]}	2,335	17–8	4–3
April 2	No. 3 Ole Miss	No. 15	Florida Ballpark	**L** 2–8	D. McDaniel (4–0)	**J. Leftwich** (4–2)	T. Broadway (7)	2,009	17–9	4–4
April 3	No. 3 Ole Miss	No. 15	Florida Ballpark	**W** 6–5	**H. Barco** (4–2)	D. Diamond (3–3)	**R. Cabarcas** (1)	2,894	18–9	5–4
April 6	Stetson	No. 12	Florida Ballpark	**W** 7–6	**G. Milchin** (2–1)	J. Gonzalez (2–1)	**F. Aleman** (4)	2,061	19–9	–
April 7	Florida A&M	No. 12	Florida Ballpark	**W** 10–0^{7}	**C. Centala** (2–0)	K. Wilson (1–4)	None	2,042	20–9	–
April 9	at No. 6 Tennessee	No. 12	Lindsey Nelson Stadium; Knoxville, TN	**L** 4–6	C. Dallas (5–0)	**C. Scott** (0–2)	S. Hunley (4)	1,477	20–10	5–5
April 10	at No. 6 Tennessee	No. 12	Lindsey Nelson Stadium	**L** 4–5	M. McLaughlin (2–0)	**T. Van Der Weide** (0–1)	K. Connell (1)	1,430	20–11	5–6
April 11	at No. 6 Tennessee	No. 12	Lindsey Nelson Stadium	**W** 7–6	**C. Scott** (1–2)	S. Hunley (4–2)	None	1,537	21–11	6–6
April 13	No. 24 Florida State; Rivalry	No. 18	Florida Ballpark	**W** 3–2^{10}	**J. Leftwich** (5–2)	C. Kwiatkowski (1–2)	None	2,972	22–11	–
April 16	Missouri	No. 18	Florida Ballpark	**W** 8–5	**C. Scott** (2–2)	S. Halvorsen (3–2)	None	2,102	23–11	7–6
April 17 (1)	Missouri	No. 18	Florida Ballpark	**W** 8–6	**J. Leftwich** (6–2)	L. Veinbergs (1–1)	None	2,628	24–11	8–6
April 17 (2)^{[c]}	Missouri	No. 18	Florida Ballpark	**W** 6–4	**H. Barco** (5–2)	Z. Hise (0–5)	**T. Van Der Weide** (1)	2,236	25–11	9–6
April 20	at Jacksonville	No. 15	John Sessions Stadium; Jacksonville, FL	**W** 8–7	**T. Van Der Weide** (1–1)	J. Carver (1–2)	**J. Carrion** (1)	809	26–11	–
April 23	at Auburn	No. 15	Plainsman Park; Auburn, AL	**W** 4–2	**C. Scott** (3–2)	T. Bright (3–4)	**J. Leftwich** (1)	1,551	27–11	10–6
April 24	at Auburn	No. 15	Plainsman Park	Postponed (rain) Makeup: April 25 as a 7-inning doubleheader						
April 25 (1)	at Auburn	No. 15	Plainsman Park	**L** 8–10^{7}	J. Gonzalez (1–3)	**J. Leftwich** (6–3)	W. Morrison (1)	1,137	27–12	10–7
April 25 (2)	at Auburn	No. 15	Plainsman Park	**W** 6–4^{7}	**H. Barco** (6–2)	M. Barnett (2–3)	**T. Van Der Weide** (2)	1,535	28–12	11–7
April 30	No. 2 Vanderbilt	No. 14	Florida Ballpark	**L** 7–11	K. Rocker (10–1)	**F. Aleman** (1–2)	None	3,341	28–13	11–8
^{^[b]}The boxscore incorrectly lists Aleman as the winning pitcher and Mace as having earned a save. According to Rule 10, Section 25, a starting pitcher must pitch for at least five innings to receive credit as the winning pitcher, and per Section 26, a save may not be credited to a winning pitcher. Aleman, the starting pitcher, pitched for the first four innings, and Mace for the remaining five. Therefore, Mace should have been credited as the winning pitcher.^{^[c]}Rescheduled from April 18 due to the threat of rain.

May (7–6)
Date	Opponent	Rank	Stadium Site	Score	Win	Loss	Save	Attendance	Overall Record	SEC Record
May 1	No. 2 Vanderbilt	No. 14	Florida Ballpark	**W** 11–8	**T. Mace** (5–0)	J. Leiter (7–2)	None	3,390	29–13	12–8
May 2	No. 2 Vanderbilt	No. 14	Florida Ballpark	**W** 5–3	**H. Barco** (7–2)	C. McElvain (3–1)	**J. Leftwich** (2)	2,986	30–13	13–8
May 4	Stetson	No. 10	Florida Ballpark	**W** 9–6	**T. Van Der Weide** (2–1)	N. Long (0–1)	**C. Scott** (2)	2,222	31–13	–
May 6	at Kentucky	No. 10	Kentucky Proud Park; Lexington, KY	**L** 5–7	D. Harper (3–0)	**T. Van Der Weide** (2–2)	None	1,161	31–14	13–9
May 7	at Kentucky	No. 10	Kentucky Proud Park	**W** 8–5	**C. Scott** (3–3)	A. Strickland (1–1)	**J. Leftwich** (3)	1,598	32–14	14–9
May 8	at Kentucky	No. 10	Kentucky Proud Park	**W** 9–2	**H. Barco** (8–2)	Z. Lee (4–5)	**J. Leftwich** (4)	1,406	33–14	15–9
May 11	at Stetson	No. 9	Conrad Park; DeLand, FL	**L** 1–6	D. Garcia (3–1)	**B. Specht** (0–2)	None	425	33–15	–
May 14	Georgia	No. 9	Florida Ballpark	**W** 4–3	**J. Leftwich** (7–3)	B. Harris (4–1)	None	3,009	34–15	16–9
May 15	Georgia	No. 9	Florida Ballpark	**W** 9–2	**H. Barco** (9–2)	J. Woods (3–1)	None	3,471	35–15	17–9
May 16	Georgia	No. 9	Florida Ballpark	**L** 1–6	J. Cannon (3–2)	**F. Aleman** (1–3)	None	2,715	35–16	17–10
May 20	at No. 1 Arkansas	No. 9	Baum–Walker Stadium; Fayetteville, AR	**L** 1–6	P. Wicklander (5–1)	**T. Mace** (5–1)	K. Kopps (8)	11,084	35–17	17–11
May 21	at No. 1 Arkansas	No. 9	Baum–Walker Stadium	**L** 3–4	K. Kopps (10–0)	**J. Leftwich** (7–4)	None	11,084	35–18	17–12
May 22	at No. 1 Arkansas	No. 9	Baum–Walker Stadium	**L** 3–9	Z. Vermillion (3–0)	**F. Aleman** (1–4)	None	11,084	35–19	17–13

Postseason

SEC Tournament (3–1)
Date	Opponent	Rank	Stadium Site	Score	Win	Loss	Save	Attendance	Overall Record	SECT Record
May 25	vs. (11) Kentucky; First Round	No. 13 (6)	Hoover Metropolitan Stadium; Hoover, AL	**W** 4–1	**T. Mace** (6–1)	S. Harney (3–2)	**J. Leftwich** (5)	3,499	36–19	1–0
May 26	vs. No. 8 (3) Mississippi State; Second Round	No. 13 (6)	Hoover Metropolitan Stadium	**W** 13–1^{7}	**H. Barco** (10–2)	B. Smith (4–3)	None	5,235	37–19	2–0
May 27	vs. (10) Alabama; Third Round	No. 13 (6)	Hoover Metropolitan Stadium	**W** 7–2	**F. Aleman** (2–4)	D. Smith (1–8)	None	8,625	38–19	3–0
May 29	vs. No. 4 (2) Tennessee; Semifinals	No. 13 (6)	Hoover Metropolitan Stadium	**L** 0–4	C. Sewell (4–1)	**B. Sproat** (2–1)	None	8,735	38–20	3–1

NCAA tournament: Gainesville Regional (0–2)
Date	Opponent	Rank	Stadium Site	Score	Win	Loss	Save	Attendance	Overall Record	Regional Record
June 4	(4) South Florida; First round	No. 14 (1)	Florida Ballpark	**L** 3–5	D. Burns (5–5)	**T. Mace** (6–2)	O. Kerkering (5)	3,581	38–21	0–1
June 5	(3) South Alabama; First round elimination game	No. 14 (1)	Florida Ballpark	**L** 1–19	M. Smith (7–1)	**H. Barco** (10–3)	None	3,673	38–22	0–2

Schedule source:

*Rankings are based on the team's current ranking in the D1Baseball poll. Parentheses indicate tournament seedings.

== Record vs. conference opponents ==
Last two do not qualify for conf. tourn. Blank are not scheduled. Blue are home games, otherwise away.

2021 SEC baseball records Source: 2021 SEC baseball game results, 2021 SEC baseball schedule
Team	W–L	ALA	ARK	AUB	FLA	UGA	KEN	LSU	MSU	MIZZ	MISS	SCAR	TENN	TAMU	VAN	Team	Div	SR	SW
ALA	12–17		1–2	2–1	.	.	1–2	1–2	0–3	3–0	0–3	.	1–2	3–0	0–2	ALA	W5	3–7	2–2
ARK	22–8	2–1		2–1	3–0	2–1	.	2–1	3–0	.	2–1	2–1	2–1	2–1	.	ARK	W1	10–0	2–0
AUB	10–20	1–2	1–2		1–2	2–1	0–3	1–2	0–3	2–1	0–3	.	.	2–1	.	AUB	W6	3–7	0–3
FLA	17–13	.	0–3	2–1		2–1	2–1	.	.	3–0	2–1	0–3	1–2	3–0	2–1	FLA	E3	7–3	2–2
UGA	13–17	.	1–2	1–2	1–2		2–1	.	.	2–1	1–2	1–2	1–2	1–2	2–1	UGA	E5	3–7	0–0
KEN	12–18	2–1	.	3–0	1–2	1–2		1–2	0–3	2–1	.	0–3	1–2	.	1–2	KEN	E6	3–7	1–2
LSU	13–17	2–1	1–2	2–1	.	.	2–1		1–2	.	2–1	1–2	0–3	2–1	0–3	LSU	W4	5–5	0–2
MSU	20–10	3–0	0–3	3–0	.	.	3–0	2–1		1–2	2–1	2–1	.	3–0	1–2	MSU	W2	7–3	4–1
MIZZ	8–22	0–3	.	1–2	0–3	1–2	1–2	.	2–1		.	1–2	0–3	2–1	0–3	MIZZ	E7	2–8	0–4
MISS	18–12	3–0	1–2	3–0	1–2	2–1	.	1–2	1–2	.		3–0	.	1–2	2–1	MISS	W3	5–5	3–0
SCAR	16–14	.	1–2	.	3–0	2–1	3–0	2–1	1–2	2–1	0–3		1–2	.	1–2	SCAR	E4	5–5	2–1
TENN	20–10	2–1	1–2	.	2–1	2–1	2–1	3–0	.	3–0	.	2–1		2–1	1–2	TENN	E1	8–2	2–0
TAMU	9–21	0–3	1–2	1–2	0–3	2–1	.	1–2	0–3	1–2	2–1	.	1–2		.	TAMU	W7	2–8	0–3
VAN	19–10	2–0	.	.	1–2	1–2	2–1	3–0	2–1	3–0	1–2	2–1	2–1	.		VAN	E2	7–3	2–0
Team	W–L	ALA	ARK	AUB	FLA	UGA	KEN	LSU	MSU	MIZZ	MISS	SCAR	TENN	TAMU	VAN	Team	Div	SR	SW

Updated for entire regular season.

== Rankings ==
Ranking movements Legend: ██ Increase in ranking ██ Decrease in ranking — = Not ranked ( ) = First-place votes
	Week																		
Poll	Pre	1	2	3	4	5	6	7	8	9	10	11	12	13	14	15	16	17	Final
Coaches'	1 (24)	1 (24)*	5	5	5	5 (2)	13	11	15	14	12	9	7	8	13	13	13*	13*	25
Baseball America	1	7	7	6	6	5	14	10	19	18	16	10	9	8	12	12	12*	12*	19
Collegiate Baseball^	1	3	3	3	3	2	10	9	14	12	9	7	7	7	12	12	—	—	—
NCBWA†	1	7	4	4	6	6	13	11	16	10	8	8	8	12	13	13	25	25*	23
D1Baseball	1	7	6	5	5	5	15	12	18	15	14	10	9	9	13	14	14*	14*	—

^ Collegiate Baseball ranked 40 teams in their preseason poll, but only ranked 30 teams weekly during the season.
† NCBWA ranks 30 teams in their preseason poll, but only ranks 25 teams weekly during the season.
* A new poll was not released for this week, so for comparison purposes, the previous week's ranking is inserted in this week's slot.

== 2021 MLB draft ==
Player	Position	Round	Overall	MLB team
Jud Fabian	OF	2	40	Boston Red Sox
Tommy Mace	RHP	B	69	Cleveland Indians
Nathan Hickey	C	5	136	Boston Red Sox
Christian Scott	RHP	5	142	New York Mets
Jack Leftwich	RHP	7	216	Cleveland Indians
Franco Aleman	RHP	10	306	Cleveland Indians

Fabian did not sign with the Red Sox and returned to Florida.
