= 2021 LSU Tigers baseball team =

2021 season of Louisiana State University baseball team

2021 LSU Tigers baseball

NCAA Eugene Regional champion

Knoxville Super Regional
- Conference: Southeastern Conference
- Western Division
- Record: 38–25 (13–17 SEC)
- Head coach: Paul Mainieri (15th season)
- Assistant coaches: Alan Dunn; Nolan Cain; Eddie Smith
- Home stadium: Alex Box Stadium

2021 Southeastern Conference baseball standings
	Conf.				Overall
Team	W		L	PCT	W		L	PCT
Eastern
No. 6 Tennessee ^{x}‍‍‍^{y}	20	–	10	.667	50	–	18	.735
No. 2 Vanderbilt ‍‍‍^{y}	19	–	10	.655	49	–	18	.731
Florida ‍‍‍^{y}	17	–	13	.567	38	–	22	.633
South Carolina ‍‍‍^{y}	16	–	14	.533	34	–	23	.596
Georgia ‍‍‍	13	–	17	.433	31	–	25	.554
Kentucky ‍‍‍	12	–	18	.400	29	–	23	.558
Missouri ‍‍‍	8	–	22	.267	15	–	36	.294
Western
No. 5 Arkansas ^{x}‍†‍‡‍^{y}	22	–	8	.733	50	–	13	.794
No. 1 Mississippi State ‍‍‍^{y}	20	–	10	.667	50	–	18	.735
No. 13 Ole Miss ‍‍‍^{y}	18	–	12	.600	45	–	22	.672
No. 18 LSU ‍‍‍^{y}	13	–	17	.433	38	–	25	.603
Alabama ‍‍‍^{y}	12	–	17	.414	32	–	26	.552
Auburn ‍‍‍	10	–	20	.333	25	–	27	.481
Texas A&M ‍‍‍	9	–	21	.300	29	–	27	.518
x – Division champion † – Conference champion ‡ – Tournament champion y – Invited to the NCAA tournament As of June 30, 2021; Rankings from D1Baseball

The 2021 LSU Tigers baseball team represented Louisiana State University in the 2021 NCAA Division I baseball season. The Tigers played their home games at Alex Box Stadium.

== Previous season ==
The Tigers started the season 12–5, however the season was suspended and ultimately canceled due to the COVID-19 pandemic. The Tigers had not yet begun SEC play. As a result, two seniors–Matthew Beck and Aaron George–were given an extra year of eligibility. In the 2019 season, the Tigers won the Baton Rouge Regional in the 2019 NCAA Division I baseball tournament before losing the Baton Rouge Super Regional to Florida State.

== Preseason ==
=== SEC Coaches poll ===
The SEC coaches poll was released on February 11, 2021 with the Tigers predicted to finish fourth in the Western Division.

Media poll (West)
Predicted finish	Team	Votes (1st place)
1	Ole Miss	78 (7)
2	Mississippi State	73 (3)
3	Arkansas	72 (2)
4	LSU	63 (2)
5	Texas A&M	36
6	Auburn	32
7	Alabama	31

=== Preseason All-SEC teams ===
First Team

- Devin Fontenot – Pitcher

Second Team

- Cade Beloso – Outfielder

== Personnel ==
=== Roster ===
2021 LSU Tigers roster
Pitchers: 0 - Jaden Hill – Junior; 8 - Matthew Beck – Graduate Student; 9 - Ty Floyd – Freshman; 11 - Landon Marceaux – Junior; 26 - AJ Labas – Junior; 28 - Devin Fontenot – Senior; 29 - Theo Millas – Freshman; 30 - Trent Vietmeier – Senior; 32 - Aaron George – Graduate Student; 33 - Michael Fowler – Freshman; 37 - Brandon Kaminer – Senior; 38 - Zachary Murray – Freshman; 41 - Brooks Rice – Freshman; 43 - Garrett Edwards – Freshman; 44 - Blake Money – Freshman; 46 - Alex Brady – Sophomore; 47 - Jacob Hasty – Sophomore; 48 - Will Hellmers – Freshman; 49 - Javen Coleman – Freshman; 52 - Ma'Khail Hilliard – Senior	Catchers: 20 - Alex Milazzo – Sophomore; 25 - Hayden Travinski – Sophomore; 27 - Jake Wyeth – Junior; 45 - Braden Doughty – Senior; Infielders: 2 - Zach Arnold – Sophomore; 4 - Cade Doughty – Freshman; 13 - Jordan Thompson – Freshman; 16 - Collier Cranford – Sophomore; 18 - Trey Morgan – Freshman	Outfielders: 7 - Giovanni Digiacomo – Junior; 10 - Brody Drost – Freshman; 14 - Maurice Hampton Jr. – Sophomore; 22 - Mitchell Sanford – Sophomore; Utility: 3 - Dylan Crews (INF/OF) – Freshman; 5 - Drew Bianco (INF/OF) – Sophomore; 17 - Will Safford (INF/OF) – Freshman; 24 - Cade Beloso (OF/1B) – Junior

=== Coaching staff ===
2021 lsu tigers coaching staff
Name	Position
Paul Mainieri	Head coach
Alan Dunn	Associate head coach
Nolan Cain	Assistant Coach/recruiting coordinator
Eddie Smith	Hitting Coach
Nate Fury	Director of Baseball Operations
Travis Roy	Strength and conditioning coordinator
Jamie Tutko	Director of Video and Scouting
Hunter Kiel	Undergraduate assistant coach
Cory Couture	Sr. Associate Athletic Trainer

== Schedule and results ==
2021 LSU Tigers baseball game log
Regular season (34–21)

February (6–1)
Date	Opponent	Rank	Site/stadium	Score	Win	Loss	Save	TV	Attendance	Overall record	SEC record
February 20	Air Force	No. 12	Alex Box Stadium; Baton Rouge, LA	**W** 6–1	**Hill** (1–0)	Fairburn Jr. (0–1)	None	SECN+	2,667	1–0	
February 21	Air Force	No. 12	Alex Box Stadium	**L** 5–6	Martinez III (1–0)	**Floyd** (0–1)	Skenes (1)	SECN+	2,572	1–1	
February 22	Louisiana Tech	No. 11	Alex Box Stadium	**W** 16–7	**Coleman** (1–0)	Follis (0–1)	None	SECN+	2,059	2–1	
February 24	at Louisiana	No. 11	M. L. Tigue Moore Field at Russo Park; Lafayette, LA	**W** 11–2	**Hellmers** (1–0)	Cooke (0–2)	None	ESPN+	1,183	3–1	
February 26	Youngstown State	No. 11	Alex Box Stadium	**W** 6–2	**Hill** (2–0)	Clark (0–2)	**Fontenot** (1)	SECN+	2,251	4–1	
February 27	Youngstown State	No. 11	Alex Box Stadium	**W** 5–3	**Brady** (1–0)	Clift Jr. (0–1)	None	SECN+	2,578	5–1	
February 27	Nicholls	No. 11	Alex Box Stadium	**W** 14–0	**Marceaux** (1–0)	Theriot (0–1)	None	SECN+	3,003	6–1	

March (11–7)
Date	Opponent	Rank	Site/stadium	Score	Win	Loss	Save	TV	Attendance	Overall record	SEC record
March 3	Nicholls	No. 11	Alex Box Stadium	**W** 5–4	**Fontenot** (1–0)	Taylor (0–2)	None	SECN+	1,902	7–1	
March 3	Southern	No. 11	Alex Box Stadium	**W** 16–1	**Hellmers** (2–0)	Smith (0–1)	None	SECN+	1,873	8–1	
March 5	Oral Roberts	No. 11	Alex Box Stadium	**L** 7–22	Kowalski (1–0)	**Hill** (2–1)	None	SECN+	2,013	8–2	
March 6	Oral Roberts	No. 11	Alex Box Stadium	**W** 12–0	**Marceaux** (2–0)	Coffey (1–1)	None	SECN+	3,152	9–2	
March 7	Oral Roberts	No. 11	Alex Box Stadium	**L** 1–3	Scoggins (1–1)	**Hellmers** (2–1)	Pierce (1)	SECN+	2,954	9–3	
March 9	Texas Southern	No. 21	Alex Box Stadium	**W** 10–4	**Hilliard** (1–0)	Beck (0–1)	None	SECN+	1,810	10–3	
March 10	at New Orleans	No. 21	Maestri Field at Privateer Park; New Orleans, LA	**W** 5–0	**Hellmers** (3–1)	Lamkin (0–1)	None	SECN+	N/A	11–3	
March 12	UTSA	No. 21	Alex Box Stadium	**W** 3–1	**Hilliard** (2–0)	Mason (1–2)	**Edwards** (1)	SECN+	3,164	12–3	
March 13	UTSA	No. 21	Alex Box Stadium	**W** 10–9^{13}	**Money** (1–0)	Chomko (0–1)	None	SECN	3,861	13–3	
March 14	UTSA	No. 21	Alex Box Stadium	**W** 13–12^{11}	**Millas** (1–0)	Ward (0–2)	None	SECN+	3,186	14–3	
March 16	Southeastern	No. 19	Alex Box Stadium	**W** 10–7	**Hellmers** (4–1)	Batty (0–1)	**Edwards** (2)	SECN+	3,906	15–3	
March 19	No. 3 Mississippi State	No. 19	Alex Box Stadium	**L** 0–3	MacLeod (2–1)	**Hill** (2–2)	Smith (1)	SECN	5,013	15–4	0–1
March 20	No. 3 Mississippi State	No. 19	Alex Box Stadium	**L** 1–6	Bednar (1–0)	**Marceaux** (2–1)	Sims (2)	SECN+	5,031	15–5	0–2
March 21	No. 3 Mississippi State	No. 19	Alex Box Stadium	**W** 8–3	**Labas** (1–0)	Fristoe (2–1)	**Fontenot** (2)	SECN+	4,603	16–5	1–2
March 26	at No. 12 Tennessee	No. 22	Lindsey Nelson Stadium; Knoxville, TN	**L** 1–3	Dallas (4–0)	**Marceaux** (2–2)	Hunley (2)	SECN+	1,384	16–6	1–3
March 27	at No. 12 Tennessee	No. 22	Lindsey Nelson Stadium	**L** 8–9^{11}	Hunley (3–0)	**Fontenot** (1–1)	None	SECN+	1,067	16–7	1–4
March 28	at No. 12 Tennessee	No. 22	Lindsey Nelson Stadium	**L** 2–3^{8}	Hunley (4–0)	**Edwards** (0–1)	None	SECN+	1,238	16–8	1–5
March 30	South Alabama		Alex Box Stadium	**W** 11–1	**Hellmers** (5–1)	Lehrmann (1–2)	None	SECN+	3,431	17–8	

April (8–8)
Date	Opponent	Rank	Site/stadium	Score	Win	Loss	Save	TV	Attendance	Overall record	SEC record
April 1	No. 1 Vanderbilt		Alex Box Stadium	**L** 1–13	Rocker (7–0)	**Marceaux** (2–3)	Hliboki (2)	SECN+	4,619	17–9	1–6
April 2	No. 1 Vanderbilt		Alex Box Stadium	**L** 2–11	Leiter (7–0)	**Hill** (2–3)	Maldonado (2)	ESPNU	4,904	17–10	1–7
April 3	No. 1 Vanderbilt		Alex Box Stadium	**L** 4–5	Smith (1–0)	**Edwards** (0–2)	Murphy (5)	SECN+	4,314	17–11	1–8
April 6	McNeese State		Alex Box Stadium	**W** 14–1	**Edwards** (1–2)	Vega (0–3)	None	SECN+	3,606	18–11	
April 9	at Kentucky		Kentucky Proud Park; Lexington, KY	**W** 15–2	**Marceaux** (3–3)	Stupp (3–2)	None	SECN+	1,781	19–11	2–8
April 10	at Kentucky		Kentucky Proud Park	**W** 8–6	**Labas** (2–0)	Hagenow (1–2)	**Edwards** (3)	SECN	1,041	20–11	3–8
April 11	at Kentucky		Kentucky Proud Park	**L** 4–13	Lee (3–2)	**Money** (1–1)	None	SECN+	1,216	20–12	3–9
April 15	No. 11 South Carolina		Alex Box Stadium	**W** 5–1	**Marceaux** (4–3)	Farr (2–3)	None	ESPNU	3,747	21–12	4–9
April 16	No. 11 South Carolina		Alex Box Stadium	**L** 2–4^{7}	Peters (3–1)	**Fontenot** (1–2)	Kerry (3)	SECN+	4,282	21–13	4–10
April 17	No. 11 South Carolina		Alex Box Stadium	**L** 0–9^{7}	Sanders (6–1)	**Money** (1–2)	None	SECN+	4,438	21–14	4–11
April 20	Louisiana-Monroe		Alex Box Stadium	**W** 5–0	**Hellmers** (6–1)	Lien (3–2)	None	SECN+	3,503	22–14	
April 22	at No. 6 Ole Miss		Swayze Field; Oxford, MS	**W** 5–4	**Edwards** (2–2)	Broadway (3–1)	**Fontenot** (3)	ESPNU	9,035	23–14	5–11
April 23	at No. 6 Ole Miss		Swayze Field	**W** 7–2	**Labas** (3–0)	Nikhazy (4–2)	None	SECN+	11,788	24–14	6–11
April 24	at No. 6 Ole Miss		Swayze Field	**L** 9–10	Broadway (4–1)	**Floyd** (0–2)	None	SECN+	11,653	24–15	6–12
April 27	Grambling State		Alex Box Stadium	**W** 7–0	**Hilliard** (3–0)	Valerio (3–2)	None	SECN+	1,786	25–15	
April 30	No. 1 Arkansas		Alex Box Stadium	**L** 0–7	Wicklander (3–1)	**Marceaux** (4–4)	Kopps (6)	SECN	6,331	25–16	6–13

May (9–5)
Date	Opponent	Rank	Site/stadium	Score	Win	Loss	Save	TV	Attendance	Overall record	SEC record
May 1	No. 1 Arkansas		Alex Box Stadium	**L** 10–17	Costeiu (6–1))	Labas (3–1)	None	SECN+	5,308	25–17	6–14
May 2	No. 1 Arkansas		Alex Box Stadium	**W** 5–4	**Hilliard** (4–0)	Lockhart (1–2)	None	SECN+	7,036	26–17	7–14
May 4	Southern		Alex Box Stadium	**W** 10–2	**Coleman** (2–0)	Davis (0–4)	None	SECN+	2,088	27–17	
May 6	at Auburn		Plainsman Park; Auburn, AL	**W** 8–3	**Marceaux** (5–4)	Owen (1–4)	**Edwards** (4)	ESPNU	1,511	28–17	8–14
May 7	at Auburn		Plainsman Park	**W** 9–6	**Fontenot** (2–2)	Glavine (1–2)	None	SECN	1,305	29–17	9–14
May 8	at Auburn		Plainsman Park	**L** 1–2	Skipper (1–2)	**Hasty** (0–1)	None	SECN+	1,775	29–18	9–15
May 11	No. 14 Louisiana Tech		Alex Box Stadium	**W** 16–8^{7}	**Fowler** (1–0)	Tomkins (2–2)	None	SECN+	4,068	30–18	
May 14	Alabama		Alex Box Stadium	**W** 2–1	**Marceaux** (6–4)	Ras (6–3)	**Fontenot** (4)	SECN+	6,946	31–18	10–15
May 15	Alabama		Alex Box Stadium	**L** 5–6	Shamblin (4–2)	**Labas** (3–2)	Lee (7)	SECN	6,912	31–19	10–16
May 16	Alabama		Alex Box Stadium	**W** 13–5	**Hilliard** (5–0)	Prielipp (1–1)	None	SECN+	6,791	32–19	11–16
May 18	Northwestern State		Alex Box Stadium	**L** 3–7	Francis (1–0)	**Hellmers** (6–2)	Brown (6)	SECN+	3,274	32–20	
May 20	at Texas A&M		Olsen Field at Blue Bell Park; College Station, TX	**L** 1–2	Saenz (6–6)	**Coleman** (2–1)	Jozwiak (8)	ESPNU	1,586	32–21	11–17
May 21	at Texas A&M		Olsen Field at Blue Bell Park	**W** 12–6^{13}	**Fontenot** (3–2)	Jozwiak (2–4)	None	SECN+	2,123	33–21	12–17
May 22	at Texas A&M		Olsen Field at Blue Bell Park	**W** 8–2	**Hilliard** (6–0)	Weber (1–3)	None	SECN+	1,693	34–21	13–17

Postseason (4–4)

SEC Tournament (0–1)
Date	Opponent	Seed/rank	Site/stadium	Score	Win	Loss	Save	TV	Attendance	Overall record	SECT record
May 25	vs. (8) Georgia	(9)	Hoover Metropolitan Stadium; Hoover, AL	**L** 1–4	Woods (4–1)	**Marceaux** (6–5)	Gowen (1)	SECN	7,750	34–22	0–1

NCAA tournament – Eugene Regional (4–1)
Date	Opponent	Seed/rank	Site/stadium	Score	Win	Loss	Save	TV	Attendance	Overall record	NCAAT record
June 4	(2) No. 25 Gonzaga	(3)	PK Park; Eugene, OR	**L** 0–3	Jacob (8–1)	**Marceaux** (6–6)	None	ESPNU		34–23	0–1
June 5	(4) Central Connecticut State	(3)	PK Park	**W** 6–5^{10}	**Fontenot** (4–2)	Neuman (5–1)	None	SECN		35–23	1–1
June 6	(2) No. 25 Gonzaga	(3)	PK Park	**W** 9–4	**Labas** (4–2)	Gomez (5–4)	None	SECN		36–23	2–1
June 6	(1) No. 10 Oregon	(3)	PK Park	**W** 4–1	**Coleman** (3–1)	Walker (6–3)	**Fontenot** (5)	ESPN3		37–23	3–1
June 7	(1) No. 10 Oregon	(3)	PK Park	**W** 9–8	**Marceaux** (7–6)	Somers (2–2)	None	ESPN2	1,640	38–23	4–1

NCAA tournament – Knoxville Super Regional (0–2)
Date	Opponent	Seed/rank	Site/stadium	Score	Win	Loss	Save	TV	Attendance	Overall record	NCAAT record
June 12	No. 2 Tennessee		Lindsey Nelson Stadium; Knoxville, TN	**L** 2–4	Dallas (11–1)	**Coleman** (3–2)	Hunley (9)	ESPN2	4,283	38–24	4–3
June 13	No. 2 Tennessee		Lindsey Nelson Stadium	**L** 6–15	Tidwell (10–3)	**Marceaux** (7–7)	None	ESPN2/ESPNU	4,283	38–25	4–4

Legend: = Win = Loss = Cancelled/Suspended
Bold = LSU team member

Schedule source:

*Rankings are based on the team's current ranking in the D1Baseball poll.

== Conference matrix ==
Last two do not qualify for conf. tourn. Blank are not scheduled. Blue are home games, otherwise away.

2021 SEC baseball records Source: 2021 SEC baseball game results, 2021 SEC baseball schedule
Team	W–L	ALA	ARK	AUB	FLA	UGA	KEN	LSU	MSU	MIZZ	MISS	SCAR	TENN	TAMU	VAN	Team	Div	SR	SW
ALA	12–17		1–2	2–1	.	.	1–2	1–2	0–3	3–0	0–3	.	1–2	3–0	0–2	ALA	W5	3–7	2–2
ARK	22–8	2–1		2–1	3–0	2–1	.	2–1	3–0	.	2–1	2–1	2–1	2–1	.	ARK	W1	10–0	2–0
AUB	10–20	1–2	1–2		1–2	2–1	0–3	1–2	0–3	2–1	0–3	.	.	2–1	.	AUB	W6	3–7	0–3
FLA	17–13	.	0–3	2–1		2–1	2–1	.	.	3–0	2–1	0–3	1–2	3–0	2–1	FLA	E3	7–3	2–2
UGA	13–17	.	1–2	1–2	1–2		2–1	.	.	2–1	1–2	1–2	1–2	1–2	2–1	UGA	E5	3–7	0–0
KEN	12–18	2–1	.	3–0	1–2	1–2		1–2	0–3	2–1	.	0–3	1–2	.	1–2	KEN	E6	3–7	1–2
LSU	13–17	2–1	1–2	2–1	.	.	2–1		1–2	.	2–1	1–2	0–3	2–1	0–3	LSU	W4	5–5	0–2
MSU	20–10	3–0	0–3	3–0	.	.	3–0	2–1		1–2	2–1	2–1	.	3–0	1–2	MSU	W2	7–3	4–1
MIZZ	8–22	0–3	.	1–2	0–3	1–2	1–2	.	2–1		.	1–2	0–3	2–1	0–3	MIZZ	E7	2–8	0–4
MISS	18–12	3–0	1–2	3–0	1–2	2–1	.	1–2	1–2	.		3–0	.	1–2	2–1	MISS	W3	5–5	3–0
SCAR	16–14	.	1–2	.	3–0	2–1	3–0	2–1	1–2	2–1	0–3		1–2	.	1–2	SCAR	E4	5–5	2–1
TENN	20–10	2–1	1–2	.	2–1	2–1	2–1	3–0	.	3–0	.	2–1		2–1	1–2	TENN	E1	8–2	2–0
TAMU	9–21	0–3	1–2	1–2	0–3	2–1	.	1–2	0–3	1–2	2–1	.	1–2		.	TAMU	W7	2–8	0–3
VAN	19–10	2–0	.	.	1–2	1–2	2–1	3–0	2–1	3–0	1–2	2–1	2–1	.		VAN	E2	7–3	2–0
Team	W–L	ALA	ARK	AUB	FLA	UGA	KEN	LSU	MSU	MIZZ	MISS	SCAR	TENN	TAMU	VAN	Team	Div	SR	SW

Updated for entire regular season.

== Rankings ==
Ranking movements Legend: ██ Increase in ranking ██ Decrease in ranking — = Not ranked
	Week																
Poll	Pre	1	2	3	4	5	6	7	8	9	10	11	12	13	14	15	Final
Coaches'	9	9*	9	8	20	15	16	—	—	—	—	—	—	—	—	—	18
Baseball America	10	10	13	12	—	—	—	—	—	—	—	—	—	—	—	—	21
Collegiate Baseball^	7	7	11	8	15	10	14	—	—	—	—	—	—	—	14	15	15
NCBWA†	13	13	10	10	18	13	16	—	—	—	—	—	—	—	—	15	12
D1Baseball	12	12	11	11	21	19	22	—	—	—	—	—	—	—	—	—	18

^ Collegiate Baseball ranked 40 teams in their preseason poll, but only ranked 30 teams weekly during the season.
† NCBWA ranks 30 teams in their preseason poll, but only ranks 25 teams weekly during the season.
* A new poll was not released for this week, so for comparison purposes, the previous week's ranking is inserted in this week's slot.

== 2021 MLB draft ==
Player	Position	Round	Overall	MLB team
Jaden Hill	RHP	2	44	Colorado Rockies
Landon Marceaux	RHP	3	80	Los Angeles Angels
