= 2021 Kentucky Wildcats baseball team =

2021 season of University of Kentucky baseball team

2021 Kentucky Wildcats baseball
- Conference: Southeastern Conference
- Eastern Division
- Record: 29–23 (12–18 SEC)
- Head coach: Nick Mingione (5th season)
- Assistant coaches: Will Coggin; Dan Roszel
- Home stadium: Kentucky Proud Park

2021 Southeastern Conference baseball standings
	Conf.				Overall
Team	W		L	PCT	W		L	PCT
Eastern
No. 6 Tennessee ^{x}‍‍‍^{y}	20	–	10	.667	50	–	18	.735
No. 2 Vanderbilt ‍‍‍^{y}	19	–	10	.655	49	–	18	.731
Florida ‍‍‍^{y}	17	–	13	.567	38	–	22	.633
South Carolina ‍‍‍^{y}	16	–	14	.533	34	–	23	.596
Georgia ‍‍‍	13	–	17	.433	31	–	25	.554
Kentucky ‍‍‍	12	–	18	.400	29	–	23	.558
Missouri ‍‍‍	8	–	22	.267	15	–	36	.294
Western
No. 5 Arkansas ^{x}‍†‍‡‍^{y}	22	–	8	.733	50	–	13	.794
No. 1 Mississippi State ‍‍‍^{y}	20	–	10	.667	50	–	18	.735
No. 13 Ole Miss ‍‍‍^{y}	18	–	12	.600	45	–	22	.672
No. 18 LSU ‍‍‍^{y}	13	–	17	.433	38	–	25	.603
Alabama ‍‍‍^{y}	12	–	17	.414	32	–	26	.552
Auburn ‍‍‍	10	–	20	.333	25	–	27	.481
Texas A&M ‍‍‍	9	–	21	.300	29	–	27	.518
x – Division champion † – Conference champion ‡ – Tournament champion y – Invited to the NCAA tournament As of June 30, 2021; Rankings from D1Baseball

The 2021 Kentucky Wildcats baseball team represented the University of Kentucky in the 2021 NCAA Division I baseball season. Kentucky was competing in the Eastern Division of the Southeastern Conference (SEC). The Wildcats played their home games at Kentucky Proud Park.

== Previous season ==
The Wildcats finished 11–6 overall, and 0–0 in the conference. The season was prematurely cut short due to the COVID-19 pandemic.

== Personnel ==
=== Roster ===
2021 Kentucky Wildcats roster
Pitchers: 11 – Trip Lockhart – Senior; 16 – Cole Stupp – Sophomore; 20 – Braxton Cottongame – Junior; 21 – Wyatt Hudepohl – Freshman; 22 – Dillon Marsh – Junior; 24 – Ryan Hagenow – Freshman; 31 – Alex Degen – Junior; 34 – Sean Harney – Senior; 35 – Cole Daniels – Junior; 36 – Ron Cole – Sophomore; 38 – Jimmy Ramsey – Senior; 39 – Hunter Rigsby – Junior; 40 – Zach Kammin – Graduate Student; 41 – Evan Byers – Freshman; 45 – Holt Jones – Senior; 46 – Seth Logue – Freshman; 48 – Zack Lee – Sophomore; 49 – Austin Strickland – Freshman; 50 – Mason Hazelwood – Senior; 54 – Daniel Harper – Senior; 55 – Tyler Burchett – (redshirt) Sophomore	Catchers: 9 – Alonzo Rubalcaba – Junior; 13 – Brendan Hord – Sophomore; 25 – Coltyn Kessler – Senior; 44 – Devin Burkes – Freshman; Infielders: 4 – Zeke Lewis – Graduate Student; 5 – T.J. Collett – Graduate Student; 6 – Reuben Church – Freshman; 7 – Drew Grace – Sophomore; 10 – Jack Hicks – Freshman; 12 – Chase Estep – Sophomore; 26 – Jacob Plastiak – Junior; 33 – Trae Harmon – Junior; 47 – Ryan Ritter – Sophomore	Outfielders: 1 – John Rhodes – Sophomore; 23 – Houston King – Freshman; 28 – Oraj Anu – Senior; 30 – Jaren Shelby – Graduate Student; 37 – Cam Hill – (redshirt) Junior; 51 – Chase Bryan – (redshirt) Junior; Utility: 2 – Austin Schultz (INF/OF) – Junior; 8 – Kirk Liebert (OF/C) – Junior; 19 – Nolan McCarthy (INF/P) – Freshman

=== Coaching staff ===
2020 Kentucky Wildcats coaching staff
Name	Position
Nick Mingione	Head coach
Dan Roszel	Assistant coach/Pitching
Will Coggin	Assistant coach/Recruiting Coordinator
Todd Guilliams	Volunteer Assistant Coach

== Schedule and results ==
Legend
	Kentucky win
	Kentucky loss
	Postponement
**Bold**	Kentucky team member

2021 Kentucky Wildcats baseball game log
Regular season (18–4)

February (4–0)
Date	Opponent	Rank	Site/stadium	Score	Win	Loss	Save	TV	Attendance	Overall record	SEC record
Feb. 23	Miami (OH)		Kentucky Proud Park; Lexington, Kentucky	5–1	**Hagenow** (1–0)	Blackmore (0–1)	none	SECN+	490	1–0	–
Feb. 26	Milwaukee		Kentucky Proud Park	10–0	**Stupp** (1–0)	Mahoney (0–1)	none	SECN+	716	2–0	–
Feb. 27	Milwaukee		Kentucky Proud Park	9–3	**Lee** (1–0)	Edwards (0–1)	**Harney** (1)	SECN+	1,010	3–0	–
Feb. 27	Milwaukee		Kentucky Proud Park	4–2	**Hazelwood** (1–0)	Frey (0–1)	none	SECN+	1,010	4–0	–

March (14–4)
Date	Opponent	Rank	Site/stadium	Score	Win	Loss	Save	TV	Attendance	Overall record	SEC record
Mar. 2	Eastern Kentucky		Kentucky Proud Park	6–3	**Logue** (1–0)	Simpson (0–1)	**Harney** (2)	SECN+	556	5–0	–
Mar. 4	Evansville		Kentucky Proud Park	8–5	**Ramsey** (1–0)	Parks (0–1)	**Harney** (3)	SECN+	517	6–0	–
Mar. 5	Ball State		Kentucky Proud Park	2–3	Jaksich (1–0)	**Daniels** (0–1)	Baker (1)	SECN+	886	6–1	–
Mar. 6	Ball State		Kentucky Proud Park	6–0	**Hazelwood** (2–0)	Ruetschle (1–1)	**Logue** (1)	SECN+	888	7–1	–
Mar. 7	Ball State		Kentucky Proud Park	3–4	Jaksich (2–0)	**Lee** (1–1)	Baker (1)	SECN+	996	7–2	–
Mar. 9	Western Kentucky		Kentucky Proud Park	6–5	**Harper** (1–0)	Shiflet (0–1)	**Harney** (4)	SECN+	881	8–2	–
Mar. 12	Georgia State		Kentucky Proud Park	16–1	**Stupp** (2–0)	Watson (1–2)	none	SECN+	905	9–2	–
Mar. 13	Georgia State		Kentucky Proud Park	6–1	**Hazelwood** (3–0)	Jones (0–1)	none	SECN+	1,017	10–2	–
Mar. 14	Georgia State		Kentucky Proud Park	4–2	**Jones** (1–0)	Treadway (0–3)	**Harney** (5)	SECN+	824	11–2	–
Mar. 16	Murray State		Kentucky Proud Park	8–13	Jones (2–0)	**Daniels** (0–2)	none	SECN+	659	11–3	
Mar. 19	Missouri		Kentucky Proud Park	10–2	**Stupp** (1–3)	Miles (3–0)	none	SECN+	1,050	12–3	1–0
Mar. 20	Missouri		Kentucky Proud Park	5–4	**Harney** (1–0)	Lohse (1–2)	none	SECN+	1,122	13–3	2–0
Mar. 21	Missouri		Kentucky Proud Park	3–5	Ash (1–0)	**Marsh** (0–1)	Veinbergs (1)	SECN+	1,140	13–4	2–1
Mar. 23	Butler		Kentucky Proud Park	6–5	**Daniels** (1–2)	Pilcher (0–1)	none	SECN+	842	14–4	
Mar. 26	at Auburn		Plainsman Park	8–6^{10}	**Harper** (2–0)	Fitts (0–3)	none	SECN+	850	15–4	3–1
Mar. 27	at Auburn		Plainsman Park	7–6	**Strickland** (1–0)	Owen (0–1)	none	SECN+	850	16–4	4–1
Mar. 27	at Auburn		Plainsman Park	6–4	**Lee** (2–1)	Gonzalez (0–2)	**Jones (1)**	SECN	850	17–4	5–1
Mar. 30	Bellarmine		Kentucky Proud Park	4–3	**Degen** (1–0)	Ethington (2–1)	**Logue** (1)	SECN+	1,453	18–4	

April (8–11)
Date	Opponent	Rank	Site/stadium	Score	Win	Loss	Save	TV	Attendance	Overall record	SEC record
Apr. 1	at Mississippi State	21	Dudy Noble Field	1–8	MacLeod (3–2)	**Hagenow** (1–1)	none	ESPNU	3,448	18–5	5–2
Apr. 2	at Mississippi State	21	Dudy Noble Field	2–3	Sims (2–0)	**Stupp** (3–1)	none	SECN	3,912	18–6	5–3
Apr. 3	at Mississippi State	21	Dudy Noble Field	3–4	Fristoe (3–2)	**Lee** (2–2)	Stinnett (1)	SECN+	4,159	18–7	5–4
Apr. 6	at Louisville		Jim Patterson Stadium	11–7	**Harney** (2–0)	Perkins (1–1)	**Rigsby** (1)	ACCN	880	19–7	
Apr. 9	LSU		Kentucky Proud Park	2–15	Marceaux (3–3)	**Stupp** (3–2)	none	SECN+	1,781	19–8	5–5
Apr. 10	LSU		Kentucky Proud Park	6–8	Labas (2–0)	**Hagenow** (1–2)	Edwards (3)	SECN	1,041	19–9	5–6
Apr. 11	LSU		Kentucky Proud Park	13–4	**Lee** (3–2)	Money (1–1)	none	SECN+	1,216	20–9	6–6
Apr. 13	Bellarmine		Kentucky Proud Park	12–0	**Kammin** (1–0)	Nolan (0–3)	none	SECN+	702	21–9	
Apr. 16	at Georgia		Foley Field	6–1	**Stupp** (4–2)	Webb (2–2)	none	SECN+	664	22–9	7–6
Apr. 17	at Georgia		Foley Field	7–8	Harris (3–0)	**Daniels** (1–3)	Woods (1)	SECN	664	22–10	7–7
Apr. 18	at Georgia		Foley Field	6–17	Woods (2–0)	**Lee** (3–3)	none	SECN+	664	22–11	7–8
Apr. 20	Louisville		Kentucky Proud Park	5–12	Lohman (1–1)	**Kammin** (1–1)	none	SECN+	1,730	22–12	
Apr. 23	Alabama		Kentucky Proud Park	1–10	Ras (6–1)	**Stupp** (4–3)	none	SECN+	1,205	22–13	7–9
Apr. 25	Alabama		Kentucky Proud Park	5–2	**Harney** (3–0)	Smith (0–5)	**Rigsby** (2)	SECN+	1,953	23–13	8–9
Apr. 25	Alabama		Kentucky Proud Park	11–0	**Lee** (4–3)	Freeman (0–1)	none	SECN+	1,953	24–13	9–9
Apr. 27	Eastern Kentucky		Kentucky Proud Park	7–6	**Ramsey** (2–0)	Bryce (2–2)	none	SECN+	1,289	25–13	
Apr. 29	at Tennessee		Lindsey Nelson Stadium	4–14	Dallas (7–1)	**Stupp** (4–4)	none	ESPNU	1,511	25–14	9–10
Apr. 30	at Tennessee		Lindsey Nelson Stadium	8–2	**Degen** (2–0)	Heflin (2–2)	none	SECN+	2,400	26–14	10–10

May (3–8)
Date	Opponent	Rank	Site/stadium	Score	Win	Loss	Save	TV	Attendance	Overall record	SEC record
May 1	at Tennessee		Lindsey Nelson Stadium	2–11	Tidwell (5–2)	**Lee** (4–4)	Walsh (5)	SECN+	2,101	26–15	10–11
May 6	Florida		Kentucky Proud Park	7–5	Harper			SECN		27–15	11–11
May 7	Florida		Kentucky Proud Park	5–8				SECN+		27–16	11–12
May 8	Florida		Kentucky Proud Park	2–9				SECN+		27–17	11–13
May 11	Morehead State	**Cancelled**	Kentucky Proud Park					SECN			
May 14	South Carolina		Kentucky Proud Park	6–12				SECN+		27–18	11–14
May 15	South Carolina		Kentucky Proud Park	0–9				SECN+		27–19	11–15
May 16	South Carolina		Kentucky Proud Park	6–11				SECN+		27–20	11–16
May 18	Tennessee Tech		Kentucky Proud Park	8–4				SECN+		28–20	
May 20	Vanderbilt		Hawkins Field	2–4				SECN+		28–21	11–17
May 21	Vanderbilt		Hawkins Field	2–8				SECN+		28–22	11–18
May 22	Vanderbilt		Hawkins Field	7–5				SECN+		29–22	12–18

Postseason (0–1)

SEC Tournament
Date	Opponent	Seed	Site/stadium	Score	Win	Loss	Save	TV	Attendance	Overall record	SECT Record
May 25	Florida		Hoover Metropolitan Stadium; Hoover, AL	1–4				SECN		29–23	0–1

† Indicates the game does not count toward the 2019 Southeastern Conference standings.
*Rankings are based on the team's current ranking in the D1Baseball poll.

== Record vs. conference opponents ==
Last two do not qualify for conf. tourn. Blank are not scheduled. Blue are home games, otherwise away.

2021 SEC baseball records Source: 2021 SEC baseball game results, 2021 SEC baseball schedule
Team	W–L	ALA	ARK	AUB	FLA	UGA	KEN	LSU	MSU	MIZZ	MISS	SCAR	TENN	TAMU	VAN	Team	Div	SR	SW
ALA	12–17		1–2	2–1	.	.	1–2	1–2	0–3	3–0	0–3	.	1–2	3–0	0–2	ALA	W5	3–7	2–2
ARK	22–8	2–1		2–1	3–0	2–1	.	2–1	3–0	.	2–1	2–1	2–1	2–1	.	ARK	W1	10–0	2–0
AUB	10–20	1–2	1–2		1–2	2–1	0–3	1–2	0–3	2–1	0–3	.	.	2–1	.	AUB	W6	3–7	0–3
FLA	17–13	.	0–3	2–1		2–1	2–1	.	.	3–0	2–1	0–3	1–2	3–0	2–1	FLA	E3	7–3	2–2
UGA	13–17	.	1–2	1–2	1–2		2–1	.	.	2–1	1–2	1–2	1–2	1–2	2–1	UGA	E5	3–7	0–0
KEN	12–18	2–1	.	3–0	1–2	1–2		1–2	0–3	2–1	.	0–3	1–2	.	1–2	KEN	E6	3–7	1–2
LSU	13–17	2–1	1–2	2–1	.	.	2–1		1–2	.	2–1	1–2	0–3	2–1	0–3	LSU	W4	5–5	0–2
MSU	20–10	3–0	0–3	3–0	.	.	3–0	2–1		1–2	2–1	2–1	.	3–0	1–2	MSU	W2	7–3	4–1
MIZZ	8–22	0–3	.	1–2	0–3	1–2	1–2	.	2–1		.	1–2	0–3	2–1	0–3	MIZZ	E7	2–8	0–4
MISS	18–12	3–0	1–2	3–0	1–2	2–1	.	1–2	1–2	.		3–0	.	1–2	2–1	MISS	W3	5–5	3–0
SCAR	16–14	.	1–2	.	3–0	2–1	3–0	2–1	1–2	2–1	0–3		1–2	.	1–2	SCAR	E4	5–5	2–1
TENN	20–10	2–1	1–2	.	2–1	2–1	2–1	3–0	.	3–0	.	2–1		2–1	1–2	TENN	E1	8–2	2–0
TAMU	9–21	0–3	1–2	1–2	0–3	2–1	.	1–2	0–3	1–2	2–1	.	1–2		.	TAMU	W7	2–8	0–3
VAN	19–10	2–0	.	.	1–2	1–2	2–1	3–0	2–1	3–0	1–2	2–1	2–1	.		VAN	E2	7–3	2–0
Team	W–L	ALA	ARK	AUB	FLA	UGA	KEN	LSU	MSU	MIZZ	MISS	SCAR	TENN	TAMU	VAN	Team	Div	SR	SW

Updated for entire regular season.

== 2021 MLB draft ==
Player	Position	Round	Overall	MLB team
John Rhodes	OF	3	76	Baltimore Orioles
Austin Schultz	OF	10	285	Detroit Tigers
Holt Jones Jr.	RHP	14	419	Miami Marlins
