= Dom Keegan =

American baseball player (born 2000)

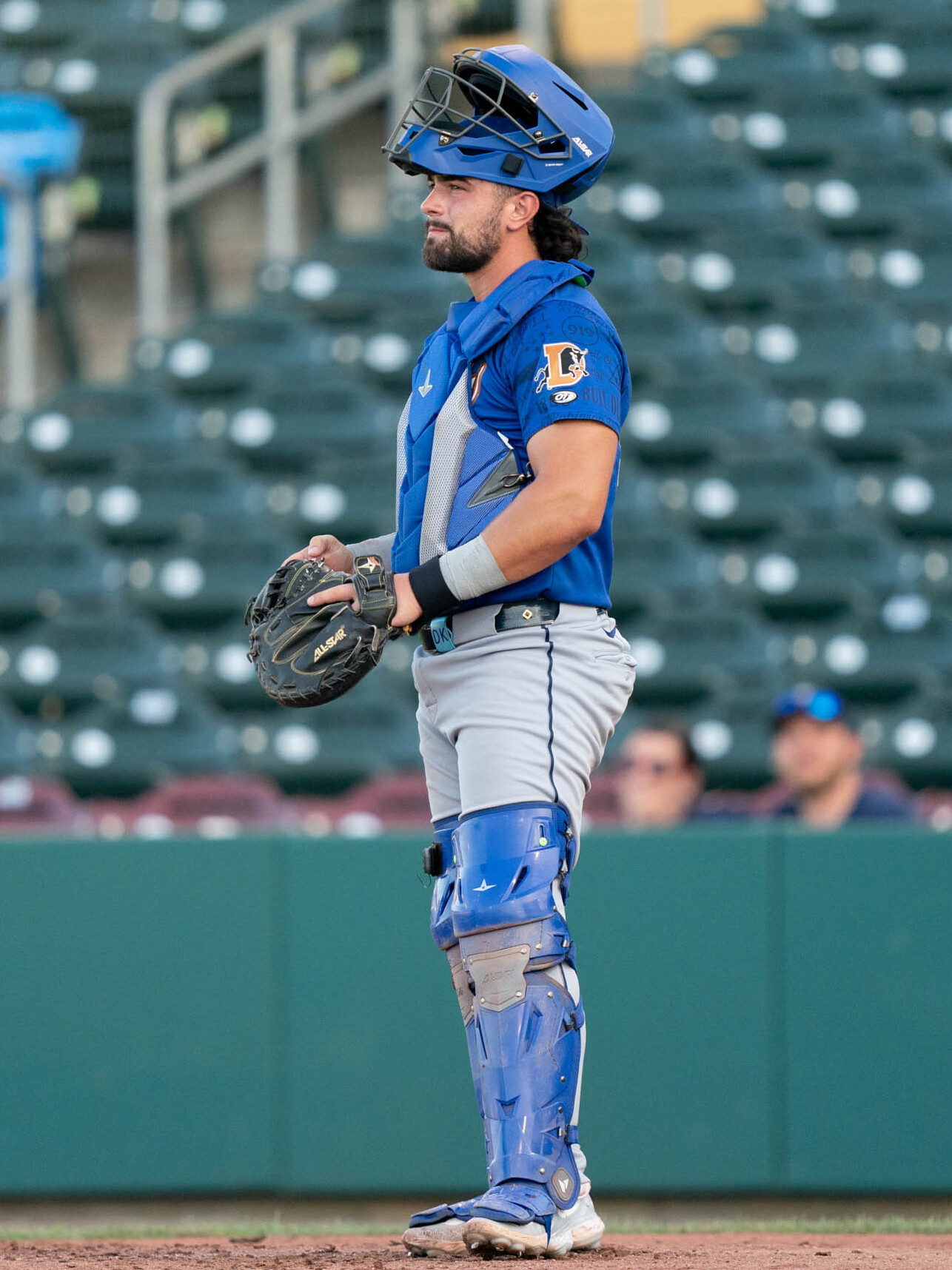
- Keegan with the Durham Bulls in 2025

Baltimore Orioles
- Catcher
- Born: August 1, 2000 (age 26); Methuen, Massachusetts, U.S.
- Bats: Right Throws: Right
- Stats at Baseball Reference

Dominic James Keegan (born August 1, 2000) is an American professional baseball catcher in the Baltimore Orioles organization. Formerly attending the Central Catholic High School in Lawrence, Massachusetts, Keegan committed to Vanderbilt University by June 2017, and played college baseball for the Commodores from 2019 to 2022.

Although the New York Yankees drafted him in the 19th round of the 2021 Major League Baseball draft, Keegan chose to not sign with them and remained at Vanderbilt. Instead, he signed with the Tampa Bay Rays when they drafted him in the fourth round of the 2022 Major League Baseball draft. On August 11, Keegan was assigned to the rookie-level Florida Complex League Rays, the Rays' Florida Complex League affiliate.

== Personal life ==
Keegan was born on August 1, 2000, in Methuen, Massachusetts to James and Kara Keegan. He attended Central Catholic High School in Lawrence, Massachusetts, where he compiled a .402 batting average with 278 at-bats, 75 runs, and 69 runs batted in (RBI). Perfect Game rated him the 14th best catcher nationally out of the class of 2018.

== College career ==
Although Keegan had initially committed to Virginia Tech, he later committed to Vanderbilt University when Pat Mason, Virginia Tech's head baseball coach, was fired in May 2017. Keegan later committed to Vanderbilt by June 2017.

In 2019, he played collegiate summer baseball with the Orleans Firebirds of the Cape Cod Baseball League.

In November 2019, Keegan suffered a blood clot, necessitating surgery on November 16, and another later that month for internal bleeding. He said of the experience: "It was pretty scary, but I had a lot of help, a lot of support from coaches, teammates – my family."

In the 2020 season, cancelled due to the COVID-19 pandemic in the United States, Keegan appeared in nine games, making eight starts.

In 2021, Keegan hit a walk-off single in the second round of the 2021 Southeastern Conference baseball tournament, giving Vanderbilt a 5–4 victory against the Ole Miss Rebels. He also returned to the CCBL, playing with the Yarmouth-Dennis Red Sox.

In 2022, his senior year, Keegan split his time between catching and first base, produced a .366 batting average (fifth in the Conference), and led the team with 12 home runs. He is a member of the First Team All-SEC and a candidate to the Dick Howser Trophy as one of the three catcher semifinalists.

== Professional career ==
=== Tampa Bay Rays ===
The New York Yankees drafted Keegan in the 19th round and the 573rd overall pick of the 2021 Major League Baseball draft. However, he decided to stay at Vanderbilt to "go back and win another championship". Later, the Tampa Bay Rays drafted him in the fourth round and the 134th overall pick of the 2022 Major League Baseball draft, with Keegan stating that he is "super happy" and indicating his willingness to sign with them.

Keegan signed with the Rays on August 9, 2022, and was assigned to the rookie-level Florida Complex League Rays of the Florida Complex League on August 11.

Keegan made 69 appearances for the Triple-A Durham Bulls in 2025, batting .241/.306/.429 with 10 home runs and 36 RBI. On November 18, 2025, the Rays added Keegan to their 40-man roster to protect him from the Rule 5 draft.

Keegan was optioned to Triple-A Durham to begin the 2026 season. In 51 appearances for the Bulls, he slashed .191/.327/.303 with six home runs, 23 RBI, and six stolen bases. On June 23, 2026, Keegan was designated for assignment by the Rays.

=== Baltimore Orioles ===
On June 27, 2026, Keegan was claimed off of waivers by the Baltimore Orioles. On July 1, Keegan was designated for assignment by the Orioles; he cleared waivers and was sent outright to the Double–A Chesapeake Baysox on July 4. In 42 games with Double-A Chesapeake Baysox he batted .196/.335/.362 with 6 home runs and 13 RBIs.
