= 2021 Southeastern Conference baseball tournament =

- Teams: 12
- Format: See below
- Finals site: Hoover Metropolitan Stadium; Hoover, Alabama
- Champions: Arkansas (1st title)
- Winning coach: Dave Van Horn (1st title)
- MVP: Jalen Battles (Arkansas)
- Television: SEC Network, ESPN2 (Championship game)

2021 Southeastern Conference baseball standings
	Conf.				Overall
Team	W		L	PCT	W		L	PCT
Eastern
No. 6 Tennessee ^{x}‍‍‍^{y}	20	–	10	.667	50	–	18	.735
No. 2 Vanderbilt ‍‍‍^{y}	19	–	10	.655	49	–	18	.731
Florida ‍‍‍^{y}	17	–	13	.567	38	–	22	.633
South Carolina ‍‍‍^{y}	16	–	14	.533	34	–	23	.596
Georgia ‍‍‍	13	–	17	.433	31	–	25	.554
Kentucky ‍‍‍	12	–	18	.400	29	–	23	.558
Missouri ‍‍‍	8	–	22	.267	15	–	36	.294
Western
No. 5 Arkansas ^{x}‍†‍‡‍^{y}	22	–	8	.733	50	–	13	.794
No. 1 Mississippi State ‍‍‍^{y}	20	–	10	.667	50	–	18	.735
No. 13 Ole Miss ‍‍‍^{y}	18	–	12	.600	45	–	22	.672
No. 18 LSU ‍‍‍^{y}	13	–	17	.433	38	–	25	.603
Alabama ‍‍‍^{y}	12	–	17	.414	32	–	26	.552
Auburn ‍‍‍	10	–	20	.333	25	–	27	.481
Texas A&M ‍‍‍	9	–	21	.300	29	–	27	.518
x – Division champion † – Conference champion ‡ – Tournament champion y – Invited to the NCAA tournament As of June 30, 2021; Rankings from D1Baseball

The 2021 Southeastern Conference baseball tournament was held from May 25 through 30 at Hoover Metropolitan Stadium in Hoover, Alabama. The annual tournament determined the tournament champion of the Division I Southeastern Conference in college baseball. The Arkansas Razorbacks emerged for the first time as tournament champions, earning the conference's automatic bid to the 2021 NCAA Division I baseball tournament.

The tournament has been held every year since 1977 (with the exception of 2020), with LSU claiming twelve championships, the most of any school. Original members Georgia and Kentucky along with 1993 addition Arkansas and 2013 addition Missouri had previously never won the tournament. This is the twenty-second consecutive year and twenty-fourth overall that the event has scheduled to be held at Hoover Metropolitan Stadium, known from 2007 through 2012 as Regions Park.

== Format and seeding ==
The regular season division winners claim the top two seeds and the next ten teams by conference winning percentage, regardless of division, claim the remaining berths in the tournament. The bottom eight teams play a single-elimination opening round, followed by a double-elimination format until the semifinals, when the format reverts to single elimination through the championship game. This is the eighth year of this format.

Team	W–L	Pct	GB No. 1	Seed
Eastern Division
Tennessee	20–10	.667	2	2
Vanderbilt	19–10	.655	2.5	4
Florida	17–13	.567	5	6
South Carolina	16–14	.533	6	7
Georgia	13–17	.433	9	8
Kentucky	12–18	.400	10	11
Missouri	8–22	.267	14	–

Team	W–L	Pct	GB No. 1	Seed
Western Division
Arkansas	22–8	.733	–	1
Mississippi State	20–10	.667	2	3
Ole Miss	18–12	.600	4	5
LSU	13–17	.433	9	9
Alabama	12–17	.414	9.5	10
Auburn	10–20	.333	12	12
Texas A&M	9–21	.300	13	–

Tiebreakers
Teams	Record	Tiebreaker
(8) Georgia (9) LSU	13–17	UGA vs. ARK, 1–2; LSU vs. ARK, 1–2; UGA vs. TENN, 1–2; LSU vs. TENN, 0–3

== Bracket ==
First round Tuesday, May 25
6	Florida	4
11	Kentucky	1
7	South Carolina	3
10	Alabama	9
8	Georgia	4
9	LSU	1
5	Ole Miss	7
12	Auburn	4

Second round Wednesday, May 26; Thursday, May 27
3	Mississippi State	1
6	Florida	13^{7}
2	Tennessee	2
10	Alabama	3^{11}
3	Mississippi State	2
2	Tennessee	12^{8}
1	Arkansas	11
8	Georgia	2
4	Vanderbilt	5
5	Ole Miss	4
8	Georgia	0
5	Ole Miss	4

Third round Thursday, May 27; Friday, May 28
6	Florida	7
10	Alabama	2
2	Tennessee	11
10	Alabama	0^{7}
1	Arkansas	6
4	Vanderbilt	4
5	Ole Miss	4
4	Vanderbilt	1

Semifinals; Saturday, May 29
6	Florida	0
2	Tennessee	4
1	Arkansas	3
5	Ole Miss	2

Final; Sunday, May 30
2	Tennessee	2
1	Arkansas	7

== Schedule ==
Game	Time*	Matchup^{#}	Television	Attendance
Tuesday, May 25
1	9:30 a.m.	No. 6 Florida vs. No. 11 Kentucky	SEC Network	3,499
2	1:00 p.m.	No. 7 South Carolina vs. No. 10 Alabama	SEC Network	3,499
3	4:30 p.m.	No. 8 Georgia vs. No. 9 LSU	SEC Network	7,750
4	8:00 p.m.	No. 5 Ole Miss vs. No. 12 Auburn	SEC Network	7,750
Wednesday, May 26
5	9:30 a.m.	No. 3 Mississippi State vs. No. 6 Florida	SEC Network	5,235
6	1:00 p.m.	No. 2 Tennessee vs. No. 10 Alabama	SEC Network	5,235
7	4:30 p.m.	No. 1 Arkansas vs. No. 8 Georgia	SEC Network	7,200
8	8:00 p.m.	No. 4 Vanderbilt vs. No. 5 Ole Miss	SEC Network	7,200
Thursday, May 27
9	9:30 a.m.	No. 3 Mississippi State vs. No. 2 Tennessee	SEC Network	4,737
10	1:00 p.m.	No. 8 Georgia vs. No. 5 Ole Miss	SEC Network	4,737
11	4:30 p.m.	No. 6 Florida vs. No. 10 Alabama	SEC Network	8,625
12	8:00 p.m.	No. 1 Arkansas vs. No. 4 Vanderbilt	SEC Network	8,625
Friday, May 28
13	10:00 a.m.	No. 2 Tennessee vs. No. 10 Alabama	SEC Network	5,901
14	1:30 p.m.	No. 5 Ole Miss vs. No. 4 Vanderbilt	SEC Network	5,901
Semifinals – Saturday, May 29
15	Noon	No. 2 Tennessee vs. No. 6 Florida	SEC Network	8,735
16	3:30 p.m.	No. 5 Ole Miss vs. No. 1 Arkansas	SEC Network	8,735
Championship – Sunday, May 30
17	2:00 p.m.	No. 2 Tennessee vs. No. 1 Arkansas	ESPN2	10,176
*Game times in CDT. # – Rankings denote tournament seed.

== Umpires ==
- Tony Walsh
- Jeff Head
- Scott Cline
- Scott Kennedy
- Kevin Sweeney
- Ray Gregson
- Eddie Newsom
- Eric Goshay
- Damien Beal
- Mo Hodges
- Brandon Cooper
- Brian deBrauwere
