= Condron Ballpark =

Baseball park at University of Florida

Condron Family Ballpark
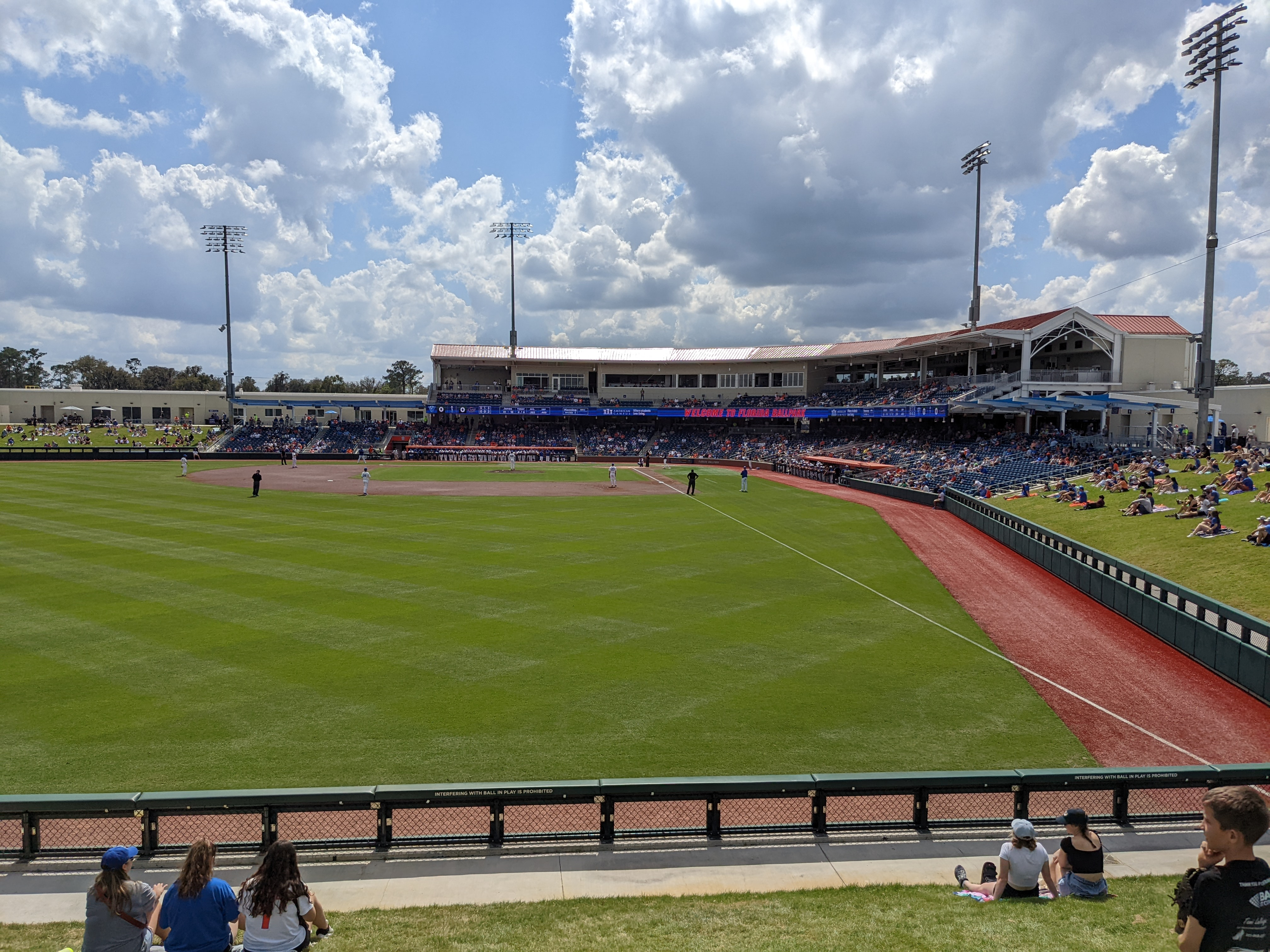

- Location within Florida Location within the United States
- Interactive map of Condron Family Ballpark
- Full name: Condron Family Ballpark at Alfred A. McKethan Field
- Former names: Florida Ballpark at Alfred A. McKethan Field (2021–2022)
- Address: 2800 Citrus Road
- Location: Gainesville, Florida, 32611
- Coordinates: 29° 38′ 10.94″ N 82° 21′ 49.63″ W
- Owner: University of Florida
- Operator: University Athletic Association
- Seating type: 4,000 chairback 700 club 2,300 berm
- Capacity: 7,000 (expandable to 10,000)
- Type: Stadium
- Event: Baseball
- Surface: Grass
- Scoreboard: Daktronics
- Record attendance: 9,303 (March 1, 2025)
- Field size: LF: 330' (100.6m); LC: 380' (115.8m); CF: 400' (121.9m); RC: 380' (115.8m); RF: 330' (100.6m)

Construction
- Groundbreaking: February 2019
- Built: August 2020
- Opened: February 19, 2021
- Cost: $65 million
- Architects: Populous, Walker Architects
- General contractor: Brasfield & Gorrie

Tenant
- Florida Gators baseball (NCAA) 2021–present

Website
- Florida Ballpark

Condron Family Ballpark at Alfred A. McKethan Field is the college baseball stadium of the University of Florida, and serves as the home field for the Florida Gators baseball team. Condron Ballpark is located on the university's Gainesville, Florida campus, adjacent to the university's softball stadium, Katie Seashole Pressly Stadium, and its lacrosse stadium, Dizney Stadium. It replaced the former ballpark, Alfred A. McKethan Stadium at Perry Field, which had been the home of Florida baseball from 1988 through 2020; McKethan Stadium's earlier incarnation, known simply as Perry Field, had been the home field of Gator baseball since 1949. The stadium opened on February 19, 2021, when the Gators hosted Miami in their season opener.

== Namesakes ==
The playing surface is named for Alfred A. McKethan, a University of Florida alumnus and successful Florida banker, businessman, and politician who contributed major donations to the Florida athletic program. McKethan donated the equivalent of $800,000 for the reconstruction and improvement of UF's baseball facilities in the 1980s and 1990s, and the stadium built at Perry Field was named in his honor.

The stadium itself is named for Gary Condron, another UF alumnus and founder of the Conlan Company, one of the nation’s top manufacturers of light-industrial complexes. Condron played baseball for the Gators in the 1970s as a walk-on and has donated at least $30 million for the construction of the Hawkins Academic Center, the renovation of the Stephen C. O’Connell Center, and the construction of the stadium itself. Florida Ballpark was rechristened "Condron Family Ballpark" on April 22, 2022, immediately before Florida hosted a game against Tennessee.

== Facilities ==
The current stadium facility is a concrete and steel structure that seats approximately 7,000 fans, and includes a press box, concession stands, locker rooms for the home and visiting teams, and coaching staff offices. The stadium includes 4,000 chairbacks, 700 club seats, and berm seating for over 2,000 spectators. The design incorporates a 360-degree concourse, shade canopy, and open-air seated grandstand.

The stadium is lighted for night games and features a natural grass and clay playing surface with a synthetic turf backstop.

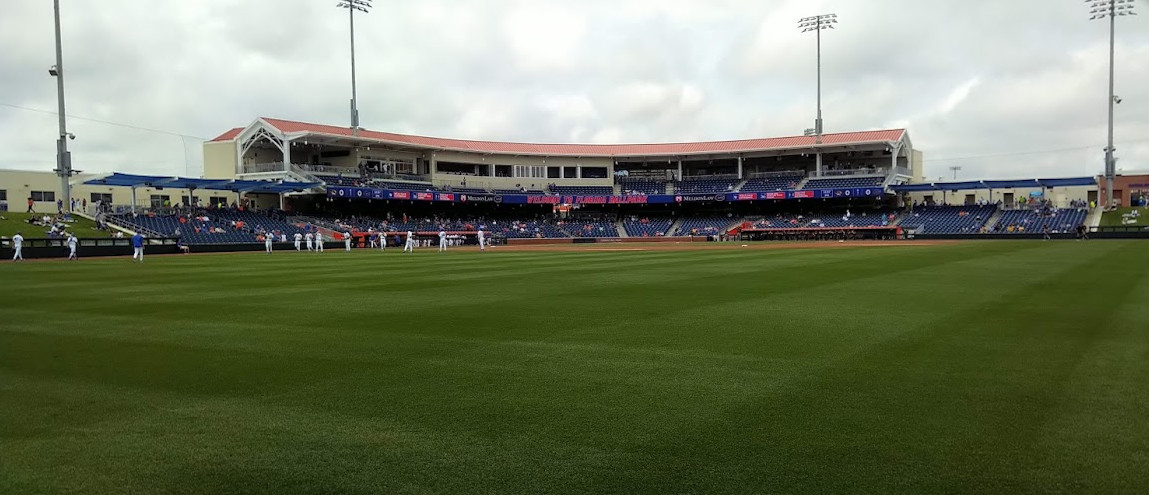
View of the grandstands from the outfield

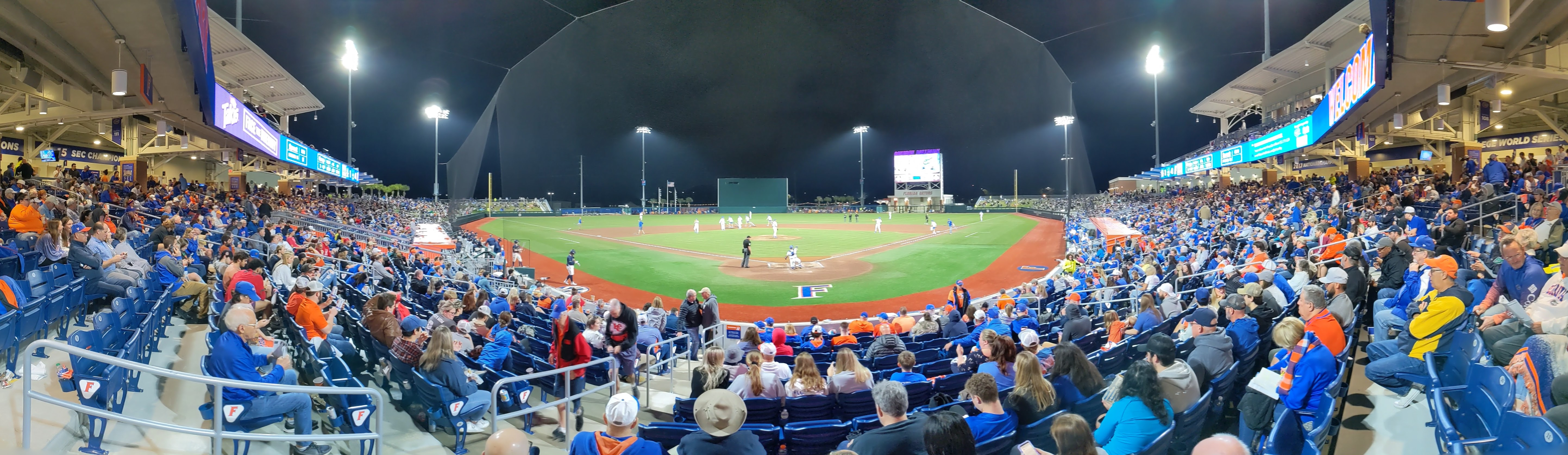
Seating from behind home plate

NCAA Tournament at Condron Ballpark
**Regionals**	2021, 2022, **2023**, 2026
**Super Regionals**	**2023**

Won by Florida in bold

== See also ==
- Buildings at the University of Florida
- Florida Gators
- History of the University of Florida
- List of NCAA Division I baseball venues
- University Athletic Association
