= 2021 Missouri Tigers baseball team =

American college baseball season

2021 Missouri Tigers baseball
- Conference: Southeastern Conference
- Eastern Division
- Record: 16-36 (8–22 SEC)
- Head coach: Steve Bieser (5th season)
- Assistant coaches: Fred Corral (4th year); Jason Hagerty (1st year)
- Home stadium: Taylor Stadium

2021 Southeastern Conference baseball standings
	Conf.				Overall
Team	W		L	PCT	W		L	PCT
Eastern
No. 6 Tennessee ^{x}‍‍‍^{y}	20	–	10	.667	50	–	18	.735
No. 2 Vanderbilt ‍‍‍^{y}	19	–	10	.655	49	–	18	.731
Florida ‍‍‍^{y}	17	–	13	.567	38	–	22	.633
South Carolina ‍‍‍^{y}	16	–	14	.533	34	–	23	.596
Georgia ‍‍‍	13	–	17	.433	31	–	25	.554
Kentucky ‍‍‍	12	–	18	.400	29	–	23	.558
Missouri ‍‍‍	8	–	22	.267	15	–	36	.294
Western
No. 5 Arkansas ^{x}‍†‍‡‍^{y}	22	–	8	.733	50	–	13	.794
No. 1 Mississippi State ‍‍‍^{y}	20	–	10	.667	50	–	18	.735
No. 13 Ole Miss ‍‍‍^{y}	18	–	12	.600	45	–	22	.672
No. 18 LSU ‍‍‍^{y}	13	–	17	.433	38	–	25	.603
Alabama ‍‍‍^{y}	12	–	17	.414	32	–	26	.552
Auburn ‍‍‍	10	–	20	.333	25	–	27	.481
Texas A&M ‍‍‍	9	–	21	.300	29	–	27	.518
x – Division champion † – Conference champion ‡ – Tournament champion y – Invited to the NCAA tournament As of June 30, 2021; Rankings from D1Baseball

The 2021 Missouri Tigers baseball team represented the University of Missouri in the 2021 NCAA Division I baseball season. The Tigers played their home games at Taylor Stadium under fifth year coach Steve Bieser.

== Previous season ==
The 2020 Missouri Tigers baseball team finished the regular season with a 11–5 (0–0) record. The season ended on March 12, 2020 due to concerns over the COVID-19 pandemic.

=== 2020 MLB draft ===
The Tigers had one player drafted in the 2020 MLB draft shortened draft, from 40 rounds down to five.

Player	Position	Round	Overall	MLB Team
Ian Bedell	Pitcher	4	122	St. Louis Cardinals

== Personnel ==
=== Roster ===
2021 Missouri Tigers baseball team
Players
Coaches

#	Pos.	Name	B/T	Height	Weight	Year	Home town
1	OF	Josh Holt Jr.	L/R	5 ft 9 in (1.75 m)	160 lb (73 kg)	Jr	Hampton, GA
2	C	Mike Coletta	R/R	5 ft 11 in (1.8 m)	200 lb (91 kg)	Jr	Flushing, NY
3	C	Tre Morris	R/R	5 ft 10 in (1.78 m)	190 lb (86 kg)	Jr	Columbia, MO
4	P	Tommy Springer	R/R	6 ft 1 in (1.85 m)	205 lb (93 kg)	Jr	Apple Valley, MN
6	INF	Art Schoenstadt	L/R	5 ft 8 in (1.73 m)	181 lb (82 kg)	So	Sammamish, WA
7		Jackson Lancaster	L/L	6 ft 1 in (1.85 m)	195 lb (88 kg)	Sr	Corinth, MS
8		Seth Halvorsen	R/R	6 ft 2 in (1.88 m)	225 lb (102 kg)	RS So	Plymouth, MN
9	INF	Mark Verling	R/R	5 ft 10 in (1.78 m)	188 lb (85 kg)	Sr	St. Louis, MO
10	OF	Clayton Peterson	R/R	5 ft 10 in (1.78 m)	178 lb (81 kg)	Sr	Edmond, OK
11	P	Konnor Ash	R/R	5 ft 11 in (1.8 m)	191 lb (87 kg)	Sr	Plainfield, IL
12	INF	Joshua Day	R/R	6 ft 2 in (1.88 m)	200 lb (91 kg)	Jr	Natchez, MS
13	INF	Cameron Swanger	R/R	6 ft 5 in (1.96 m)	210 lb (95 kg)	Jr	Loveland, OH
14	OF	Alex Peterson	R/R	5 ft 10 in (1.78 m)	185 lb (84 kg)	Sr	Edmond, OK
16		Luke Mann	L/R	6 ft 2 in (1.88 m)	200 lb (91 kg)	RS So	St. Louis, MO
17	P	Ben Pedersen	R/R	6 ft 6 in (1.98 m)	227 lb (103 kg)	So	Duluth, MN
18	P	Jared Simpson	L/L	6 ft 4 in (1.93 m)	208 lb (94 kg)	Jr	Clinton, IA
20	C	Chad McDaniel	S/R	6 ft 3 in (1.91 m)	215 lb (98 kg)	Sr	Coral Springs, FL
21	INF	Brandt Belk	L/R	6 ft 3 in (1.91 m)	181 lb (82 kg)	RS Sr	Houston, TX
23	INF	Andrew Keefer	R/R	6 ft 2 in (1.88 m)	195 lb (88 kg)	Gr	Allen, TX
24	INF	Dalton McNamara	L/R	5 ft 11 in (1.8 m)	180 lb (82 kg)	So	Lino Lakes, MN
25	INF	Paul Winland	L/R	6 ft 3 in (1.91 m)	208 lb (94 kg)	Fr	Beaufort, SC
26	INF	Torin Montgomery	L/R	6 ft 3 in (1.91 m)	230 lb (104 kg)	So	Kirkland, WA
27	P	Andrew Vail	L/L	6 ft 1 in (1.85 m)	185 lb (84 kg)	Jr	Woodstown, NJ
28	C	Garrison Bennett	R/R	5 ft 8 in (1.73 m)	162 lb (73 kg)	So	Green Oaks, IL
29	P	Shane Wilhelm	R/R	5 ft 10 in (1.78 m)	190 lb (86 kg)	So	Columbia, IL
30		Ty Wilmsmeyer	R/R	6 ft 1 in (1.85 m)	185 lb (84 kg)	So	Springfield, MO
32	P	Drew Garrett	R/R	6 ft 6 in (1.98 m)	205 lb (93 kg)	Jr	Columbia, MO
35	P	Spencer Miles	R/R	6 ft 3 in (1.91 m)	180 lb (82 kg)	So	Columbia, MO
36	P	Parker Wright	R/R	6 ft 3 in (1.91 m)	208 lb (94 kg)	Fr	Columbia, MO
37	P	Holden Phelps	R/R	6 ft 5 in (1.96 m)	217 lb (98 kg)	Fr	Crystal Lake, IL
38	P	Jacob Kush	R/R	5 ft 10 in (1.78 m)	175 lb (79 kg)	Jr	Guelph, ON
39	P	Lukas Veinbergs	R/R	6 ft 0 in (1.83 m)	198 lb (90 kg)	Gr	Pinckney, MI
40	P	Austin Troesser	R/R	6 ft 3 in (1.91 m)	160 lb (73 kg)	Fr	Loose Creek, MO
41	P	Zach Hise	R/R	6 ft 5 in (1.96 m)	210 lb (95 kg)	Fr	Joliet, IL
42	P	Cameron Pferrer	R/R	5 ft 11 in (1.8 m)	182 lb (83 kg)	Sr	Carmel, IN
43	P	Spencer Juergens	R/R	6 ft 4 in (1.93 m)	230 lb (104 kg)	Gr	Washington, MO
44	INF	Trevor Austin	R/R	5 ft 10 in (1.78 m)	188 lb (85 kg)	Fr	Jefferson City, MO
45	OF	CJ Cepicky	R/R	6 ft 4 in (1.93 m)	188 lb (85 kg)	Fr	St. Louis, MO
46	P	Ian Lohse	L/L	6 ft 0 in (1.83 m)	182 lb (83 kg)	Fr	St. Louis, MO
47	P	Trey Dillard	R/R	6 ft 0 in (1.83 m)	195 lb (88 kg)	Sr	Phoenix, AZ
48	P	Trae Robertson	L/L	6 ft 5 in (1.96 m)	190 lb (86 kg)	Jr	Columbia, MO
49	C	Garrett Rice	R/R	6 ft 2 in (1.88 m)	240 lb (109 kg)	Fr	Willard, MO
51	P	Brenner Maloney	L/L	6 ft 2 in (1.88 m)	215 lb (98 kg)	So	Liberty, MO
52	OF	Ross Lovich	L/L	6 ft 0 in (1.83 m)	170 lb (77 kg)	Fr	Overland Park, KS
54	INF	Jackson Beaman	R/R	6 ft 1 in (1.85 m)	205 lb (93 kg)	Fr	Lincoln, MO
56	INF	Nathan Chester	R/R	6 ft 0 in (1.83 m)	185 lb (84 kg)	Fr	Kansas City, MO
57	INF	William Fricker	R/R	6 ft 3 in (1.91 m)	195 lb (88 kg)	Fr	Kansas City, MO
58	P	Caden Griffin	L/L	6 ft 0 in (1.83 m)	160 lb (73 kg)	Fr	Ottawa, ON
59	OF	Christian Long	R/R	6 ft 1 in (1.85 m)	205 lb (93 kg)	Gr	Houston, TX
61	P	Gabe Nutter	R/R	5 ft 11 in (1.8 m)	180 lb (82 kg)	Fr	Kansas City, MO
62	P	Kyle Potthoff	R/R	6 ft 5 in (1.96 m)	190 lb (86 kg)	So	Chesterfield, MO
63	C	Eric Rinzel	R/R	6 ft 2 in (1.88 m)	194 lb (88 kg)	So	Chanhassen, MN
64	P	Steven Sanchez	L/L	6 ft 5 in (1.96 m)	232 lb (105 kg)	RS So	Mundelein, IL
65	C	Nick Schmit	S/R	6 ft 1 in (1.85 m)	185 lb (84 kg)	Fr	Redondo Beach, CA
68	P	Chase Van Dyk	L/L	6 ft 2 in (1.88 m)	150 lb (68 kg)	Jr	Frisco, TX

Head coach

Steve Bieser

Assistant coach(es)

Fred Corral
Jason Hagerty

Legend

- (C) Team captain
- (S) Suspended
- (I) Ineligible
- Injured
- Current redshirt

=== Coaching staff ===
2021 Missouri Tigers coaching staff
Name	Position
Steve Bieser	Head coach
Fred Corral	Pitching Coach/Recruiting Coordinator
Jason Hagerty	Hitting Coach
Tyler Packanik	Volunteer Assistant Coach
Alex Barton	Graduate Assistant (Operations)
Matt Ridgway	Athletic Trainer

== Schedule and results ==
2021 Missouri Tigers baseball game log
Regular season (12–24)

February (3–5)
Date	Opponent	Rank	Site/stadium	Score	Win	Loss	Save	TV	Attendance	Overall record	SEC record
Feb. 19	at Grand Canyon		GCU Stadium; Phoenix, AZ	**L** 3–11	Barnes (1–0)	**Miles** (0–1)		GCU-TV	645	0–1	–
Feb. 20	at Grand Canyon		GCU Stadium	**L** 4–8	Ohl (1–0)	**Vail** (0–1)			645	0–2	–
Feb. 20	at Grand Canyon		GCU Stadium	**W** 9–7	**Juergens** (1–0)	McCarville (0–1)	**Hise** (1)	GCU-TV	645	1–2	–
Feb. 21	at Grand Canyon		GCU Stadium	**L** 3–10	Young (1–0)	**Robertson** (0–1)		GCU-TV	645	1–3	–
Feb. 26	Omaha		Taylor Stadium; Columbia, MO	**W** 12–10	**Miles** (1–1)	Machado (0–1)	**Hise** (2)		600	2–3	–
Feb. 27	Omaha		Taylor Stadium	**L** 11–17	Timmins (1–0)	**Vail** (0–2)			600	2–4	–
Feb. 27	Omaha		Taylor Stadium	**W** 10–1	**Halvorsen** (1–0)	Smith (0–1)	**Lohse** (1)	SECN+	600	3–4	–
Feb. 28	Omaha		Taylor Stadium	**L** 3–9	Scott (1–0)	**Hise** (0–1)			600	3–5	–

March (5–11)
Date	Opponent	Rank	Site/stadium	Score	Win	Loss	Save	TV	Attendance	Overall record	SEC record
Mar. 4	vs. Dallas Baptist; Frisco College Baseball Classic		Dr Pepper Ballpark; Frisco, TX	**L** 2–3	Kouba (1–0)	**Lohse** (0–1)	Russell (1)			3–6	–
Mar. 5	vs. Dallas Baptist; Frisco College Baseball Classic		Dr Pepper Ballpark	**L** 0–8	Hamel (3–0)	**Miles** (1–2)				3–7	–
Mar. 6	vs. Oklahoma; Frisco College Baseball Classic		Dr Pepper Ballpark	**L** 6–16	Carter (1–0)	**Juergens** (1–1)				3–8	–
Mar. 7	vs. Arizona; Frisco College Baseball Classic		Dr Pepper Ballpark	**L** 4–8	Nichols (3–0)	**Hise** (0–2)				3–9	–
Mar. 10	at Saint Louis		Billiken Sports Center; St. Louis, MO	**W** 2–1	**Lohse** (1–1)	Sheehan (1–1)			104	4–9	–
Mar. 12	at Illinois State		Duffy Bass Field; Normal, IL	**W** 7–0	**Kush** (1–0)	Salata (1–3)		ESPN+	100	5–9	–
Mar. 13	at Illinois State		Duffy Bass Field	**L** 1–10	Lussier (2–1)	**Hise** (0–3)			175	5–10	–
Mar. 13	at Illinois State		Duffy Bass Field	**W** 12–2	**Holverson** (2–0)	Sinsko (1–2)		ESPN+	175	6–10	–
Mar. 14	at Illinois State		Duffy Bass Field	**W** 12–7	**Juergens** (2–1)	Mabee (1–2)	**Lohse** (2)		100	7–10	–
Mar. 19	at Kentucky		Kentucky Proud Park; Lexington	**L** 2–10	Stupp (3–0)	**Miles** (1–3)		SECN+	1,050	7–11	0–1
Mar. 20	at Kentucky		Kentucky Proud Park	**L** 4–5	Harney (1–0)	**Lohse** (1–2)		SECN+	1,122	7–12	0–2
Mar. 21	at Kentucky		Kentucky Proud Park	**W** 5–3	**Ash** (1–0)	Marsh (0–1)	**Veinbergs** (1)	SECN+	1,140	8–12	1–2
Mar. 25	#1 Vanderbilt		Taylor Stadium	**L** 2–10	Rocker (6–0)	**Miles** (1–4)	Hliboki (1)	SECN+	600	8–13	1–3
Mar. 26	#1 Vanderbilt		Taylor Stadium	**L** 3–11	Leiter (6–0)	**Holverson** (2–1)		SECN+	600	8–14	1–4
Mar. 27	#1 Vanderbilt		Taylor Stadium	**L** 1–3	Schultz (2–2)	**Ash** (1–1)	Murphy (4)	SECN+	600	8–15	1–5
Mar. 30	at Kansas		Hoglund Ballpark; Lawrence, KS	**L** 9–10	Hegarty (3–1)	**Pedersen** (0–1)	Ulane (5)	ESPN+	425	8–16	–

April (4–11)
Date	Opponent	Rank	Site/stadium	Score	Win	Loss	Save	TV	Attendance	Overall record	SEC record
Apr. 1	Texas A&M		Taylor Stadium	**L** 2–16	Saenz (5–2)	**Miles** (1–5)		SECN+	600	8–17	1–6
Apr. 2	Texas A&M		Taylor Stadium	**W** 8–2	**Halvorsen** (3–1)	Childress (2–3)		SECN+	600	9–17	2–6
Apr. 3	Texas A&M		Taylor Stadium	**W** 7–3	**Kush** (2–0)	Weber (1–1)		SECN+	600	10–17	3–6
Apr. 9	at #11 South Carolina		Founders Park; Columbia, SC	**W** 7–2	**Veinbergs** (1–0)	Farr (2–2)		SECN+	1,938	11–17	4–6
Apr. 10	at #11 South Carolina		Founders Park	**L** 1–11	Jordan (4–2)	**Miles** (1–6)	Lloyd (1)	SECN+	1,938	11–18	4–7
Apr. 11	at #11 South Carolina		Founders Park	**L** 4–13	Kerry (3–0)	**Hise** (0–4)		SECN+	1,938	11–19	4–8
Apr. 13	Missouri State		Taylor Stadium	**L** 5–7	Wiley (4–1)	**Robertson** (0–2)	Juenger (2)	SECN+	600	11–20	–
Apr. 16	at #18 Florida		Florida Ballpark; Gainesville, FL	**L** 5–8	Scott (2–2)	**Halvorsen** (3–2)		SECN+	2,102	11–21	4–9
Apr. 17	at #18 Florida		Florida Ballpark	**L** 6–8	Leftwich (6–2)	**Veinbergs** (1–1)		SECN+	2,628	11–22	4–10
Apr. 17	at #18 Florida		Florida Ballpark	**L** 4–6	Barco (5–2)	**Hise** (0–5)	Van Der Weide (1)	SECN+	2,236	11–23	4–11
Apr. 20	Missouri State		Hammons Field; Springfield, MO	Cancelled due to COVID-19 issues within the Missouri State program							
Apr. 23	Georgia		Taylor Stadium	**W** 6–4	**Halvorsen** (4–2)	Webb (2–3)		SECN+	600	12–23	5–11
Apr. 24	Georgia		Taylor Stadium	**L** 5–7^{10}	Harris (4–0)	**Veinbergs** (1–2)	Pasqua (2)	SECN+	600	12–24	5–12
Apr. 25	Georgia		Taylor Stadium	**L** 4–9	Polk (2–0)	**Hise** (0–6)		SECN+	600	12–25	5–13
Apr. 27	at Kansas State		Frank Myers Field at Tointon Family Stadium; Manhattan, KS	**L** 8–13	Phillips (1–0)	**Robertson** (0–3)			517	12–26	–
Apr. 30	at Alabama		Sewell-Thomas Stadium; Tuscaloosa, AL	**L** 8–11	Freeman (1–1)	**Kush** (2–1)	Lee (5)	SECN+	1,958	12–27	5–14

May (3–9)
Date	Opponent	Rank	Site/stadium	Score	Win	Loss	Save	TV	Attendance	Overall record	SEC record
May 1	at Alabama		Sewell-Thomas Stadium	**L** 2–5	Smith (1–5)	**Ash** (1–2)	Green (2)	SECN+	2,199	12–28	5–15
May 2	at Alabama		Sewell-Thomas Stadium	**L** 2–3	Freeman (2–1)	**Veinbergs** (1–3)	Lee (6)	SECN+	1,656	12–29	5–16
May 4	Southeast Missouri State		Taylor Stadium							–	–
May 7	#5 Tennessee		Taylor Stadium	**L** 4–5	Dallas (8–1)	**Kush** (2–2)	Hunley (5)	SECN+	600	12–30	5–17
May 8	#5 Tennessee		Taylor Stadium	**L** 4–11	Sewell (2–0)	**Ash** (1–3)		SECN	600	12–31	5–18
May 9	#5 Tennessee		Taylor Stadium	**L** 2–10	Tidwell (6–2)	**Hise** (0–7)		SECN+	600	12–32	5–19
May 13	at #3 Mississippi State		Dudy Noble Field, Polk–DeMent Stadium; Starkville, MS	**L** 4–5	Johnson (3–0)	**Veinbergs** (1–4)	Sims (7)	ESPNU	7,444	13–33	5–20
May 14	at #3 Mississippi State		Dudy Noble Field, Polk–DeMent Stadium	**W** 7–6	**Miles** (2–7)	Smimmons (1–1)		SECN+	8,470	13–33	6–20
May 15	at #3 Mississippi State		Dudy Noble Field, Polk–DeMent Stadium	**W** 16–8	**Pedersen** (1–1)	Harding (5–2)		SECN+	8,730	15–33	7–20
May 18	Kansas		Taylor Stadium	**L** 8–9	Vanderhei (1–0)	**Phelps** (0–1)	Ulane (10)	SECN	927	15–34	–
May 20	Auburn		Taylor Stadium	**L** 6–15	Owen (2–4)	**Kush** (2–3)		SECN+	871	15–35	7–21
May 21	Auburm		Taylor Stadium	**L** 0–3	Fitts (–)	**Halvorsen** (4–3)	Skipper	SECN+		15–36	7–22
May 22	Auburn		Taylor Stadium	**W** 7–6	**Lancaster** (1–0)	Barnett (2–4)	**Miles** (1)	SECN+	903	16–36	8–22

Legend: = Win = Loss = Cancelled
Bold = Missouri team member

Schedule source:

*Rankings are based on the team's current ranking in the D1Baseball poll.

== Record vs. conference opponents ==
Last two do not qualify for conf. tourn. Blank are not scheduled. Blue are home games, otherwise away.

2021 SEC baseball records Source: 2021 SEC baseball game results, 2021 SEC baseball schedule
Team	W–L	ALA	ARK	AUB	FLA	UGA	KEN	LSU	MSU	MIZZ	MISS	SCAR	TENN	TAMU	VAN	Team	Div	SR	SW
ALA	12–17		1–2	2–1	.	.	1–2	1–2	0–3	3–0	0–3	.	1–2	3–0	0–2	ALA	W5	3–7	2–2
ARK	22–8	2–1		2–1	3–0	2–1	.	2–1	3–0	.	2–1	2–1	2–1	2–1	.	ARK	W1	10–0	2–0
AUB	10–20	1–2	1–2		1–2	2–1	0–3	1–2	0–3	2–1	0–3	.	.	2–1	.	AUB	W6	3–7	0–3
FLA	17–13	.	0–3	2–1		2–1	2–1	.	.	3–0	2–1	0–3	1–2	3–0	2–1	FLA	E3	7–3	2–2
UGA	13–17	.	1–2	1–2	1–2		2–1	.	.	2–1	1–2	1–2	1–2	1–2	2–1	UGA	E5	3–7	0–0
KEN	12–18	2–1	.	3–0	1–2	1–2		1–2	0–3	2–1	.	0–3	1–2	.	1–2	KEN	E6	3–7	1–2
LSU	13–17	2–1	1–2	2–1	.	.	2–1		1–2	.	2–1	1–2	0–3	2–1	0–3	LSU	W4	5–5	0–2
MSU	20–10	3–0	0–3	3–0	.	.	3–0	2–1		1–2	2–1	2–1	.	3–0	1–2	MSU	W2	7–3	4–1
MIZZ	8–22	0–3	.	1–2	0–3	1–2	1–2	.	2–1		.	1–2	0–3	2–1	0–3	MIZZ	E7	2–8	0–4
MISS	18–12	3–0	1–2	3–0	1–2	2–1	.	1–2	1–2	.		3–0	.	1–2	2–1	MISS	W3	5–5	3–0
SCAR	16–14	.	1–2	.	3–0	2–1	3–0	2–1	1–2	2–1	0–3		1–2	.	1–2	SCAR	E4	5–5	2–1
TENN	20–10	2–1	1–2	.	2–1	2–1	2–1	3–0	.	3–0	.	2–1		2–1	1–2	TENN	E1	8–2	2–0
TAMU	9–21	0–3	1–2	1–2	0–3	2–1	.	1–2	0–3	1–2	2–1	.	1–2		.	TAMU	W7	2–8	0–3
VAN	19–10	2–0	.	.	1–2	1–2	2–1	3–0	2–1	3–0	1–2	2–1	2–1	.		VAN	E2	7–3	2–0
Team	W–L	ALA	ARK	AUB	FLA	UGA	KEN	LSU	MSU	MIZZ	MISS	SCAR	TENN	TAMU	VAN	Team	Div	SR	SW

Updated for entire regular season.

== 2021 MLB draft ==
Player	Position	Round	Overall	MLB team
Seth Halvorsen	RHP	19	565	Philadelphia Phillies
