= 2021 Mississippi State Bulldogs baseball team =

Season for American intercollegiate baseball squad

2021 Mississippi State Bulldogs baseball

Starkville Regional champions Starkville Super Regional champions

College World Series National champions
- Conference: Southeastern Conference
- Western Division
- Record: 50–18 (20–10 SEC)
- Head coach: Chris Lemonis (3rd season)
- Assistant coaches: Scott Foxhall; Jake Gautreau
- Home stadium: Dudy Noble Field, Polk–DeMent Stadium

2021 Southeastern Conference baseball standings
	Conf.				Overall
Team	W		L	PCT	W		L	PCT
Eastern
No. 6 Tennessee ^{x}‍‍‍^{y}	20	–	10	.667	50	–	18	.735
No. 2 Vanderbilt ‍‍‍^{y}	19	–	10	.655	49	–	18	.731
Florida ‍‍‍^{y}	17	–	13	.567	38	–	22	.633
South Carolina ‍‍‍^{y}	16	–	14	.533	34	–	23	.596
Georgia ‍‍‍	13	–	17	.433	31	–	25	.554
Kentucky ‍‍‍	12	–	18	.400	29	–	23	.558
Missouri ‍‍‍	8	–	22	.267	15	–	36	.294
Western
No. 5 Arkansas ^{x}‍†‍‡‍^{y}	22	–	8	.733	50	–	13	.794
No. 1 Mississippi State ‍‍‍^{y}	20	–	10	.667	50	–	18	.735
No. 13 Ole Miss ‍‍‍^{y}	18	–	12	.600	45	–	22	.672
No. 18 LSU ‍‍‍^{y}	13	–	17	.433	38	–	25	.603
Alabama ‍‍‍^{y}	12	–	17	.414	32	–	26	.552
Auburn ‍‍‍	10	–	20	.333	25	–	27	.481
Texas A&M ‍‍‍	9	–	21	.300	29	–	27	.518
x – Division champion † – Conference champion ‡ – Tournament champion y – Invited to the NCAA tournament As of June 30, 2021; Rankings from D1Baseball

The 2021 Mississippi State Bulldogs baseball team represented Mississippi State University in the 2021 NCAA Division I baseball season. The Bulldogs played their home games at Dudy Noble Field, Polk–DeMent Stadium. Mississippi State won the 2021 College World Series (CWS) Championship over Vanderbilt giving the Bulldogs their first team national championship in any team sport.

== Preseason ==
=== SEC Coaches poll ===
The SEC coaches poll was released on February 11, 2021, with Mississippi State predicted to finish second in the Western Division, receiving three out of fourteen Western Division first place votes. Mississippi State also received one overall conference first place vote. Florida received twelve overall conference first place votes and Vanderbilt also received one.

Coaches poll (West Division)
Predicted finish	Team	Votes (1st place)
1	Ole Miss	78 (7)
2	Mississippi State	73 (3)
3	Arkansas	72 (2)
4	LSU	63 (2)
5	Texas A&M	36
6	Auburn	32
7	Alabama	31

Coaches poll (East Division)
Predicted finish	Team	Votes (1st place)
1	Florida	91 (13)
2	Vanderbilt	79 (1)
3	Tennessee	58
4	South Carolina	55
5	Georgia	51
6	Missouri	28
7	Kentucky	23

=== Preseason All-SEC teams ===
First Team

- OF: Tanner Allen

Second Team

- 1B: Josh Hatcher
- OF: Rowdey Jordan

== Schedule and results ==
2021 Mississippi State Bulldogs baseball game log
Regular season (40–13)

February (5–2)
Date	Opponent	Rank	Site/stadium	Score	Win	Loss	Save	TV	Attendance	Overall record	SEC record
State Farm College Baseball Showdown
February 20 ^{[1]}	vs. No. 9 Texas	No. 7	Globe Life Field • Arlington, TX	**W** 8–3	**Landon Sims (1–0)**	Ty Madden (0–1)	none	FloBaseball	16,908	1–0	–
February 21^{[1]}	vs. No. 10 TCU	No. 7	Globe Life Field • Arlington, TX	**L** 2–3	Russell Smith (1–0)	**Houston Harding (0–1)**	Garrett Wright (1)	FloBaseball	17,587	1–1	–
February 22 ^{[1]}	vs. No. 3 Texas Tech	No. 7	Globe Life Field • Arlington, TX	**W** 11–5	**Carlisle Koestler (1–0)**	Jamie Hitt (0–1)	none	FloBaseball	13,659	2–1	–
February 23	Jackson State	No. 5	Dudy Noble Field • Starkville, MS	**postponed to 2/24, scheduling conflict**							
February 24	Jackson State	No. 5	Dudy Noble Field • Starkville, MS	**W** 7–3	**Brandon Smith (1–0)**	Nikelle Galatas (0–2)	none	SECN+	2,007	3–1	–
February 26	Tulane	No. 5	Dudy Noble Field • Starkville, MS	**L** 3–7	Braden Olthoff (1–0)	**Christian MacLeod (0–1)**	none	SECN+	2,442	3–2	–
February 27	Tulane	No. 5	Dudy Noble Field • Starkville, MS	**W** 9–5	**Stone Simmons (1–0)**	Trent Johnson (0–1)	none	SECN+	2,473	4–2	–
February 28	Tulane	No. 5	Dudy Noble Field • Starkville, MS	**W** 5–4	**Spencer Price (1–0)**	Keagan Gillies (0–1)	none	SECN+	2,456	5–2	–

March (12–5)
Date	Opponent	Rank	Site/stadium	Score	Win	Loss	Save	TV	Attendance	Overall record	SEC record
March 2	vs. Southern Miss	No. 3	Trustmark Park • Pearl, MS	**postponed to 3/3, impending weather**							
March 3	vs. Southern Miss	No. 3	Trustmark Park • Pearl, MS	**W** 4–1	**Houston Harding (1–1)**	Drew Boyd (1–1)	**Stone Simmons (1)**		3,675	6–2	–
March 5	Tennessee Tech	No. 3	Dudy Noble Field • Starkville, MS	**canceled, COVID**							
March 5	Kent State	No. 3	Dudy Noble Field • Starkville, MS	**W** 8–3	**Brandon Smith (2–0)**	Collin Romel (0–2)	none	SECN+	2,923	7–2	–
March 6	Tennessee Tech	No. 3	Dudy Noble Field • Starkville, MS	**canceled, COVID**							
March 6	Kent State	No. 3	Dudy Noble Field • Starkville, MS	**L** 5–9	Luke Albright (2–1)	**Eric Cerantola (0–1)**	none	SECN+	3,557	7–3	–
March 7	Tennessee Tech	No. 3	Dudy Noble Field • Starkville, MS	**canceled, COVID**							
March 7	Kent State	No. 3	Dudy Noble Field • Starkville, MS	**W** 13–0	**Jackson Fristoe (1–0)**	Max Rippl (1–1)	none	SECN+	2,810	8–3	–
March 9	Grambling	No. 3	Dudy Noble Field • Starkville, MS	**W** 10–0	**Dylan Carmouche (1–0)**	Kerry Boykins Jr. (0–1)	none	SECN+	2,103	9–3	–
March 10	Louisiana	No. 3	Dudy Noble Field • Starkville, MS	**W** 4–0	**Houston Harding (2–1)**	Austin Perrin (0–1)	none	SECN+	2,976	10–3	–
March 12	Eastern Michigan	No. 3	Dudy Noble Field • Starkville, MS	**W** 14–0	**Christian MacLeod (1–1)**	Davis Feldman (2–1)	none	SECN+	3,526	11–3	–
March 13	Eastern Michigan	No. 3	Dudy Noble Field • Starkville, MS	**W** 4–1	**Carlisle Koestler (2–0)**	Justin Meis (0–2)	none	SECN+	3,956	12–3	–
March 14	Eastern Michigan	No. 3	Dudy Noble Field • Starkville, MS	**W** 4–1	**Jackson Fristoe (2–0)**	Luke McGuire (1–1)	**Landon Sims (1)**	SECN+	3,250	13–3	–
March 16	Samford	No. 3	Dudy Noble Field • Starkville, MS	**W** 10–2	**Brandon Smith (3–0)**	Blake Bortak (0–1)	none	SECN+	3,220	14–3	–
March 19	at No. 19 LSU	No. 3	Alex Box Stadium • Baton Rouge, LA	**W** 6–1	**Christian MacLeod (2–1)**	Jaden Hill (2–2)	**Brandon Smith (1)**	SECN	5,013	15–3	1–0
March 20	at No. 19 LSU	No. 3	Alex Box Stadium • Baton Rouge, LA	**W** 3–0	**Will Bednar (1–0)**	Landon Marceaux (2–1)	**Landon Sims (2)**	SECN+	5,031	16–3	2–0
March 21	at No. 19 LSU	No. 3	Alex Box Stadium • Baton Rouge, LA	**L** 3–8	AJ Labas (1–0)	**Jackson Fristoe (2–1)**	Devin Fontenot (2)	SECN+	4,603	16–4	2–1
March 23	North Alabama	No. 3	Dudy Noble Field • Starkville, MS	**postponed to 3/24, impending weather**							
March 24	North Alabama	No. 3	Dudy Noble Field • Starkville, MS	**W** 18–1	**Mikey Tepper (1–0)**	Will Haberstock (0–3)	none	SECN+	2,430	17–4	–
March 26	No. 2 Arkansas	No. 3	Dudy Noble Field • Starkville, MS	**L** 2–8	Patrick Wicklander (1–0)	**Christian MacLeod (2–2)**	Peyton Pallette (1)	SECN+	6,115	17–5	2–2
March 27	No. 2 Arkansas	No. 3	Dudy Noble Field • Starkville, MS	**L** 5–11	Caden Monke (3–0)	**Brandon Smith (3–1)**	Kevin Kopps (2)	SECN+	6,152	17–6	2–3
March 28	No. 2 Arkansas	No. 3	Dudy Noble Field • Starkville, MS	**L** 4–6	Ryan Costeiu (3–0)	**Jackson Fristoe (2–2)**	Jaxon Wiggins (4)	SECN	4,060	17–7	2–4
March 30	Mississippi Valley State	No. 8	Dudy Noble Field • Starkville, MS	**canceled, impending weather**							

April (13–3)
Date	Opponent	Rank	Site/stadium	Score	Win	Loss	Save	TV	Attendance	Overall record	SEC record
April 1	Kentucky	No. 8	Dudy Noble Field • Starkville, MS	**W** 8–1	**Christian MacLeod (3–2)**	Ryan Hagenow (1–1)	none	ESPNU	3,448	18–7	3–4
April 2	Kentucky	No. 8	Dudy Noble Field • Starkville, MS	**W** 3–2	**Landon Sims (2–0)**	Cole Stupp (3–1)	none	SECN	3,912	19–7	4–4
April 3	Kentucky	No. 8	Dudy Noble Field • Starkville, MS	**W** 4–3	**Jackson Fristoe (3–2)**	Zack Lee (2–2)	**Parker Stinnett (1)**	SECN+	4,159	20–7	5–4
April 6	Southern	No. 5	Dudy Noble Field • Starkville, MS	**W** 15–1	**Carlisle Koestler (3–0)**	Dillen Miller (0–1)	none	SECN+	2,292	21–7	–
April 9	at Auburn	No. 5	Plainsman Park • Auburn, AL	**W** 6–5	**Brandon Smith (4–1)**	Carson Skipper (0–1)	**Landon Sims (3)**	SECN+	850	22–7	6–4
April 10	at Auburn	No. 5	Plainsman Park • Auburn, AL	**W** 7–2	**Will Bednar (2–0)**	Jack Owen (0–2)	none	SECN+	1,267	23–7	7–4
April 11	at Auburn	No. 5	Plainsman Park • Auburn, AL	**W** 19–10	**Houston Harding (3–1)**	Joseph Gonzalez (0–3)	none	SECN	1,126	24–7	8–4
April 13	Arkansas State	No. 4	Dudy Noble Field • Starkville, MS	**W** 18–10	**Cade Smith (1–0)**	Jake Algee (0–1)	none	SECN+	2,447	25–7	–
Super Bulldog Weekend
April 16	No. 6 Ole Miss	No. 4	Dudy Noble Field • Starkville, MS	**W** 5–2	**Preston Johnson (1–0)**	Gunnar Hoglund (3–2)	**Landon Sims (4)**	SECN	10,291	26–7	9–4
April 17	No. 6 Ole Miss	No. 4	Dudy Noble Field • Starkville, MS	**L** 0–9	Doug Nikhazy (4–1)	**Will Bednar (2–1)**	none	SECN+	13,338	26–8	9–5
April 18	No. 6 Ole Miss	No. 4	Dudy Noble Field • Starkville, MS	**W** 7–5	**Houston Harding (4–1)**	Austin Miller (0–1)	**Landon Sims (5)**	SECN+	10,522	27–8	10–5
April 20	UAB	No. 4	Dudy Noble Field • Starkville, MS	**W** 19–7	**Mikey Tepper (2–0)**	Carson Knight (2–4)	none	SECN+	2,901	28–8	–
April 23	at No. 2 Vanderbilt	No. 4	Hawkins Field • Nashville, TN	**L** 2–6	Kumar Rocker (9–1)	**Christian MacLeod (3–3)**	none	SECN	1,407	28–9	10–6
April 24	at No. 2 Vanderbilt	No. 4	Hawkins Field • Nashville, TN	**W** 7–4	**Will Bednar (3–1)**	Jack Leiter (7–1)	none	ESPNU	1,399	29–9	11–6
April 25	at No. 2 Vanderbilt	No. 4	Hawkins Field • Nashville, TN	**L** 4–7	Chris McElvain (3–0)	**Jackson Fristoe (3–3)**	Nick Maldonado (3)	SECN+	1,372	29–10	11–7
April 30	Texas A&M	No. 6	Dudy Noble Field • Starkville, MS	**W** 8–7^{12}	**Landon Sims (3–0)**	Alex Magers (2–2)	none	SECN+	8,949	30–10	12–7

May (10–3)
Date	Opponent	Rank	Site/stadium	Score	Win	Loss	Save	TV	Attendance	Overall record	SEC record
May 1	Texas A&M (DH-1)	No. 6	Dudy Noble Field • Starkville, MS	**W** 3–2	**Will Bednar (4–1)**	Bryce Miller (2–2)	**Stone Simmons (2)**	SECN+	9,071	31–10	13–7
May 1	Texas A&M (DH-2)	No. 6	Dudy Noble Field • Starkville, MS	**W** 10–5	**Houston Harding (5–1)**	Nathan Dettmer (3–2)	**Cam Tullar (1)**	SECN+	7,938	32–10	14–7
May 2	Texas A&M	No. 6	Dudy Noble Field • Starkville, MS	**moved to 5/1, impending weather**							
May 5	at The Citadel	No. 4	Joseph P. Riley Jr. Park • Charleston, SC	**W** 10–2	**Cade Smith (2–0)**	Cameron Reeves (2–8)	none	ESPN+	1,173	33–10	–
May 7	at No. 19 South Carolina	No. 4	Founders Park • Columbia, SC	**W** 9–0	**Christian MacLeod (4–3)**	Brannon Jordan (4–4)	none	SECN+	3,017	34–10	15–7
May 8	at No. 19 South Carolina	No. 4	Founders Park • Columbia, SC	**W** 9–6	**Will Bednar (5–1)**	Will Sanders (6–3)	**Landon Sims (6)**	SECN+	3,350	35–10	16–7
May 9	at No. 19 South Carolina	No. 4	Founders Park • Columbia, SC	**L** 3–4^{11}	Julian Bosnic (3–2)	**Brandon Smith (4–2)**	none	SECN	2,810	35–11	16–8
May 11	UT Martin	No. 3	Dudy Noble Field • Starkville, MS	**canceled, impending weather**							
May 13	Missouri	No. 3	Dudy Noble Field • Starkville, MS	**W** 5–4	**Preston Johnson (2–0)**	Lukas Veinbergs (1–4)	**Landon Sims (7)**	ESPNU	7,444	36–11	17–8
May 14	Missouri	No. 3	Dudy Noble Field • Starkville, MS	**L** 6–7	Spencer Miles (2–7)	**Stone Simmons (1–1)**	none	SECN+	8,470	36–12	17–9
May 15	Missouri	No. 3	Dudy Noble Field • Starkville, MS	**L** 8–16	Ben Pedersen (1–1)	**Houston Harding (5–2)**	none	SECN+	8,730	36–13	17–10
May 18	Jacksonville State	No. 10	Dudy Noble Field • Starkville, MS	**W** 6–1^{5} ^{[2]}	**Parker Stinnett (1–0)**	Camden Lovrich (1–1)	none	SECN+	7,673	37–13	–
May 20	at Alabama	No. 10	Sewell–Thomas Stadium • Tuscaloosa, AL	**W** 4–2	**Christian MacLeod (5–3)**	Tyler Ras (6–4)	**Landon Sims (8)**	SECN+	2,032	38–13	18–10
May 21	at Alabama	No. 10	Sewell–Thomas Stadium • Tuscaloosa, AL	**W** 7–0	**Will Bednar (6–1)**	Dylan Smith (1–7)	none	SECN+	2,630	39–13	19–10
May 22	at Alabama	No. 10	Sewell–Thomas Stadium • Tuscaloosa, AL	**W** 7–3	**Houston Harding (6–2)**	Landon Green (3–1)	none	SECN+	2,630	40–13	20–10

Postseason (10–5)

SEC Tournament (0–2)
Date	Opponent	Seed/Rank	Site/stadium	Score	Win	Loss	Save	TV	Attendance	Overall record	SECT Record
May 26	vs. (6) No. 13 Florida	(3) No. 8	Hoover Metropolitan Stadium • Hoover, AL	**L** 1–13^{7}	Hunter Barco (10–2)	**Brandon Smith (4–3)**	none	SECN	5,235	40–14	0–1
May 27	vs. (2) No. 4 Tennessee	(3) No. 8	Hoover Metropolitan Stadium • Hoover, AL	**L** 2–12^{8}	Chad Dallas (10–1)	**Christian MacLeod (5–4)**	none	SECN	4,737	40–15	0–2

NCAA Starkville Regional (3–0)
Date	Opponent	Seed/Rank	Site/stadium	Score	Win	Loss	Save	TV	Attendance	Overall record	NCAAT record
June 4	(4) Samford	(1) No. 11	Dudy Noble Field • Starkville, MS	**W** 8–4	**Will Bednar (7–1)**	Samuel Strickland (5–4)	none	ESPN3	8,794	41–15	1–0
June 5	(2) VCU	(1) No. 11	Dudy Noble Field • Starkville, MS	**W** 16–4	**Christian MacLeod (6–4)**	Mason Delane (3–1)	none	ESPN3	10,011	42–15	2–0
June 6	(3) Campbell	(1) No. 11	Dudy Noble Field • Starkville, MS	**postponed to 6/7, inclement weather**							
June 7	(3) Campbell	(1) No. 11	Dudy Noble Field • Starkville, MS	**W** 6–5	**Houston Harding (7–2)**	Cade Boxrucker (0–2)	**Landon Sims (9)**	ESPNU	8,251	43–15	3–0

NCAA Starkville Super Regional (2–1)
Date	Opponent	Seed/Rank	Site/stadium	Score	Win	Loss	Save	TV	Attendance	Overall record	NCAAT record
June 12	(10) No. 6 Notre Dame	(7) No. 11	Dudy Noble Field • Starkville, MS	**W** 9–8	**Preston Johnson (3–0)**	Tanner Kohlhepp (7–2)	**Landon Sims (10)**	ESPN	14,385†	44–15	4–0
June 13	(10) No. 6 Notre Dame	(7) No. 11	Dudy Noble Field • Starkville, MS	**L** 1–9	Aidan Tyrell (5–1)	**Christian MacLeod (6–5)**	none	ESPNU	13,971	44–16	4–1
June 14	(10) No. 6 Notre Dame	(7) No. 11	Dudy Noble Field • Starkville, MS	**W** 11–7	**Landon Sims (4–0)**	Will Mercer (4–3)	none	ESPN2	11,754	45–16	5–1

College World Series (5–2)
Date	Opponent	Seed/Rank	Site/stadium	Score	Win	Loss	Save	TV	Attendance	Overall record	CWS record
June 20	vs. (2) No. 3 Texas	(7) No. 11	TD Ameritrade Park • Omaha, NE	**W** 2–1	**Will Bednar (8–1)**	Ty Madden (7–5)	**Landon Sims (11)**	ESPN2	23,885	46–16	1–0
June 22	vs. Virginia	(7) No. 11	TD Ameritrade Park • Omaha, NE	**W** 6–5	**Cade Smith (3–0)**	Stephen Schoch (4–2)	**Landon Sims (12)**	ESPN2	22,803	47–16	2–0
June 25	vs. (2) No. 3 Texas	(7) No. 11	TD Ameritrade Park • Omaha, NE	**L** 5–8	Aaron Nixon (4–3)	**Brandon Smith (4–4)**	none	ESPN	24,003	47–17	2–1
June 26	vs. (2) No. 3 Texas	(7) No. 11	TD Ameritrade Park • Omaha, NE	**W** 4–3	**Landon Sims (5–0)**	Cole Quintanilla (5–1)	none	ESPN2	21,883	48–17	3–1
June 28	vs. (4) No. 4 Vanderbilt	(7) No. 11	TD Ameritrade Park • Omaha, NE	**L** 2–8	Jack Leiter (11–4)	**Christian MacLeod (6–6)**	Nick Maldonado (9)	ESPN2	24,052	48–18	3–2
June 29	vs. (4) No. 4 Vanderbilt	(7) No. 11	TD Ameritrade Park • Omaha, NE	**W** 13–2	**Preston Johnson (4–0)**	Christian Little (3–2)	none	ESPN	24,122	49–18	4–2
June 30	vs. (4) No. 4 Vanderbilt	(7) No. 11	TD Ameritrade Park • Omaha, NE	**W** 9–0	**Will Bednar (9–1)**	Kumar Rocker (14–4)	**Landon Sims (13)**	ESPN2	24,052	50–18	5–2

Legend: = Win = Loss = Canceled
Bold = Mississippi State team member

1.^{1} ^{2} ^{3} State Farm College Baseball Showdown originally scheduled 2/19-21 was pushed back 1 day due to winter storms in Texas.
2.^{2} Game versus Jacksonville State was called after 5 innings due to inclement weather.
† Largest Super Regional Crowd in NCAA History

Schedule source:

*Rankings are based on the team's current ranking in the D1Baseball poll.

=== Starkville Regional ===
Starkville Regional Teams
(1) Mississippi State Bulldogs	(2) VCU Rams	(3) Campbell Fighting Camels	(4) Samford Bulldogs

First Round
1	**Mississippi State**	**8**
4	Samford	4
3	Campbell	4
2	**VCU**	**19**
Lower round 1
4	Samford	13
3	**Campbell**	**16**

Semi-Finals
1	**Mississippi State**	**16**
2	VCU	4
Lower final
3	**Campbell**	19
2	VCU	10

Finals
1	**Mississippi State**	**6**	–
3	Campbell	5	–

Starkville Regional Round 1
(4) Samford Bulldogs	vs.	(1) Mississippi State Bulldogs

June 4, 2021 2:06 pm (CDT) at Dudy Noble Field, Polk–DeMent Stadium in Starkville, Mississippi
Team	1	2	3	4	5	6	7	8	9	R	H	E
(4) Samford	1	0	0	0	2	0	0	1	0	**4**	**7**	**1**
**(1) Mississippi State**	1	3	0	1	0	1	2	0	X	**8**	**11**	**1**
WP: Will Bednar (7–1) LP: Samuel Strickland (5–4); Home runs: SAM: Max Pinto; Kaden Dreier; Sonny DiChiara; MSU: None; Attendance: 8,794

Starkville Regional Round 2
(2) VCU Rams	vs.	(1) Mississippi State Bulldogs

June 5, 2021 8:25 pm (CDT) at Dudy Noble Field, Polk–DeMent Stadium in Starkville, Mississippi
Team	1	2	3	4	5	6	7	8	9	R	H	E
(2) VCU	0	1	0	0	0	3	0	0	0	**4**	**8**	**3**
**(1) Mississippi State**	2	1	0	2	1	9	0	1	X	**16**	**14**	**0**
WP: Christian MacLeod (6–4) LP: Mason DeLane (3–1); Home runs: VCU: Jack Schroeder; Michael Haydak; MSU: Brad Cumbest; Kellum Clark; Kamren James; Attendance: 10,011

Starkville Regional Championship
(1) Mississippi State Bulldogs	vs.	(3) Campbell Fighting Camels

June 7, 2021 11:06 am (CDT) at Dudy Noble Field, Polk–DeMent Stadium in Starkville, Mississippi
Team	1	2	3	4	5	6	7	8	9	R	H	E
**(1) Mississippi State**	2	0	2	1	1	0	0	0	0	**6**	**10**	**0**
(3) Campbell	3	0	0	0	0	2	0	0	0	**5**	**7**	**2**
WP: Houston Harding (7–2) LP: Cade Boxrucker (0–2) Sv: Landon Sims (9); Home runs: MSU: Spencer Packard; CAMP: Kamren James; Logan Tanner; Attendance: 8,251

=== Starkville Super Regional ===
Starkville Super Regional Game 1
(10) Notre Dame Fighting Irish	vs.	(7) Mississippi State Bulldogs

June 12, 2021 1:06 pm (CDT) at Dudy Noble Field, Polk–DeMent Stadium in Starkville, Mississippi
Team	1	2	3	4	5	6	7	8	9	R	H	E
(10) Notre Dame	1	1	1	1	3	0	1	0	0	**8**	**12**	**4**
**(7) Mississippi State**	1	0	2	0	3	2	1	0	X	**9**	**10**	**1**
WP: Preston Johnson (3–0) LP: Tanner Kohlhepp (7–2) Sv: Landon Sims (10); Home runs: ND: Brooks Coetzee; Zack Prajzner; MSU: Tanner Allen (2); Rowdey Jordan; Attendance: 14,385

Starkville Super Regional Game 2
(7) Mississippi State Bulldogs	vs.	(10) Notre Dame Fighting Irish

June 13, 2021 5:05 pm (CDT) at Dudy Noble Field, Polk–DeMent Stadium in Starkville, Mississippi
Team	1	2	3	4	5	6	7	8	9	R	H	E
(7) Mississippi State	1	0	0	0	0	0	0	0	0	**1**	**5**	**2**
**(10) Notre Dame**	2	0	0	4	0	2	1	0	X	**9**	**8**	**1**
WP: Aidan Tyrell (5–1) LP: Christian MacLeod (6–5); Home runs: MSU: none ND: David LaManna; Jack Brannigan; Attendance: 13,971

Starkville Super Regional Game 3
(10) Notre Dame Fighting Irish	vs.	(7) Mississippi State Bulldogs

June 12, 2021 6:06 pm (CDT) at Dudy Noble Field, Polk–DeMent Stadium in Starkville, Mississippi
Team	1	2	3	4	5	6	7	8	9	R	H	E
(10) Notre Dame	1	0	1	0	3	0	2	0	0	**7**	**10**	**1**
**(7) Mississippi State**	1	6	1	2	1	0	0	0	X	**11**	**12**	**1**
WP: Landon Sims (4–0) LP: Will Mercer (4–3); Home runs: ND: Ryan Cole; Niko Kavadas; MSU: Logan Tanner; Tanner Allen; Attendance: 11,754

=== College World Series ===
2021 College World Series Teams
NC State Wolfpack	(9) Stanford Cardinal	(5) Arizona Wildcats	(4) Vanderbilt Commodores	Virginia Cavaliers	(3) Tennessee Volunteers	(7) Mississippi State Bulldogs	(2) Texas Longhorns

First round	Second round
**NC State**	**10**
9	Stanford	4
**NC State**	**1**
4	Vanderbilt	0
5	Arizona	6
4	**Vanderbilt**	**7**^{12}
Bracket 1
9	**Stanford**	**14**
5	Arizona	5
9	Stanford	5
4	**Vanderbilt**	**6**
3	Tennessee	0
**Virginia**	**6**
Virginia	5
7	**Mississippi State**	**6**
7	**Mississippi State**	**2**
2	Texas	1
Bracket 2
3	Tennessee	4
2	**Texas**	**8**
2	**Texas**	**6**
Virginia	2

Semifinals
NC State	1	–
4	**Vanderbilt**	**3**	– (Note: Game declared no contest due to COVID-19 protocols with NC State. Vanderbilt advanced in the tournament.)
7	**Mississippi State**	5	**4**
2	Texas	**8**	3

Finals
4	Vanderbilt	**8**	2	0
7	**Mississippi State**	2	**13**	**9**

== Record vs. conference opponents ==
Last two do not qualify for conf. tourn. Blank are not scheduled. Blue are home games, otherwise away.

2021 SEC baseball records Source: 2021 SEC baseball game results, 2021 SEC baseball schedule
Team	W–L	ALA	ARK	AUB	FLA	UGA	KEN	LSU	MSU	MIZZ	MISS	SCAR	TENN	TAMU	VAN	Team	Div	SR	SW
ALA	12–17		1–2	2–1	.	.	1–2	1–2	0–3	3–0	0–3	.	1–2	3–0	0–2	ALA	W5	3–7	2–2
ARK	22–8	2–1		2–1	3–0	2–1	.	2–1	3–0	.	2–1	2–1	2–1	2–1	.	ARK	W1	10–0	2–0
AUB	10–20	1–2	1–2		1–2	2–1	0–3	1–2	0–3	2–1	0–3	.	.	2–1	.	AUB	W6	3–7	0–3
FLA	17–13	.	0–3	2–1		2–1	2–1	.	.	3–0	2–1	0–3	1–2	3–0	2–1	FLA	E3	7–3	2–2
UGA	13–17	.	1–2	1–2	1–2		2–1	.	.	2–1	1–2	1–2	1–2	1–2	2–1	UGA	E5	3–7	0–0
KEN	12–18	2–1	.	3–0	1–2	1–2		1–2	0–3	2–1	.	0–3	1–2	.	1–2	KEN	E6	3–7	1–2
LSU	13–17	2–1	1–2	2–1	.	.	2–1		1–2	.	2–1	1–2	0–3	2–1	0–3	LSU	W4	5–5	0–2
MSU	20–10	3–0	0–3	3–0	.	.	3–0	2–1		1–2	2–1	2–1	.	3–0	1–2	MSU	W2	7–3	4–1
MIZZ	8–22	0–3	.	1–2	0–3	1–2	1–2	.	2–1		.	1–2	0–3	2–1	0–3	MIZZ	E7	2–8	0–4
MISS	18–12	3–0	1–2	3–0	1–2	2–1	.	1–2	1–2	.		3–0	.	1–2	2–1	MISS	W3	5–5	3–0
SCAR	16–14	.	1–2	.	3–0	2–1	3–0	2–1	1–2	2–1	0–3		1–2	.	1–2	SCAR	E4	5–5	2–1
TENN	20–10	2–1	1–2	.	2–1	2–1	2–1	3–0	.	3–0	.	2–1		2–1	1–2	TENN	E1	8–2	2–0
TAMU	9–21	0–3	1–2	1–2	0–3	2–1	.	1–2	0–3	1–2	2–1	.	1–2		.	TAMU	W7	2–8	0–3
VAN	19–10	2–0	.	.	1–2	1–2	2–1	3–0	2–1	3–0	1–2	2–1	2–1	.		VAN	E2	7–3	2–0
Team	W–L	ALA	ARK	AUB	FLA	UGA	KEN	LSU	MSU	MIZZ	MISS	SCAR	TENN	TAMU	VAN	Team	Div	SR	SW

Updated for entire regular season.

== Rankings ==
Ranking movements Legend: ██ Increase in ranking ██ Decrease in ranking т = Tied with team above or below
	Week																		
Poll	Pre	1	2	3	4	5	6	7	8	9	10	11	12	13	14	15	16	17	Final
Coaches'	7	7*	6	4	3	4	7	5	4	4	5	4	3	6	6	7т	7т*	7т*	1
Baseball America	8	8	2	2	2	2	5	4	3	2	4	4	3	6	6	8	8*	8*	1
Collegiate Baseball^	9	12	10	8	6	6	12	12	11	4	4	4	3	3	3	3	3	3	1
NCBWA†	7	6	5	4т	3	2	8	6	5	4	5	4	3	6	6	12	12*	12*	1
D1Baseball	7	5	3	3	3	3	8	5	4	4	6	4	3	10	8	11	11*	11*	1

^ Collegiate Baseball ranked 40 teams in their preseason poll, but only ranked 30 teams weekly during the season.
† NCBWA ranks 30 teams in their preseason poll, but only ranks 25 teams weekly during the season.
* A new poll was not released for this week, so for comparison purposes, the previous week's ranking is inserted in this week's slot.

== MLB draft ==
Player	Position	Round	Overall	MLB team
Will Bednar	RHP	1	14	San Francisco Giants
Tanner Allen†	OF	4	118	Miami Marlins
Eric Cerantola	RHP	5	139	Kansas City Royals
Christian McLeod	LHP	5	159	Minnesota Twins
Rowdey Jordan	OF	11	322	New York Mets

†Tanner Allen, a red shirt junior, was previously drafted in the 34th round in 2019.
NOTE: Houston Harding, a red shirt Junior LHP, signed a contract with the Los Angeles Angels as an undrafted free agent. All drafted have signed contracts.

== Player Eligibility ==
The following players have used up their eligibility and will not return for the next season: Scotty Dubrule 2nd, Carlisle Koestler RHP, and Riley Self RHP.

== High School Recruits ==
Before any draftees are signed by their major league team, Mississippi State was ranked 9th in the nation by Perfect Game. Perfect Game ranks players nationwide as the top 500. If there is no ranking, then the player was not in the top 500. If draft is not indicated, then the player was not drafted in this years draft. After all players, that were going to, have signed contracts with their major league team, this recruiting class is ranked 16th in the nation.

Player	Position	PGRnk	DftRd	DftOA	Draft MLB Team
Maddux Bruns	LHP	6	1	29	Los Angeles Dodgers
James Wood	OF	46	2	62	San Diego Padres
Jordan McCants	SS	113	3	88	Miami Marlins
Aaron Downs	3B	107	—	—	—
William "Pico" Kohn	LHP	148	—	—	—
Slate Alford	3B	224	—	—	—
Jack Walker	RHP	419	—	—	—
Revy "Trey" Higgins	OF	439	—	—	—
Gray Bane	C	—	—	—	—
Cole Cheatham	LHP	—	—	—	—
Jackson Conn	RHP	—	—	—	—
Tyler Haines	RHP	—	—	—	—
Hunter Hines	3B	—	—	—	—
Jeffrey Ince	SS	—	—	—	—
Tayler Montiel	LHP	—	—	—	—
Sawyer Robertson	OF	—	—	—	—
Bradley Wilson	C	—	—	—	—
Bryce Chance	OF	—	—	—	—

NOTE: All drafted have signed contracts.
