= 2021 Tennessee Volunteers baseball team =

American college baseball season

2021 Tennessee Volunteers baseball

SEC Eastern Division champion NCAA Knoxville Regional champion Knoxville Super Regional champion

College World Series, 0–2
- Conference: Southeastern Conference
- Eastern Division

Ranking
- Coaches: No. 5
- CB: No. 7
- Record: 50–18 (20–10 SEC)
- Head coach: Tony Vitello (4th season)
- Assistant coaches: Frank Anderson; Josh Elander
- Home stadium: Lindsey Nelson Stadium

Uniform
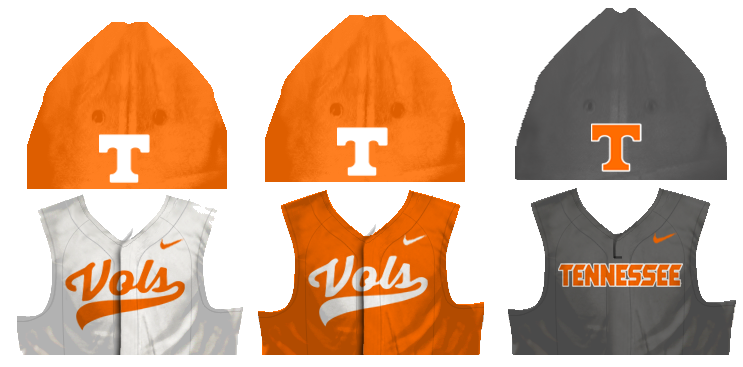

2021 Southeastern Conference baseball standings
	Conf.				Overall
Team	W		L	PCT	W		L	PCT
Eastern
No. 6 Tennessee ^{x}‍‍‍^{y}	20	–	10	.667	50	–	18	.735
No. 2 Vanderbilt ‍‍‍^{y}	19	–	10	.655	49	–	18	.731
Florida ‍‍‍^{y}	17	–	13	.567	38	–	22	.633
South Carolina ‍‍‍^{y}	16	–	14	.533	34	–	23	.596
Georgia ‍‍‍	13	–	17	.433	31	–	25	.554
Kentucky ‍‍‍	12	–	18	.400	29	–	23	.558
Missouri ‍‍‍	8	–	22	.267	15	–	36	.294
Western
No. 5 Arkansas ^{x}‍†‍‡‍^{y}	22	–	8	.733	50	–	13	.794
No. 1 Mississippi State ‍‍‍^{y}	20	–	10	.667	50	–	18	.735
No. 13 Ole Miss ‍‍‍^{y}	18	–	12	.600	45	–	22	.672
No. 18 LSU ‍‍‍^{y}	13	–	17	.433	38	–	25	.603
Alabama ‍‍‍^{y}	12	–	17	.414	32	–	26	.552
Auburn ‍‍‍	10	–	20	.333	25	–	27	.481
Texas A&M ‍‍‍	9	–	21	.300	29	–	27	.518
x – Division champion † – Conference champion ‡ – Tournament champion y – Invited to the NCAA tournament As of June 30, 2021; Rankings from D1Baseball

The 2021 Tennessee Volunteers baseball team represented the University of Tennessee during the 2021 NCAA Division I baseball season. Tennessee competed in the Eastern Division of the Southeastern Conference (SEC). The Volunteers play their home games at Lindsey Nelson Stadium. Coach Tony Vitello lead the Volunteers in his 4th season with the program.

Tennessee reached the College World Series for the first time since 2005, but were eliminated in two games. The Volunteers finished the season with a 50–18 record.

== Previous season ==
The 2020 Tennessee Volunteers baseball team notched a 15–2 (0–0) regular season record. The season prematurely ended on March 12, 2020, due to concerns over the COVID-19 pandemic.

== Personnel ==
=== Roster ===
2021 Tennessee Volunteers roster
Pitchers: 11 – Will Heflin – Senior; 15 – Shawn Scott – Freshman; 16 – Camden Sewell – Junior; 20 – Connor Housley – Sophomore; 25 – Christian Delashmit – Sophomore; 26 – Jason Rackers – Junior; 28 – Elijah Pleasants – Junior; 29 – Blade Tidwell – Freshman; 31 – Jackson Leath – Senior; 32 – Sean Hunley – Senior; 33 – Mark McLaughlin – Sophomore; 34 – Hollis Fanning – Freshman; 35 – Kirby Connell – Sophomore; 36 – Chad Dallas – Junior; 41 – Will Mabrey – Sophomore; 42 – Jake Fitzgibbons – Freshman; 44 – Charez Butcher – Freshman; 46 – Redmond Walsh – (redshirt) Senior; 47 – Cade Elliott – Freshman; 48 – Zander Sechrist – Freshman; 49 – Colin Ahearn – Freshman; 50 – Ben Joyce – Sophomore; 52 – Drew Patterson – Freshman	Catchers: 14 – Charlie Taylor – Freshman; 17 – Connor Pavolonyr – Junior; 19 – Jackson Greer – Senior; Infielders: 4 – Liam Spence – Senior; 5 – Logan Steenstra – Sophomore; 7 – Jake Rucker – Junior; 9 – Jorel Ortega – Sophomore; 13 – Cortland Lawson – Sophomore; 40 – Luc Lipcius – (redshirt) Junior; 51 – Austen Jaslove – Freshman	Outfielders: 6 – Evan Russell – Senior; 8 – Christian Scott – Junior; 12 – Kyle Booker – Freshman; 18 – Hunter Ensley – Freshman; 27 – Jordan Beck – Sophomore; 43 – Reed Metz – Freshman; 45 – Jared Dickey – Freshman; Utility: 1 – Drew Gilbert (OF/LHP) – Sophomore; 2 – Max Ferguson (INF/OF) – Junior; 10 – Pete Derkay (UTL) – Senior; 21 – Trey Lipscomb (INF/OF) – Junior; 30 – Ethan Payne (INF/OF) – Sophomore; 37 – Brock Lucas (INF/RHP) – Freshman

=== Coaching staff ===
2021 Tennessee Volunteers coaching staff
Name	Position	Seasons at Tennessee
Tony Vitello	Head coach	4
Frank Anderson	Assistant Coach/Pitching	4
Josh Elander	Assistant Coach/Recruiting Coordinator	4
Ross Kivett	Volunteer Assistant Coach/Camp Coordinator	4
Richard Jackson	Student Assistant Pitching Coach	2
Quentin Eberhardt	Director of Baseball Sports Performance	4

== Game log ==
2021 Tennessee Volunteers baseball game log (50–18)
Legend: = Win = Loss = Canceled Bold = Tennessee team member
Regular season (42–14)

February (7–2)
Date	Time (ET)	TV	Opponent	Rank	Stadium	Score	Win	Loss	Save	Attendance	Overall	SEC	Sources
February 19	7:00 p.m.	ESPN+	at Georgia Southern*	No. 19	J. I. Clements Stadium; Statesboro, Georgia	**W** 5–3	**Dallas (1–0)**	Jackson (0–1)	**Walsh (1)**	704	1–0	—	Box Score; Recap
February 20	2:00 p.m.	ESPN+	at Georgia Southern*	No. 19	J. I. Clements Stadium	**W** 5–3	**Walsh (1–0)**	Harris (0–1)	—	767	2–0	—	Box Score; Recap
February 21	1:00 p.m.	ESPN+	at Georgia Southern*	No. 19	J. I. Clements Stadium	**W** 7–3 ^{(12)}	**Hunley (1–0)**	Paden (0–1)	—	709	3–0	—	Box Score; Recap
February 23	4:30 p.m.	WatchESPN	Arkansas–Pine Bluff*	No. 18	Lindsey Nelson Stadium; Knoxville, Tennessee	**W** 21–1	**Heflin (1–0)**	Barker (0–1)	—	918	4–0	—	Box Score; Recap
February 24	4:30 p.m.	WatchESPN	Arkansas–Pine Bluff*	No. 18	Lindsey Nelson Stadium	**W** 14–6	**Gilbert (1–0)**	Jones (0–1)	—	914	5–0	—	Box Score; Recap
February 26	4:30 p.m.	WatchESPN	Indiana State*	No. 18	Lindsey Nelson Stadium	**W** 4–3	**Hunley (2–0)**	Buraconak (0–1)	—	852	6–0	—	Box Score; Recap
February 27	12:30 p.m.	WatchESPN	Indiana State*	No. 18	Lindsey Nelson Stadium	**L** 1–3	Cline (1–0)	**Tidwell (0–1)**	Grauer (1)	927	6–1	—	Box Score; Recap
February 27	4:15 p.m.	WatchESPN	Indiana State*	No. 18	Lindsey Nelson Stadium	**L** 5–7	Fenlong (1–0)	**Pleasants (0–1)**	Grauer (2)	927	6–2	—	Box Score; Recap
February 28	1:00 p.m.	WatchESPN	Indiana State*	No. 18	Lindsey Nelson Stadium	**W** 6–5 ^{(11)}	**Walsh (2–0)**	Hurth (0–1)	—	903	7–2	—	Box Score; Recap

March (15–2)
Date	Time (ET)	TV	Opponent	Rank	Stadium	Score	Win	Loss	Save	Attendance	Overall	SEC	Sources
March 3	5:30 p.m.	ESPN+	at Austin Peay*	No. 18	Raymond C. Hand Park; Clarksville, Tennessee	**W** 5–3	**Pleasants (1–1)**	Magrann (0–1)	—	537	8–2	—	Box Score; Recap
March 3	6:00 p.m.	WatchESPN	Dayton*	No. 18	Lindsey Nelson Stadium	Cancelled (COVID-19 protocols)						—	Recap
March 5	5:30 p.m.	SECN+	Georgia State*	No. 18	Lindsey Nelson Stadium	**W** 6–1	**Heflin (2–0)**	Watson (1–1)	—	958	9–2	—	Box Score; Recap
March 6	3:00 p.m.	SECN+	Georgia State*	No. 18	Lindsey Nelson Stadium	**W** 5–1	**Tidwell (1–1)**	Jones (0–1)	**Walsh (2)**	1,025	10–2	—	Box Score; Recap
March 7	1:00 p.m.	SECN+	Georgia State*	No. 18	Lindsey Nelson Stadium	**W** 7–0	**Pleasants (2–1)**	Treadway (0–2)	—	988	11–2	—	Box Score; Recap
March 9	4:00 p.m.	CUSA.tv	at Charlotte*	No. 14	Hayes Stadium; Charlotte, North Carolina	**L** 0–9	Marozas (1–0)	**Heflin (2–1)**	—	145	11–3	—	Box Score; Recap
March 12	6:30 p.m.	SECN+	UNCG*	No. 14	Lindsey Nelson Stadium	**W** 6–2	**Dallas (2–0)**	Koehn (1–1)	**Walsh (3)**	876	12–3	—	Box Score; Recap
March 13	6:00 p.m.	SECN+	UNCG*	No. 14	Lindsey Nelson Stadium	**W** 14–9	**McLaughlin (1–0)**	King (0–1)	—	1,007	13–3	—	Box Score; Recap
March 14	1:00 p.m.	SECN+	UNCG*	No. 14	Lindsey Nelson Stadium	**W** 9–3	**Tidwell (2–1)**	Mathewson (2–2)	**Hunley (1)**	999	14–3	—	Box Score; Recap
March 16	6:30 p.m.	WatchESPN	ETSU*	No. 10	Lindsey Nelson Stadium	**W** 9–6 ^{(10)}	**Connell (1–0)**	Mercer (0–2)	—	1,019	15–3	—	Box Score; Recap
March 19	6:00 p.m.	SECN+	at No. 7 Georgia; Rivalry	No. 10	Foley Field; Athens, Georgia	**W** 11–6	**Dallas (3–0)**	Wagner (3–1)	—	664	16–3	1–0	Box Score; Recap
March 20	1:00 p.m.	SECN+	at No. 7 Georgia; Rivalry	No. 10	Foley Field	**L** 4–5	Harris (2–0)	**Walsh (2–1)**	—	664	16–4	1–1	Box Score; Recap
March 21	1:00 p.m.	SECN+	at No. 7 Georgia; Rivalry	No. 10	Foley Field	**W** 4–1	**Tidwell (3–1)**	Cannon (1–1)	**Sewell (1)**	664	17–4	2–1	Box Score; Recap
March 23	6:30 p.m.	SECN+	Eastern Kentucky*	No. 9	Lindsey Nelson Stadium	**W** 13–5	**Sechrist (1–0)**	Kelly (1–2)	—	1,055	18–4	—	Box Score; Recap
March 26	6:30 p.m.	SECN+	No. 14 LSU	No. 9	Lindsey Nelson Stadium	**W** 3–1	**Dallas (4–0)**	Marceaux (2–2)	**Hunley (2)**	1,384	19–4	3–1	Box Score; Recap
March 27	6:00 p.m.	SECN+	No. 14 LSU	No. 9	Lindsey Nelson Stadium	**W** 9–8 ^{(11)}	**Hunley (3–0)**	Fontenot (1–1)	—	1,067	20–4	4–1	Box Score; Recap
March 28	1:00 p.m.	SECN+	No. 14 LSU	No. 9	Lindsey Nelson Stadium	**W** 3–2 ^{(8)}	**Hunley (4–0)**	Edwards (0–1)	—	1,238	21–4	5–1	Box Score; Recap
March 30	6:30 p.m.	WatchESPN	Western Carolina*	No. 6	Lindsey Nelson Stadium	**W** 9–2	**Fitzgibbons (1–0)**	Wallington (0–1)	—	1,218	22–4	—	Box Score; Recap

April (11–7)
Date	Time (ET)	TV	Opponent	Rank	Stadium	Score	Win	Loss	Save	Attendance	Overall	SEC	Sources
April 2	7:00 p.m.	SECN+	at Alabama; Rivalry	No. 6	Sewell–Thomas Stadium; Tuscaloosa, Alabama	**L** 4–7	Ras (4–1)	**Hunley (4–1)**	Lee (2)	1,764	22–5	5–2	Box Score; Recap
April 3	7:00 p.m.	SECN	at Alabama; Rivalry	No. 6	Sewell–Thomas Stadium	**W** 8–4 ^{(11)}	**Sewell (1–0)**	Hitt (1–2)	—	1,764	23–5	6–2	Box Score; Recap
April 4	12:00 p.m.	SECN	at Alabama; Rivalry	No. 6	Sewell–Thomas Stadium	**W** 9–8	**Tidwell (4–1)**	Shamblin (2–2)	**Hunley (3)**	1,764	24–5	7–2	Box Score; Recap
April 6	6:30 p.m.	SECN+	Eastern Kentucky*	No. 6	Lindsey Nelson Stadium	**W** 10–1	**Rackers (1–0)**	Simpson (0–3)	—	1,367	25–5	—	Box Score; Recap
April 9	6:30 p.m.	SECN+	No. 9 Florida; Rivalry	No. 6	Lindsey Nelson Stadium	**W** 6–4	**Dallas (5–0)**	Scott (0–2)	**Hunley (4)**	1,477	26–5	8–2	Box Score; Recap
April 10	7:00 p.m.	SECN	No. 9 Florida; Rivalry	No. 6	Lindsey Nelson Stadium	**W** 5–4	**McLaughlin (2–0)**	Van Der Weide (0–1)	**Connell (1)**	1,430	27–5	9–2	Box Score; Recap
April 11	1:00 p.m.	SECN+	No. 9 Florida; Rivalry	No. 6	Lindsey Nelson Stadium	**L** 6–7	Scott (1–2)	**Hunley (4–2)**	—	1,537	27–6	9–3	Box Score; Recap
April 13	5:00 p.m.	ESPN+	at Western Carolina*	No. 5	Hennon Stadium; Cullowhee, North Carolina	**W** 14–12	**Walsh (3–1)**	Bright (0–1)	**Connell (2)**	115	28–6	—	Box Score; Recap
April 16	7:00 p.m.	ESPNU	No. 2 Vanderbilt; Rivalry	No. 5	Lindsey Nelson Stadium	**L** 0–5	Rocker (8–1)	**Dallas (5–1)**	—	2,390	28–7	9–4	Box Score; Recap
April 17	4:00 p.m.	SECN	No. 2 Vanderbilt; Rivalry	No. 5	Lindsey Nelson Stadium	**W** 8–4	**Hunley (5–2)**	Murphy (0–1)	—	2,263	29–7	10–4	Box Score; Recap
April 18	1:00 p.m.	SECN+	No. 2 Vanderbilt; Rivalry	No. 5	Lindsey Nelson Stadium	**L** 4–10	McElvain (2–0)	**Tidwell (4–2)**	—	2,450	29–8	10–5	Box Score; Recap
April 20	6:00 p.m.	WatchESPN	Tennessee Tech*	No. 6	Lindsey Nelson Stadium	**W** 3–2	**Hunley (6–2)**	Holley (1–1)	—	1,463	30–8	—	Box Score; Recap
April 24	3:00 p.m.	SECN+	at Texas A&M	No. 6	Blue Bell Park; College Station, Texas	**W** 6–1	**Dallas (6–1)**	Saenz (5–5)	—	2,504	31–8	11–5	Box Score; Recap
April 24	6:00 p.m.	SECN+	at Texas A&M	No. 6	Blue Bell Park	**L** 5–6	Ornelas (3–0)	**Connell (1–1)**	Jozwiak (6)	2,504	31–9	11–6	Box Score; Recap
April 25	2:00 p.m.	SECN+	at Texas A&M	No. 6	Blue Bell Park	**W** 20–7	**Hunley (7–2)**	Menefee (2–2)	**Walsh (4)**	1,634	32–9	12–6	Box Score; Recap
April 27	6:30 p.m.	SECN+	Lipscomb*	No. 4	Lindsey Nelson Stadium	**L** 1–4	Williams (1–2)	**Rackers (1–1)**	Drabick (1)	1,703	32–10	—	Box Score; Recap
April 29	7:30 p.m.	ESPNU	Kentucky; Rivalry	No. 4	Lindsey Nelson Stadium	**W** 14–4	**Dallas (7–1)**	Stupp (4–4)	—	1,511	33–10	13–6	Box Score; Recap
April 30	6:30 p.m.	SECN+	Kentucky; Rivalry	No. 4	Lindsey Nelson Stadium	**L** 2–8	Degen (2–0)	**Heflin (2–2)**	—	2,400	33–11	13–7	Box Score; Recap

May (10–3)
Date	Time (ET)	TV	Opponent	Rank	Stadium	Score	Win	Loss	Save	Attendance	Overall	SEC	Sources
May 1	1:00 p.m.	SECN+	Kentucky; Rivalry	No. 4	Lindsey Nelson Stadium	**W** 11–2	**Tidwell (5–2)**	Lee (4–4)	**Walsh (5)**	2,101	34–11	14–7	Box Score; Recap
May 7	7:30 p.m.	SECN+	at Missouri	No. 5	Taylor Stadium; Columbia, Missouri	**W** 5–4	**Dallas (8–1)**	Kush (2–2)	**Hunley (5)**	600	35–11	15–7	Box Score; Recap
May 8	4:00 p.m.	SECN	at Missouri	No. 5	Taylor Stadium	**W** 11–4	**Sewell (2–0)**	Ash (1–3)	—	600	36–11	16–7	Box Score; Recap
May 9	2:00 p.m.	SECN+	at Missouri	No. 5	Taylor Stadium	**W** 10–2	**Tidwell (6–2)**	Hise (0–7)	—	600	37–11	17–7	Box Score; Recap
May 11	6:30 p.m.	WatchESPN	Tennessee Tech*	No. 4	Lindsey Nelson Stadium	**W** 10–8	**Sechrist (2–0)**	Medrano (0–1)	—	1,735	38–11	—	Box Score; Recap
May 14	6:30 p.m.	SECN+	No. 1 Arkansas	No. 4	Lindsey Nelson Stadium	**L** 5–6	Kopps (8–0)	Hunley (7–3)	—	3,476	38–12	17–8	Box Score; Recap
May 15	12:00 p.m.	SECN	No. 1 Arkansas	No. 4	Lindsey Nelson Stadium	**W** 8–7	**Walsh (4–1)**	Wiggins (3–1)	—	3,101	39–12	18–8	Box Score; Recap
May 16	1:00 p.m.	SECN+	No. 1 Arkansas	No. 4	Lindsey Nelson Stadium	**L** 2–3	Kopps (9–0)	Tidwell (6–3)	—	3,575	39–13	18–9	Box Score; Recap
May 18	6:30 p.m.	WatchESPN	Belmont*	No. 4	Lindsey Nelson Stadium	**W** 11–2	**Sewell (3–0)**	Jenkins (1–1)	—	2,578	40–13	—	Box Score; Recap
May 20	7:30 p.m.	SECN+	at No. 21 South Carolina	No. 4	Founders Park; Columbia, South Carolina	**W** 10–4	**Dallas (9–1)**	Jordan (5–5)	**Hunley (6)**	4,015	41–13	19–9	Box Score; Recap
May 21	4:00 p.m.	SECN+	at No. 21 South Carolina	No. 4	Founders Park	**L** 2–3	Kerry (5–1)	**Sewell (3–1)**	Bosnic (4)	5,712	41–14	19–10	Box Score; Recap
May 22	2:00 p.m.	SECN+	at No. 21 South Carolina	No. 4	Founders Park	**W** 5–4	**Tidwell (7–3)**	Farr (3–6)	**Hunley (7)**	5,028	42–14	20–10	Box Score; Recap

Postseason (8–4)

SEC Tournament (3–2)
Date	Time (ET)	TV	Opponent	Rank	Stadium	Score	Win	Loss	Save	Attendance	Overall	SECT	Sources
May 26	1:00 p.m.	SECN	vs. (10) Alabama; Second Round	(2) No. 4	Hoover Metropolitan Stadium; Hoover, Alabama	**L** 2–3 ^{(11)}	Lee (7–0)	**Hunley (7–4)**	—	5,235	42–15	0–1	Box Score; Recap
May 27	10:30 a.m.	SECN	vs. (3) No. 8 Mississippi State; Losers Second Round	(2) No. 4	Hoover Metropolitan Stadium	**W** 12–2 ^{(8)}	**Dallas (10–1)**	MacLeod (5–4)	—	4,737	43–15	1–1	Box Score; Recap
May 28	11:00 a.m.	SECN	vs. (10) Alabama; Losers Third round	(2) No. 4	Hoover Metropolitan Stadium	**W** 11–0 ^{(7)}	**Tidwell (8–3)**	Green (3–2)	—	5,901	44–15	2–1	Box Score; Recap
May 29	1:00 p.m.	SECN	vs. (6) No. 13 Florida; Semifinals	(2) No. 4	Hoover Metropolitan Stadium	**W** 4–0	**Sewell (4–1)**	Sproat (2–1)	—	8,735	45–15	3–1	Box Score; Recap
May 30	2:05 p.m.	ESPN2	vs. (1) No. 1 Arkansas; Final	(2) No. 4	Hoover Metropolitan Stadium	**L** 2–7	Costeiu (8–2)	**Heflin (2–3)**	Kopps (10)	10,176	45–16	3–2	Box Score; Recap

NCAA Knoxville Regional (3–0)
Date	Time (ET)	TV	Opponent	Rank	Stadium	Score	Win	Loss	Save	Attendance	Overall	NCAAT	Sources
June 4	6:00 p.m.	ESPN3	(4) Wright State; Regional First round	(1) No. 2	Lindsey Nelson Stadium	**W** 9–8	**Walsh (5–1)**	Cline (8–2)	—	3,951	46–16	1–0	Box Score; Recap
June 5	6:00 p.m.	ESPN3	(3) Liberty; Regional semifinal	(1) No. 2	Lindsey Nelson Stadium	**W** 9–3	**Tidwell (9–3)**	Cumming (4–3)	**Sewell (2)**	4,006	47–16	2–0	Box Score; Recap
June 6	6:45 p.m.	ESPN3	(3) Liberty; Regional final – Game 1	(1) No. 2	Lindsey Nelson Stadium	**W** 3–1	**Heflin (3–3)**	Ellard (0–1)	**Hunley (8)**	3,941	48–16	3–0	Box Score; Recap

NCAA Knoxville Super Regional (2–0)
Date	Time (ET)	TV	Opponent	Rank	Stadium	Score	Win	Loss	Save	Attendance	Overall	NCAAT	Sources
June 12	7:00 p.m.	ESPN2	No. 21 LSU; Super Regional – Game 1	(3) No. 2	Lindsey Nelson Stadium	**W** 4–2	**Dallas (11–1)**	Coleman (3–2)	**Hunley (9)**	4,283	49–16	4–0	Box Score; Recap
June 13	12:00 p.m.	ESPNU	No. 21 LSU; Super Regional – Game 2	(3) No. 2	Lindsey Nelson Stadium	**W** 15–6	**Tidwell (10–3)**	Marceaux (7–7)	—	4,283	50–16	5–0	Box Score; Recap

NCAA College World Series (0–2)
Date	Time (ET)	TV	Opponent	Rank	Stadium	Score	Win	Loss	Save	Attendance	Overall	NCAAT	Sources
June 20	2:00 p.m.	ESPN2	vs. No. 9 Virginia; College World Series – Game 3	(3) No. 2	TD Ameritrade Park Omaha; Omaha, Nebraska	**L** 0–6	Abbott (9–6)	**Dallas (11–2)**	Wyatt (1)	22,130	50–17	5–1	Box Score; Recap
June 22	2:00 p.m.	ESPNU	vs. (2) No. 3 Texas; College World Series – Game 7	(3) No. 8	TD Ameritrade Park Omaha	**L** 4–8	Witt (5–0)	**Hunley (7–5)**	—	19,150	50–18	5–2	Box Score; Recap

*Denotes non–conference game • Schedule source • Rankings based on the teams' current ranking in the ESPN/USA Today Coaches Poll • (#) Tournament seedings in parentheses.

== Knoxville Regional ==
Knoxville Regional Teams
(1) Tennessee Volunteers	(2) Duke Blue Devils	(3) Liberty Flames	(4) Wright State Raiders

First round
1	Tennessee	9
4	Wright State	8
3	Liberty	11
2	Duke	6
Lower round 1
4	Wright State	6
2	Duke	14

Semi-Finals
1	Tennessee	9
3	Liberty	3
Lower final
2	Duke	4
3	Liberty	15

Finals
1	Tennessee	3	–
3	Liberty	1	–

== College World Series ==
2021 College World Series Teams
NC State Wolfpack	(9) Stanford Cardinal	(5) Arizona Wildcats	(4) Vanderbilt Commodores	Virginia Cavaliers	(3) Tennessee Volunteers	(7) Mississippi State Bulldogs	(2) Texas Longhorns

First round	Second round
NC State	10
9	Stanford	4
NC State	1
4	Vanderbilt	0
5	Arizona	6
4	Vanderbilt	7^{12}
Bracket 1
9	Stanford	14
5	Arizona	5
9	Stanford	5
4	Vanderbilt	6
3	Tennessee	0
Virginia	6
Virginia	5
7	Mississippi State	6
7	Mississippi State	2
2	Texas	1
Bracket 2
3	Tennessee	4
2	Texas	8
2	Texas	6
Virginia	2

Semifinals
NC State	1	–
4	Vanderbilt	3	– (Note: Game declared no contest due to COVID-19 protocols with NC State. Vanderbilt advanced in the tournament.)
7	Mississippi State	5	4
2	Texas	8	3

Finals
4	Vanderbilt	8	2	0
7	Mississippi State	2	13	9

== Rankings ==
Ranking movements Legend: ██ Increase in ranking ██ Decrease in ranking
	Week																		
Poll	Pre	1	2	3	4	5	6	7	8	9	10	11	12	13	14	15	16	17	Final
Coaches'	16	16*	17	14	10	9	6	4	3	5	4	6	5	4	4	2	2	2	5
Baseball America	19	17	22	23	18	16	10	7	5	7	7	7	5	5	5	3	3	3	8
Collegiate Baseball^	35	27	29	28	29	28	7	4	4	6	6	6	6	6	5	5	5	4	7
NCBWA†	20	15	18	15	15	10	7	4	4	5	4	4	5	5	4	3	4	4	8
D1Baseball	19	18	18	15	13	12	9	6	5	6	4	4	4	4	4	2	2	2	6

^ Collegiate Baseball ranked 40 teams in their preseason poll, but only ranked 30 teams weekly during the season.
† NCBWA ranks 30 teams in their preseason poll, but only ranks 25 teams weekly during the season.
* A new poll was not released for this week, so for comparison purposes, the previous week's ranking is inserted in this week's slot.

== Record vs. conference opponents ==
Last two do not qualify for conf. tourn. Blank are not scheduled. Blue are home games, otherwise away.

2021 SEC baseball records Source: 2021 SEC baseball game results, 2021 SEC baseball schedule
Team	W–L	ALA	ARK	AUB	FLA	UGA	KEN	LSU	MSU	MIZZ	MISS	SCAR	TENN	TAMU	VAN	Team	Div	SR	SW
ALA	12–17		1–2	2–1	.	.	1–2	1–2	0–3	3–0	0–3	.	1–2	3–0	0–2	ALA	W5	3–7	2–2
ARK	22–8	2–1		2–1	3–0	2–1	.	2–1	3–0	.	2–1	2–1	2–1	2–1	.	ARK	W1	10–0	2–0
AUB	10–20	1–2	1–2		1–2	2–1	0–3	1–2	0–3	2–1	0–3	.	.	2–1	.	AUB	W6	3–7	0–3
FLA	17–13	.	0–3	2–1		2–1	2–1	.	.	3–0	2–1	0–3	1–2	3–0	2–1	FLA	E3	7–3	2–2
UGA	13–17	.	1–2	1–2	1–2		2–1	.	.	2–1	1–2	1–2	1–2	1–2	2–1	UGA	E5	3–7	0–0
KEN	12–18	2–1	.	3–0	1–2	1–2		1–2	0–3	2–1	.	0–3	1–2	.	1–2	KEN	E6	3–7	1–2
LSU	13–17	2–1	1–2	2–1	.	.	2–1		1–2	.	2–1	1–2	0–3	2–1	0–3	LSU	W4	5–5	0–2
MSU	20–10	3–0	0–3	3–0	.	.	3–0	2–1		1–2	2–1	2–1	.	3–0	1–2	MSU	W2	7–3	4–1
MIZZ	8–22	0–3	.	1–2	0–3	1–2	1–2	.	2–1		.	1–2	0–3	2–1	0–3	MIZZ	E7	2–8	0–4
MISS	18–12	3–0	1–2	3–0	1–2	2–1	.	1–2	1–2	.		3–0	.	1–2	2–1	MISS	W3	5–5	3–0
SCAR	16–14	.	1–2	.	3–0	2–1	3–0	2–1	1–2	2–1	0–3		1–2	.	1–2	SCAR	E4	5–5	2–1
TENN	20–10	2–1	1–2	.	2–1	2–1	2–1	3–0	.	3–0	.	2–1		2–1	1–2	TENN	E1	8–2	2–0
TAMU	9–21	0–3	1–2	1–2	0–3	2–1	.	1–2	0–3	1–2	2–1	.	1–2		.	TAMU	W7	2–8	0–3
VAN	19–10	2–0	.	.	1–2	1–2	2–1	3–0	2–1	3–0	1–2	2–1	2–1	.		VAN	E2	7–3	2–0
Team	W–L	ALA	ARK	AUB	FLA	UGA	KEN	LSU	MSU	MIZZ	MISS	SCAR	TENN	TAMU	VAN	Team	Div	SR	SW

Updated for entire regular season.

== 2021 MLB draft ==
Player	Position	Round	Overall	MLB team
Chad Dallas	RHP	4	121	Toronto Blue Jays
Liam Spence	SS	5	154	Chicago Cubs
Max Ferguson	2B	5	160	San Diego Padres
Connor Pavolony	C	7	197	Baltimore Orioles
Jake Rucker	3B	7	219	Minnesota Twins
Jackson Leath	RHP	12	344	Texas Rangers
Sean Hunley	RHP	19	581	Tampa Bay Rays
