= 2021 South Carolina Gamecocks baseball team =

American college baseball season

2021 South Carolina Gamecocks baseball

Columbia Regional, 1–2
- Conference: Southeastern Conference
- Eastern Division
- Record: 34–23 (16–14 SEC)
- Head coach: Mark Kingston (4th season)
- Assistant coaches: Trip Couch (4th season); Stuart Lake (5th season)
- Pitching coach: Skylar Meade (4th season)
- Home stadium: Founders Park

Uniform
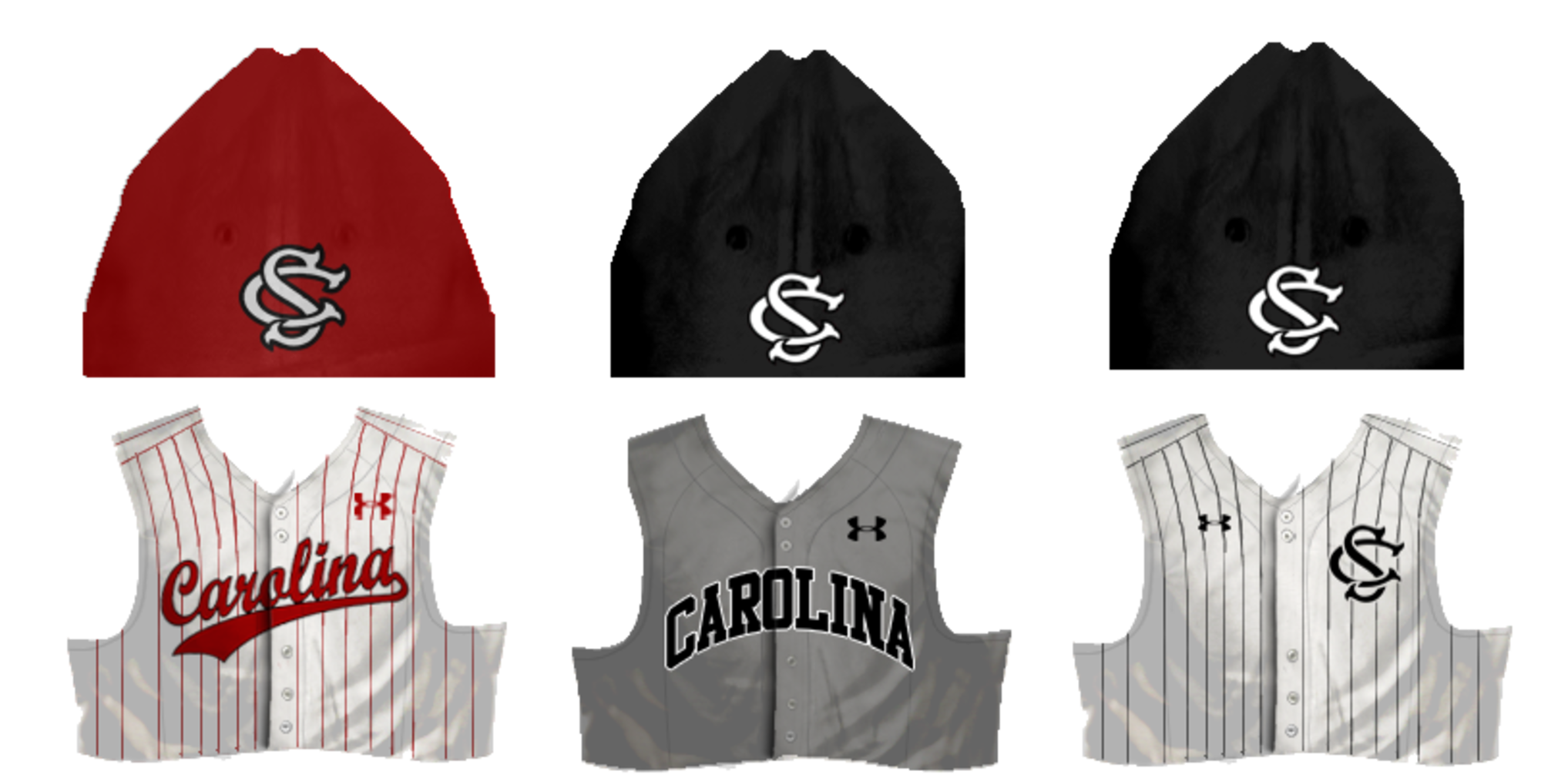

2021 Southeastern Conference baseball standings
	Conf.				Overall
Team	W		L	PCT	W		L	PCT
Eastern
No. 6 Tennessee ^{x}‍‍‍^{y}	20	–	10	.667	50	–	18	.735
No. 2 Vanderbilt ‍‍‍^{y}	19	–	10	.655	49	–	18	.731
Florida ‍‍‍^{y}	17	–	13	.567	38	–	22	.633
South Carolina ‍‍‍^{y}	16	–	14	.533	34	–	23	.596
Georgia ‍‍‍	13	–	17	.433	31	–	25	.554
Kentucky ‍‍‍	12	–	18	.400	29	–	23	.558
Missouri ‍‍‍	8	–	22	.267	15	–	36	.294
Western
No. 5 Arkansas ^{x}‍†‍‡‍^{y}	22	–	8	.733	50	–	13	.794
No. 1 Mississippi State ‍‍‍^{y}	20	–	10	.667	50	–	18	.735
No. 13 Ole Miss ‍‍‍^{y}	18	–	12	.600	45	–	22	.672
No. 18 LSU ‍‍‍^{y}	13	–	17	.433	38	–	25	.603
Alabama ‍‍‍^{y}	12	–	17	.414	32	–	26	.552
Auburn ‍‍‍	10	–	20	.333	25	–	27	.481
Texas A&M ‍‍‍	9	–	21	.300	29	–	27	.518
x – Division champion † – Conference champion ‡ – Tournament champion y – Invited to the NCAA tournament As of June 30, 2021; Rankings from D1Baseball

The 2021 South Carolina Gamecocks baseball team represented the University of South Carolina in the 2021 NCAA Division I baseball season. The 2021 season marked the Gamecocks' 128th overall. The Gamecocks played their home games at Founders Park, and were led by fourth year head coach Mark Kingston.

== Personnel ==
=== Roster ===
2021 South Carolina Gamecocks baseball team
Players
Coaches

#	Pos.	Name	B/T	Height	Weight	Year	Home town
2	INF	Jalen Vasquez	L/R	5 ft 11 in (1.8 m)	170 lb (77 kg)	Fr	North Charleston, SC
3	INF	Braylen Wimmer	R/R	6 ft 4 in (1.93 m)	190 lb (86 kg)	So	Yukon, OK
4	LHP	Jackson Phipps	L/L	6 ft 5 in (1.96 m)	230 lb (104 kg)	Fr	Dallas, GA
5	OF	Josh Shuler	L/R	6 ft 3 in (1.91 m)	220 lb (100 kg)	Fr	Suwanee, GA
6	INF	George Callil	R/R	6 ft 4 in (1.93 m)	201 lb (91 kg)	Sr	Melbourne, AU
7	INF	Brennan Milone	R/R	6 ft 0 in (1.83 m)	200 lb (91 kg)	So	Woodstock, GA
8	INF	Jeff Heinrich	R/R	6 ft 0 in (1.83 m)	189 lb (86 kg)	Sr	Lake in the Hills, IL
9	OF	Noah Myers	L/R	6 ft 1 in (1.85 m)	191 lb (87 kg)	Sr	Wyoming, ON
10	C	Colin Burgess	R/R	5 ft 8 in (1.73 m)	195 lb (88 kg)	So	Lexington, KY
11	OF	Andrew Eyster	R/R	6 ft 3 in (1.91 m)	214 lb (97 kg)	Sr	Ocala, FL
12	INF	Josiah Sightler	L/L	6 ft 5 in (1.96 m)	232 lb (105 kg)	Jr	Gaston, SC
13	RHP	Michael Robinson	R/R	6 ft 3 in (1.91 m)	187 lb (85 kg)	Jr	Elizabethton, TN
14	INF	Joe Satterfield	S/R	6 ft 0 in (1.83 m)	194 lb (88 kg)	Sr	Greenville, SC
15	RHP	Daniel Lloyd	R/R	6 ft 3 in (1.91 m)	232 lb (105 kg)	Jr	Summerville, SC
16	LHP	John Gilreath	L/L	5 ft 11 in (1.8 m)	179 lb (81 kg)	Sr	Rock Hill, SC
18	LHP	Julian Bosnic	L/L	6 ft 3 in (1.91 m)	218 lb (99 kg)	So	Lutz, FL
20	RHP	Andrew Peters	R/R	6 ft 2 in (1.88 m)	191 lb (87 kg)	Jr	Morris, IL
21	LHP	Magdiel Cotto	L/L	6 ft 4 in (1.93 m)	245 lb (111 kg)	Fr	Fort Mill, SC
22	RHP	Brannon Jordan	R/R	6 ft 2 in (1.88 m)	190 lb (86 kg)	Sr	Collinsville, OK
23	RHP	Jack Mahoney	R/R	6 ft 2 in (1.88 m)	210 lb (95 kg)	Fr	Arlington Heights, IL
24	OF	Brandon Fields	R/R	6 ft 1 in (1.85 m)	201 lb (91 kg)	Fr	Orlando, FL
26	INF	Dave Mendham	L/R	6 ft 3 in (1.91 m)	219 lb (99 kg)	Jr	Dorchester, ON
27	C	Alek Boychuck	R/R	6 ft 0 in (1.83 m)	215 lb (98 kg)	Fr	Buford, GA
28	INF	Wes Clarke	R/R	6 ft 2 in (1.88 m)	236 lb (107 kg)	Jr	Forest, VA
30	RHP	Brett Thomas	R/R	6 ft 5 in (1.96 m)	244 lb (111 kg)	So	Atlanta, GA
31	OF	David Cromer	R/R	6 ft 2 in (1.88 m)	227 lb (103 kg)	Fr	Lexington, SC
32	RHP	Will Sanders	R/R	6 ft 6 in (1.98 m)	208 lb (94 kg)	Fr	Atlanta, GA
33	OF	Brady Allen	R/L	6 ft 1 in (1.85 m)	218 lb (99 kg)	Jr	Lakeland, FL
34	RHP	Thomas Farr	R/R	6 ft 0 in (1.83 m)	203 lb (92 kg)	Jr	Tyrone, GA
35	LHP	RJ Dantin	L/L	6 ft 2 in (1.88 m)	200 lb (91 kg)	So	Spartanburg, SC
36	RHP	Cade Austin	R/R	6 ft 3 in (1.91 m)	220 lb (100 kg)	Fr	Chapin, SC
37	RHP	Cam Tringali	R/R	6 ft 4 in (1.93 m)	228 lb (103 kg)	Jr	Columbia, SC
38	RHP	Sam Swygert	L/R	6 ft 2 in (1.88 m)	222 lb (101 kg)	Fr	Springfield, SC
40	RHP	Wesley Sweatt	R/R	6 ft 3 in (1.91 m)	213 lb (97 kg)	Jr	Rock Hill, SC
44	RHP	Parker Coyne	R/R	6 ft 2 in (1.88 m)	210 lb (95 kg)	Sr	Suwanee, GA
45	RHP	CJ Weins	R/R	6 ft 3 in (1.91 m)	222 lb (101 kg)	Jr	Lockport, IL
46	OF	Connor Cino	R/R	6 ft 1 in (1.85 m)	206 lb (93 kg)	Fr	Mt. Pleasant, SC
48	LHP	Jaret Bennett	L/L	6 ft 2 in (1.88 m)	209 lb (95 kg)	Sr	Federalsburg, MD
49	RHP	Brett Kerry	R/R	6 ft 0 in (1.83 m)	213 lb (97 kg)	Jr	Clemmons, NC
50	RHP	Travis Luensmann	R/R	6 ft 6 in (1.98 m)	234 lb (106 kg)	Fr	Altoona, PA

Head coach

Mark Kingston

Assistant coach(es)

Stuart Lake
Skylar Meade
Trip Couch

Legend

- (C) Team captain
- (S) Suspended
- (I) Ineligible
- Injured
- Current redshirt

Roster

=== Coaching staff ===
2021 South Carolina Gamecocks baseball coaching staff
- Mark Kingston - Head coach - 4th year
- Trip Couch - Assistant coach - 2nd (4th overall)
- Stuart Lake - Assistant coach - 5th year
- Skylar Meade - Pitching coach - 4th year
- Mike Current - Player Development - 4th year

=== Opening Day lineup ===
Opening Day Starters
Name	Position
Brady Allen	Right field
Brennan Milone	Third base
Wes Clarke	Designated hitter
David Mendham	First base
Andrew Eyster	Left field
Jeff Heinrich	Second base
Colin Burgess	Catcher
Noah Myers	Center field
George Calill	Shortstop

== Regular season ==
=== February: undefeated start and Series win over Clemson, Clarke named player of the month ===
Dayton (Opening day)

Friday, February 19, 4:00 pm Columbia, South Carolina SEC+
Team	1	2	3	4	5	6	7	8	9	R	H	E
Dayton	0	0	0	0	0	1	0	0	0	1	6	0
South Carolina	3	0	4	0	1	2	0	2	X	12	15	1
WP: T. Farr (1–0) LP: H. Wolfe (0–1); Attendance: 1,938; Notes: Clarke 3 run home run, Eyster grand slam, Farr 6 innings, 8 K's.

South Carolina opened its season with a 12–1 drubbing of Dayton, it was their first game since March 10, 2020. Thomas Farr threw 8 strikeouts and allow only one run. Freshman relivers Cotto, Phipps, and Mahoney each pitched one scoreless inning. Junior Wes Clarke would go 3–4 with 2 HR's and 5 RBI in game 2 of the series. Wimmer, Burgess, and Brady Allen also each homered in a 12–5 win over the Flyers. Game 3 saw the Gamecocks complete the sweep after a 4 run eight inning led by junior David Mendham's bases clearing double. The Dayton series was the first time the two schools have ever met.

vs. Clemson (Greenville)

Saturday, February 27, 4:00 pm Greenville, South Carolina SEC+
Team	1	2	3	4	5	6	7	8	9	10	11	R	H	E
Clemson	0	0	0	1	0	0	0	0	1	0	0	2	7	2
South Carolina	1	0	0	1	0	0	0	0	0	0	1	3	15	1
WP: W. Sanders (1–0) LP: G. Gilbert (0–1); Attendance: 1,800; Notes: South Carolina wins in the 11th on a walk off single from Andrew Eyster.

The Gamecocks would go on to route Winthrop 12–4, behind Wes Clarke's three home runs, bringing his 4-game total to 6 HR's, with a .749 batting avg. 12 RBI, and a 2.308 slugging pct. Clarke would earn National player of the week honors. South Carolina faced their first test vs. Clemson on February 27, after the opening game of the series was postponed. Wes Clarke opened things up with an RBI single, Clemson tied things up at 2 with a home run in the ninth, sending the games to extra innings. Freshman reliever Will Sanders got out of a first and second no out jam in the top of the 11th, and Andrew Eyster hit a game winning double in the bottom of the inning, after a Brady Allen double.

Clemson

Sunday, February 28, 1:30 pm Columbia, South Carolina SEC+
Team	1	2	3	4	5	6	7	8	9	R	H	E
Clemson	1	0	0	0	2	0	4	0	0	7	9	2
South Carolina	0	0	1	0	4	0	2	0	1	8	13	2
WP: W. Sanders (2–0) LP: E. Estridge (0–1); Attendance: 1,938; Notes: Clarke homers twice, Eyster walk off single for the second game in a row.

Game 2 of the series would also prove a thrilling one, after Clemson opened with a first inning run, Wes Clarke hit his 7th HR in the 3rd to tie the game at 1. In the 5th, Clemson took the lead 3–1 after a two run double, the Gamecocks quickly responded in the bottom half highlighted by Wes Clarke's 8th home run in 6 games, a three run shot to put the Gamecocks in the lead 5–3. The two teams would go on to trade leads, culminating in a 7–7 tie heading into the 9th. After Will Sanders got out of a jam in the top of the inning, Andrew Eyster came through with his second straight walk-off hit, with a single to score Clark and to clinch the series win.

Wes Clarke would be named national player of the month for February, after finishing batting .636 with 8 home runs, 17 RBI and a 1.818 slugging percentage.

=== March: Texas series, start of SEC play ===
Mercer

Friday, March 5, 4:00 pm Columbia, South Carolina SEC+
Team	1	2	3	4	5	6	7	8	9	R	H	E
Mercer	0	0	0	0	1	0	0	0	0	1	6	0
South Carolina	0	0	0	2	2	0	1	0	X	5	6	0
WP: T. Farr (2–0) LP: T. Green (0–1); Attendance: 1,938; Notes: Wimmer 2 run home run, Eyster RBI single, Farr 5 innings, 5 K's.

After another midweek crushing of Winthrop 19–8, The Gamecocks would sweep Mercer with dominate pitching (5–1, 4–0, 1–0) allowing just one run the entire series, combining for 44 strikeouts. South Carolina's 10–0 start is the best start since the 2016 team, who then went on to win 20 conference games and win the SEC East. South Carolina has had a ton of great starts to seasons in its history, most notably in 2000 when Ray Tanner's team started off 22–0, and also starting out 18–0 in 2004. Legendary coaches Bobby Richardson and June Raines, also each had seasons where they started out with 13 wins.

at Texas

Friday, March 12, 6:33 pm Austin, Texas LHN
Team	1	2	3	4	5	6	7	8	9	R	H	E
South Carolina	0	1	0	0	0	0	0	0	0	1	4	0
Texas	0	1	0	0	0	0	0	3	X	5	11	0
WP: A. Nixon (2–0) LP: W. Sanders (2–1); Attendance: 1,716; Notes:

South Carolina traveled to Austin, Texas after starting the season 11–0 to face the legendary Longhorns in a three-game set. The Gamecocks would go on to be swept losing by a combined total of 6–15.

at Vanderbilt

Friday, March 19, 6:32 pm Nashville, Tennessee SECN+
Team	1	2	3	4	5	6	7	8	9	R	H	E
South Carolina	0	0	0	0	0	2	0	0	0	2	3	0
Vanderbilt	0	0	0	0	2	0	1	0	X	3	5	0
WP: K. Rocker (5–0) LP: T. Farr (2–1); Attendance: 527; Notes:

The Gamecocks took one of three to open up conference play vs. Vanderbilt, losing the first two games 2–3, 0–5, and winning the third 6–5.

Florida

Friday, March 26, 7:02 pm Columbia, South Carolina SEC+
Team	1	2	3	4	5	6	7	8	9	10	11	12	13	14	R	H	E
Florida	2	1	0	0	2	1	1	0	0	0	0	0	0	1	8	9	1
South Carolina	0	4	0	0	0	2	0	1	0	0	0	0	0	2	9	20	2
WP: J. Bosnic (2–1) LP: B. Specht (0–1); Attendance: 1,938; Notes: Eyster HR ties it, Burgess hits walk off double in the 14th

The Gamecocks won their first SEC home game in a five-hour thriller, that culminated with a Andrew Eyster game tying home run in the 14th, when the Gamecocks were down to their final strike. In that same inning, Colin Burgess would hit a walk off double scoring Jeff Heinrich who got on base via a single, to win the game 9–8.

Saturday, March 27, 4:02 pm Columbia, South Carolina SEC+
Team	1	2	3	4	5	6	7	8	9	R	H	E
Florida	0	1	0	0	0	0	0	0	0	1	5	1
South Carolina	0	0	0	0	3	0	0	1	X	4	5	2
WP: B. Jordan (2–2) LP: J. Leftwich (4–1); Attendance: 1,938; Notes: Jordan strikes out 9, Clarke hits 3 run homer

Wes Clarke hit his NCAA leading 12th home run to clinch South Carolina's first series win over Florida since 2011.

Sunday, March 28, 12:01 pm Columbia, South Carolina SEC+
Team	1	2	3	4	5	6	7	8	9	R	H	E
Florida	0	1	0	2	0	0	0	2	0	5	6	0
South Carolina	0	3	1	0	0	4	0	0	X	8	9	1
WP: W. Sanders (2–2) LP: H. Barco (3–2); Attendance: 1,938; Notes: Gamecocks hit 5 HR's

Brady Allen homered twice, Clarke homered to improve his NCAA best HR total to 13, Sanders, Bosnic, Kerry struck out 14 to help the Gamecocks earn their first SEC sweep of the season against the #5 ranked Gators.

=== April: Georgia, LSU, Arkansas series ===
at Georgia

Sunday, April 4 1:02 pm Athens, Georgia SECN+
Team	1	2	3	4	5	6	7	8	9	R	H	E
South Carolina	1	0	0	0	3	1	0	0	0	5	7	0
Georgia	0	0	1	0	0	0	0	0	0	1	8	0
WP: W. Sanders (5–1) LP: J. Cannon (1–2) Sv: J. Bosnic (1); Attendance: 1,938; Notes: Sanders throws 8 innings allowing only one run, Allen 2 run home run.

South Carolina won their first SEC road series, taking 2 out of 3 from Georgia.

Missouri

Saturday, April 10 12:02 pm Columbia, South Carolina SECN+
Team	1	2	3	4	5	6	7	8	9	R	H	E
Missouri	0	0	0	1	0	0	0	0	0	1	6	0
South Carolina	0	0	0	0	3	6	0	2	0	11	8	0
WP: B. Jordan (4–2) LP: S. Miles (1–6) Sv: D. Lloyd (1); Attendance: 1,938; Notes: Jordan five innings, 1 run and 2 hits, 8 K's, Allen HR, 4 RBI's.

After dropping the first game in the series 1–7, the Gamecocks bounced back in Game 2, winning 11–1. In Game 3 of the series, the Gamecocks won 13–4.

at LSU

Saturday, April 17 11:02 am Baton Rouge, Louisiana SECN+
Team	1	2	3	4	5	6	7	R	H	E
South Carolina	0	0	0	0	0	0	4	4	7	1
LSU	1	1	0	0	0	0	0	2	4	1
WP: A. Peters (3–1) LP: D. Fontenot (1–2) Sv: B. Kerry (3); Attendance: 4,438; Notes: Jordan four innings 2 runs, 6 K's, Wimmer 2 RBI's, Mendham 2 RBI's.

South Carolina once again dropped the opening game of the series to LSU, after Friday's game was postponed, the last two games of the series were back to back 7 inning doubleheaders on Saturday. In game 1 of the doubleheader, South Carolina trailed 2–0 heading into the seventh inning, Mendham and Burgess led off the inning with singles, after a sac bunt moved the runners into scoring position, Wimmer tied the game with a two run double. Brady Allen would also double, giving the Gamecocks a 4–2 lead, Kerry came in for the save in the bottom half of the inning giving the Gamecocks the win.

Saturday, April 17 2:32 pm Baton Rouge, Louisiana SECN+
Team	1	2	3	4	5	6	7	R	H	E
South Carolina	2	3	1	0	0	3	0	9	14	0
LSU	0	0	0	0	0	0	0	0	5	0
WP: W. Sanders (6–1) LP: B. Money (1–2); Attendance: 4,438; Notes: Sanders 6 shut out innings, Wimmer HR, Eyster 3 hits, 1 RBI

The Gamecocks dominated Game two of the doubleheader from the start, putting up 14 hits in the seven innings, Mendham and Wimmer each homered, Will Sanders pitched 6 scoreless innings, and Julian Bosnic came in for a scoreless seventh inning.

Arkansas

Thursday, April 22 7:02 pm Columbia, South Carolina SECN
Team	1	2	3	4	5	6	7	8	9	R	H	E
Arkansas	0	1	0	0	0	0	3	1	1	6	9	1
South Carolina	0	0	0	1	0	0	0	0	0	1	2	2
WP: C. Monke (5–0) LP: T. Farr (2–4) Sv: K. Kopps (5); Attendance: 3,350; Notes:

Friday, April 23 2:02 pm Columbia, South Carolina SECN+
Team	1	2	3	4	5	6	7	8	9	R	H	E
Arkansas	0	1	0	0	1	0	0	0	0	2	4	1
South Carolina	0	0	0	0	0	4	0	2	X	6	9	1
WP: A. Peters (4–1) LP: C. Monke (5–1) Sv: B. Kerry (4); Attendance: 2,864; Notes:

Friday, April 23 7:02 pm Columbia, South Carolina SECN+
Team	1	2	3	4	5	6	7	8	9	R	H	E
Arkansas	0	0	2	0	2	0	1	0	0	5	7	0
South Carolina	0	0	1	0	0	0	0	0	X	1	2	2
WP: P. Wicklander (2–1) LP: W. Sanders (6–2); Attendance: 3,350; Notes:

=== May: end of regular season play, early exit from Hoover ===
Mississippi State

Saturday, May 8 4:02 pm Columbia, South Carolina SECN+
Team	1	2	3	4	5	6	7	8	9	R	H	E
Mississippi State	3	1	1	1	3	0	0	0	0	9	14	2
South Carolina	0	0	0	1	0	2	3	0	0	6	8	1
WP: W. Bednar (5–1) LP: W. Sanders (6–3) Sv: L. Sims (3); Attendance: 3,350; Notes:

The Gamecocks lost the first two games of the series.

Sunday, May 9 2:02 pm Columbia, South Carolina SECN+
Team	1	2	3	4	5	6	7	8	9	10	11	R	H	E
Mississippi State	0	0	1	0	1	1	0	0	0	0	0	3	9	1
South Carolina	0	2	0	0	0	0	0	0	1	0	0	4	10	0
WP: J. Bosnic (3–2) LP: B. Smith (4–2); Attendance: 2,810; Notes: Kerry 6 innings, 1 run, Mendham HR, Walk off double, 3 RBI

After Mendham's HR made it 2–0 Gamecocks, Mississippi State came back scoring three runs to take the lead. Heading into the ninth, SC was down one run, Heinrich doubled to right scoring Myers tying the game, sending it to extra innings. In the eleventh Heinrich singled with one out, and was able to score on Mendham's double to left, winning the game 4–3.

at Kentucky

Friday, May 14 6:32 pm Lexington, Kentucky SECN+
Team	1	2	3	4	5	6	7	8	9	R	H	E
South Carolina	4	0	0	3	3	0	0	1	1	12	12	1
Kentucky	0	0	3	0	0	0	3	0	0	6	9	1
WP: B. Jordan (5–4) LP: C. Stupp (4–5) Sv: J. Bosnic (3); Attendance: 1,566; Notes: Jordan 5 innings, 6 K's, 3 runs, Allen, Sightler, Wimmer each with 3 hits

Carolina opened up the series with a monster four run first inning, on five hits, Wimmer tripled home two. Kentucky would score three in the third inning cutting the lead to one, before SC scored three in the fourth, and three in the fifth. Kentucky added three runs in the seventh to cut it to 10–6, the Gamecocks added insurance runs with a run in the eight, and a run in the ninth on a Wimmer solo home run. Bosnic earned the save going two innings striking out four.

Saturday, May 15 2:02 pm Lexington, Kentucky SECN+
Team	1	2	3	4	5	6	7	8	9	R	H	E
South Carolina	1	0	0	0	1	4	0	1	2	9	7	0
Kentucky	0	0	0	0	0	0	0	0	0	0	4	0
WP: B. Kerry (4–1) LP: S. Harney (3–1); Attendance: 1,504; Notes: Kerry complete game shutout, Eyster Grand Slam, 5 RBI

Sightler opened the game with an RBI ground out, Mendham would also have an RBI ground out in the fifth making it 2–0, in the sixth Carolina broke it open with a Andrew Eyster grand slam, his second grand slam of the season, making it 6–0. After adding another run in the eight, Wimmer hit a two run home run in the ninth to make it 9–0. Brett Kerry pitched a complete game shutout, the first by a Gamecock pitcher since Wil Crowe in a regional game in 2014.

Sunday, May 16 1:02 pm Lexington, Kentucky SECN+
Team	1	2	3	4	5	6	7	8	9	R	H	E
South Carolina	0	0	3	3	1	0	3	0	1	11	15	1
Kentucky	0	0	0	1	0	2	2	1	0	6	9	1
WP: T. Farr (4–1) LP: Z. Lee (4–6); Attendance: 1,149; Notes: Eyster 4 hits, 4 RBI

The Gamecocks scored three in the third, Eyster doubled home a run, and Sightler hit a two run home run, they would add three in the fourth inning to make it 6–0 thanks to a two run double by Wes Clarke. Kentucky added a unearned run in the fourth to make it 6–1, and added two more in the sixth, in the seventh Allen singled home two runs to make it 9–3, and Eyster had another hit with a RBI single. The Gamecocks went on to win the game 11–6, Will Sanders pitched a scoreless ninth inning in relief.

Tennessee

Thursday, May 20 7:02 pm Columbia, South Carolina SECN+
Team	1	2	3	4	5	6	7	8	9	R	H	E
Tennessee	0	0	1	6	0	0	0	0	3	10	12	1
South Carolina	0	0	0	2	0	0	0	2	0	4	7	0
WP: C. Dallas (9–1) LP: B. Jordan (5–5) Sv: S. Hunley (6); Attendance: 4,015; Notes: Wes Clarke 21st HR, Eyster two run HR

South Carolina dropped Game 1 of the series, Wes Clarke and Andrew Eyster both homered, but Jordan's poor start proved to be too much to overcome.

Friday, May 21 7:02 pm Columbia, South Carolina SECN+
Team	1	2	3	4	5	6	7	8	9	R	H	E
Tennessee	0	0	1	1	0	0	0	0	0	2	8	0
South Carolina	0	0	0	0	3	0	0	0	0	3	6	0
WP: B. Kerry (5–1) LP: C. Sewell (3–1) Sv: J. Bosnic (4); Attendance: 5,712; Notes: Allen 3 run HR, Kerry 7 innings, 8 K's, 2 runs

The Gamecocks took Game 2 of the series with a three run home run from Brett Kerry in the sixth, and seven quality innings from Brett Kerry. Bosnic would pick up the save shutting down the Vols in the final two frames.

Saturday, May 22 12:02 pm Columbia, South Carolina SECN
Team	1	2	3	4	5	6	7	8	9	R	H	E
Tennessee	0	1	0	4	0	0	0	0	0	5	8	0
South Carolina	1	0	0	0	0	0	0	3	0	4	8	0
WP: B. Tidwell (7–3) LP: T. Farr (3–6) Sv: S. Hunley (7); Attendance: 5,028; Notes: Allen 3 for 5 with a HR

SC's late rally attempt came up just short, as the Gamecocks lost a heartbreaking one run game to finish the regular season.

Alabama (SEC Tournament)

Tuesday, May 25 1:02 pm Hoover, Alabama SECN
Team	1	2	3	4	5	6	7	8	9	R	H	E
Alabama	0	0	6	2	0	1	0	0	0	9	7	0
South Carolina	0	0	0	2	0	1	0	0	0	3	7	1
WP: T. Ras (7–4) LP: C. Weins (1–1) Sv: B. Guffey (2); Attendance: 3,499; Notes: Clarke 22nd HR, Wimmer HR

The Gamecocks disturbing history in Hoover continued as they fell hard to elimination eliminated in the opening game against unranked Alabama, not even making it past Tuesday before heading home.

== Postseason ==
=== Columbia Regional ===
Virginia

Friday, June 4 12:06 pm Columbia, South Carolina ESPN2
Team	1	2	3	4	5	6	7	8	9	R	H	E
Virginia	0	0	2	1	0	0	0	0	0	3	7	1
South Carolina	1	0	0	0	0	3	0	0	0	4	6	1
WP: J. Bosnic (4–2) LP: A. Abbott (8–6) Sv: D. Lloyd (2); Attendance: 5,544; Notes: Clarke 23rd HR, Sightler game tying 2 run double in 6th

Wes Clarke opened up the Columbia regional with his NCAA best 23rd home run of the season in the first inning, starter Brett Kerry was pulled in the third due to injury, replaced by Julian Bosnic. The Gamecocks trailed 3–1 heading into the bottom of the sixth before Josiaha Sightler would hit a two run RBI double, after Wes Clarkes ground rule double put two in scoring position. After that catcher Collin Burgess singled giving the gamecocks a 4–3 lead. Daniel Lloyd came in to relieve Bosnic in the seventh, and he would not allow a run over the following three innings to get the save and put South Carolina into the winners bracket.

Old Dominion

Saturday, June 5 8:06 pm Columbia, South Carolina ESPN2
Team	1	2	3	4	5	6	7	8	9	R	H	E
Old Dominion	0	1	0	0	0	0	0	1	0	2	5	1
South Carolina	0	0	0	1	0	0	0	0	0	1	3	1
WP: R. Moore (9–1) LP: T. Farr (3–7) Sv: A. Holiday (1); Attendance: 7,315; Notes: Farr 7.2 innings pitched, only 2 runs allowed

The Gamecocks faced Old Dominion in Game 2 of the regional in a low scoring pitchers duel, both starters would pitch 7 innings only allowing one run. In the 8th inning, South Carolina left starter Thomas Farr in a batter too long, walking in what would end up being the game winning run, as the Gamecocks sent themselves into the losers bracket of their own regional.

Virginia (Elimination game)

Sunday, June 6 12:06 pm Columbia, South Carolina ESPNU
Team	1	2	3	4	5	6	7	8	9	R	H	E
South Carolina	0	0	0	0	0	1	1	0	0	2	7	1
Virginia	1	1	1	0	0	0	0	0	0	3	7	0
WP: M. Wyatt (3–1) LP: B. Jordan (5–6) Sv: S. Schoch (8); Attendance: 4,320; Notes: Milone HR

After giving up three runs in the first three innings, the Gamecocks rallied back to cut the lead to just one late with a Wes Clarke RBI ground out, and a Milone solo home run, but Virginia's closer Schoch would come in the 7th and shut down the Gamecocks, striking out five of the eight batters he faced. The tough one run loss eliminated South Carolina from their own regional.

== Schedule and results ==
2021 South Carolina Gamecocks baseball game log
Regular season

February (6–0)
Date	Opponent	Rank	Site/stadium	Score	Win	Loss	Save	TV	Attendance	Overall record	SEC record
February 19	Dayton	No. 18	Founders Park; Columbia, SC	W 12–1	T. Farr (1–0)	H. Wolfe (0–1)		SECN+	1,938	1–0	
February 20	Dayton	No. 18	Founders Park	W 12–5	A. Peters (1–0)	B. Olson (0–1)		SECN+	1,938	2–0	
February 21	Dayton	No. 18	Founders Park	W 5–1	B. Kerry (1–0)	A. Zapka (0–1)		SECN+	1,938	3–0	
February 23	Winthrop	No. 17	Founders Park	W 12–4	J. Gilreath (1–0)	G. Garrett (0–1)		SECN+	1,938	4–0	
February 27	vs. Clemson	No. 17	Fluor Field; Greenville, SC	W 3–2^{(11)}	W. Sanders (1–0)	G. Gilbert (0–1)		SECN+	1,800	5–0	
February 28	Clemson	No. 17	Founders Park	W 8–7	W. Sanders (2–0)	E. Estridge (0–1)		SECN+	1,938	6–0	

March (11–6)
Date	Opponent	Rank	Site/stadium	Score	Win	Loss	Save	TV	Attendance	Overall record	SEC record
March 2	at Winthrop	No. 14	Winthrop Ballpark; Rockhill, SC	W 19–8	J. Sightler (1–0)	D. Skinner (2–1)			550	7–0	
March 5	Mercer	No. 14	Founders Park	W 5–1	T. Farr (2–0)	T. Green (0–2)		SEC+	1,938	8–0	
March 6	Mercer	No. 14	Founders Park	W 4–0	B. Jordan (1–0)	T. Lobus (1–2)		SEC+	1,938	9–0	
March 7	Mercer	No. 14	Founders Park	W 1–0	J. Bosnic (1–0)	J. Kelley (1–2)	B. Kerry (1)	SECN	1,938	10–0	
March 10	at The Citadel	No. 12	Joseph Riley Park; Charleston, SC	W 11–7	A. Peters (2–0)	L. Barker (0–2)		ESPN+	1,500	11–0	
March 12	at No. 19 Texas	No. 12	Disch–Falk Field; Austin, TX	L 1–4	A. Nixon (1–1)	W. Sanders (2–1)		LHN	1,716	11–1	
March 13	at No. 19 Texas	No. 12	Disch–Falk Field	L 0–3	T. Stevens (1–1)	B. Jordan (1–1)	P. Wenzel (1)	LHN	1,786	11–2	
March 14	at No. 19 Texas	No. 12	Disch–Falk Field	L 5–8	T. Witt (1–0)	J. Bosnic (1–1)		LHN	1,687	11-3	
March 17	Davidson	No. 16	Founders Park	L 4–9	W. Schomberg (1–0)	T. Luensmann (0–1)		SECN+	1,938	11–4	
March 19	at No. 2 Vanderbilt	No. 16	Hawkins Field; Nashville, TN	L 2–3	K. Rocker (5–0)	T. Farr (2–1)	L. Murphy (3)	SECN+	527	11–5	0–1
March 20	at No. 2 Vanderbilt	No. 16	Hawkins Field	L 0–5	J. Leiter (5–0)	B. Jordan (1–2)		SECN	497	11–6	0–2
March 21	at No. 2 Vanderbilt	No. 16	Hawkins Field	W 6–5	B. Kerry (2–0)	N. Maldonado (0–1)		SECN+	496	12–6	1–2
March 23	The Citadel	No. 25	Founders Park	W 8–3	W. Sanders (3–1)	D. Beckley (1–2)		SECN	1,938	13–6	1–2
March 26	No. 5 Florida	No. 25	Founders Park	W 9–8^{(14)}	J. Bosnic (2–1)	B. Specht (0–1)		SECN+	1,938	14–6	2–2
March 27	No. 5 Florida	No. 25	Founders Park	W 4–1	B. Jordan (2–2)	J. Leftwich (4–1)		SECN+	1,938	15–6	3–2
March 28	No. 5 Florida	No. 25	Founders Park	W 8–5	W. Sanders (4–1)	H. Barco (3–2)		SECN+	1,938	16–6	4–2
March 31	Gardner–Webb	No. 14	Founders Park	W 9–4	J. Mahoney (1–0)	N. Davis (0–1)		SECN+	1,938	17–6	4–2

April (9–7)
Date	Opponent	Rank	Site/stadium	Score	Win	Loss	Save	TV	Attendance	Overall record	SEC record
April 2	at Georgia	No. 14	Foley Field; Athens, GA	L 3–5	M. Polk (1–0)	A. Peters (2–1)	B. Harris (1)	SECN+	664	17–7	4–3
April 3	at Georgia	No. 14	Foley Field	W 13–7	B. Jordan (3–2)	R. Webb (2–1)		SECN+	664	18–7	5–3
April 4	at Georgia	No. 14	Foley Field	W 5–1	W. Sanders (5–1)	J. Cannon (1–2)	J. Bosnic (1)	SECN+	664	19–7	6–3
April 6	vs. North Carolina	No. 11	Truist Field; Charlotte, NC	L 2–3^{(10)}	C. O'Brien (3–0)	J. Bosnic (2–2)		SECN	2,729	19–8	6–3
April 9	Missouri	No. 11	Founders Park	L 2–7	L. Veinbergs (1–0)	T. Farr (2–2)		SECN+	1,938	19–9	6–4
April 10	Missouri	No. 11	Founders Park	W 11–1	B. Jordan (4–2)	S. Miles (1–6)	D. Lloyd (1)	SECN+	1,938	20–9	7–4
April 11	Missouri	No. 11	Founders Park	W 13–4	B. Kerry (3–0)	Z. Hise (0–4)		SECN	1,938	21–9	8–4
April 13	Charleston Southern	No. 11	Founders Park	W 9–0	J. Mahoney (1–0)	J. Bridges (1–1)		SECN+	1,938	22–9	8–4
April 15	at LSU	No. 11	Alex Box Stadium; Baton Rouge, LA	L 1–5	L. Marceaux (4–3)	T. Farr (2–3)		ESPNU	3,747	22–10	8–5
April 17	at LSU	No. 11	Alex Box Stadium	W 4–2^{(7)}	A. Peters (3–1)	D. Fontenot (1–2)	B. Kerry (3)	SECN+	4,282	23–10	9–5
April 17	at LSU	No. 11	Alex Box Stadium	W 9–0^{(7)}	W. Sanders (6–1)	B. Money (1–2)		SECN+	4,438	24–10	10–5
April 22	No. 1 Arkansas	No. 11	Founders Park	L 1–6	C. Monke (5–0)	T. Farr (2–4)	K. Kopps (5)	SECN	3,350	24–11	10–6
April 23	No. 1 Arkansas	No. 11	Founders Park	W 6–2	A. Peters (4–1)	C. Monke (5–1)		SECN+	2,864	24–12	11–6
April 23	No. 1 Arkansas	No. 11	Founders Park	L 1–5	P. Wicklander (2–1)	W. Sanders (6–2)		SECN	3,350	24–11	10–6
April 27	The Citadel	No. 13	Founders Park	W 9–5	J. Mahoney (3–0)	L. Todd (2–6)		SECN+	2,514	26–12	11–7
April 30	at No. 19 Ole Miss	No. 13	Swayze Field; Oxford, MS	L 1–5	G. Hoglund (4–2)	T. Farr (2–5)		SECN+	8,581	26–13	11–8

May (7–8)
Date	Opponent	Rank	Site/stadium	Score	Win	Loss	Save	TV	Attendance	Overall record	SEC record
May 1	at No. 19 Ole Miss	No. 13	Swayze Field	L 3–7	D. Nikhazy (5–2)	B. Jordan (4–3)		SECN+	7,776	26–14	11–9
May 1	at No. 19 Ole Miss	No. 13	Swayze Field	L 4–6	G. Hoglund (4–2)	B. Kerry (3–1)		SECN+	8,879	26–15	11–10
May 5	North Florida	No. 19	Founders Park	W 7–6	M. Cotto (1–0)	R. Jean (2–1)	J. Bosnic (2)	SECN+	2,045	27–15	11–10
May 7	No. 4 Mississippi State	No. 19	Founders Park	L 0–9	C. MacLeod (4–3)	B. Jordan (4–4)		SECN+	3,017	27–16	11–11
May 8	No. 4 Mississippi State	No. 19	Founders Park	L 6–9	W. Bednar (5–1)	W. Sanders (6–3)	L. Sims (6)	SECN+	3,350	27–17	11–12
May 9	No. 4 Mississippi State	No. 19	Founders Park	W 4–3^{(11)}	J. Bosnic (5–1)	B. Smith (4–2)		SECN+	2,810	28–17	12–12
May 11	at Clemson	No. 25	Doug Kingsmore Stadium; Clemson, SC	L 2-7	P. Labriola (1-0)	D. Lloyd (0-1)	N. Hoffman (4)	ACCN+	2,205	28–18	12–12
May 14	at Kentucky	No. 25	Kentucky Proud Park; Lexington, KY	W 12–6	B. Jordan (5–4)	C. Stupp (4–5)	J. Bosnic (3)	SECN+	1,556	29–18	13–12
May 15	at Kentucky	No. 25	Kentucky Proud Park	W 9–0	B. Kerry (4–1)	S. Harney (3–1)		SECN+	1,504	30–18	14–12
May 16	at Kentucky	No. 25	Kentucky Proud Park	W 11–6	T. Farr (3–5)	Z. Lee (4–6)		SECN+	1,149	31–18	15–12
May 18	Appalachian State	No. 21	Founders Park	W 2–0	C. Weins (1–0)	B. Peterson (1–3)	W. Sanders (1)	SECN+	2,538	32–18	15–12
May 20	No. 4 Tennessee	No. 21	Founders Park	L 4–10	C. Dallas (9-1)	B. Jordan (5-5)	S. Hunley (6)	SECN+	4,015	32–19	15–13
May 21	No. 4 Tennessee	No. 21	Founders Park	W 3–2	B. Kerry (5–1)	C. Sewell (3–1)	J. Bosnic (4)	SECN+	5,712	33–19	16–13
May 22	No. 4 Tennessee	No. 21	Founders Park	L 4–5	B. Tidwell (7–3)	T. Farr (3–6)	S. Hunley (7)	SECN	5,028	33–20	16–14

Post-season (1–3)

SEC Tournament (0–1)
Date	Opponent	Seed/Rank	Site/stadium	Score	Win	Loss	Save	TV	Attendance	Overall record	SECT Record
May 25	(10) Alabama	(7)	Hoover Metropolitan Stadium; Hoover, AL	L 3–9	T. Ras (7–4)	C. Weins (1–1)	B. Guffey (2)	SECN	3,499	33–21	0–1

NCAA Columbia Regional (1–2)
Date	Time (ET)	TV	Opponent	Rank	Stadium	Score	Win	Loss	Save	Attendance	Overall	Postseason
June 4	12:00 p.m.	ESPN2	vs. Virginia; Regional First Round	(2)	Founders Park	W 4–3	J. Bosnic (4–2)	A. Abbott (8–6)	D. LLoyd (2)	5,444	34–21	1–0
June 5	8:00 p.m.	SECN	vs. No. 15 Old Dominion; Regional Second Round	(2)	Founders Park	L 1–2	R. Moore (9–1)	T. Farr (3–7)	A. Holiday (1)	7,315	34–22	1–1
June 6	12:00 p.m.	ESPNU	vs. Virginia; Regional Elimination Round	(2)	Founders Park	L 2–3	M. Wyatt (3–1)	B. Jordan (5–6)	S. Schoch (8)	4,320	34–23	1–2

Schedule source:

*Rankings are based on the team's current ranking in the D1Baseball poll.

=== Columbia Regional ===
Columbia Regional Teams
(1) Old Dominion Monarchs	(2) South Carolina Gamecocks	(3) Virginia Cavaliers	(4) Jacksonville Dolphins

First Round
1	Old Dominion	4
4	Jacksonville	3
3	Virginia	3
2	South Carolina	4
Lower round 1
4	Jacksonville	8
3	Virginia	13

Semi-Finals
1	Old Dominion	2
2	South Carolina	1
Lower final
2	South Carolina	2
3	Virginia	3

Finals
1	Old Dominion
3	Virginia

== Rankings ==
Ranking movements Legend: ██ Increase in ranking ██ Decrease in ranking — = Not ranked
	Week																		
Poll	Pre	1	2	3	4	5	6	7	8	9	10	11	12	13	14	15	16	17	Final
Coaches'	20	20*	12	8	17	23	15	12	11	11	15	18	21	18	24	—	—	—	—
Baseball America	18	16	13	10	12	20	11	9	10	9	12	15	24	21	25	—	—	—	—
Collegiate Baseball^	21	20	13	5	18	—	8	5	5	7	7	12	16	15	16	16	—	—	—
NCBWA†	23	16	13	7	15	24	16	12	14	13	14	18	21	18	16	21	—	—	—
D1Baseball	18	17	14	12	16	25	14	11	11	11	13	19	25	21	—	—	—	—	—

^ Collegiate Baseball ranked 40 teams in their preseason poll, but only ranked 30 teams weekly during the season.
† NCBWA ranks 30 teams in their preseason poll, but only ranks 25 teams weekly during the season.
* A new poll was not released for this week, so for comparison purposes, the previous week's ranking is inserted in this week's slot.

== Record vs. conference opponents ==
Last two do not qualify for conf. tourn. Blank are not scheduled. Blue are home games, otherwise away.

2021 SEC baseball records Source: 2021 SEC baseball game results, 2021 SEC baseball schedule
Team	W–L	ALA	ARK	AUB	FLA	UGA	KEN	LSU	MSU	MIZZ	MISS	SCAR	TENN	TAMU	VAN	Team	Div	SR	SW
ALA	12–17		1–2	2–1	.	.	1–2	1–2	0–3	3–0	0–3	.	1–2	3–0	0–2	ALA	W5	3–7	2–2
ARK	22–8	2–1		2–1	3–0	2–1	.	2–1	3–0	.	2–1	2–1	2–1	2–1	.	ARK	W1	10–0	2–0
AUB	10–20	1–2	1–2		1–2	2–1	0–3	1–2	0–3	2–1	0–3	.	.	2–1	.	AUB	W6	3–7	0–3
FLA	17–13	.	0–3	2–1		2–1	2–1	.	.	3–0	2–1	0–3	1–2	3–0	2–1	FLA	E3	7–3	2–2
UGA	13–17	.	1–2	1–2	1–2		2–1	.	.	2–1	1–2	1–2	1–2	1–2	2–1	UGA	E5	3–7	0–0
KEN	12–18	2–1	.	3–0	1–2	1–2		1–2	0–3	2–1	.	0–3	1–2	.	1–2	KEN	E6	3–7	1–2
LSU	13–17	2–1	1–2	2–1	.	.	2–1		1–2	.	2–1	1–2	0–3	2–1	0–3	LSU	W4	5–5	0–2
MSU	20–10	3–0	0–3	3–0	.	.	3–0	2–1		1–2	2–1	2–1	.	3–0	1–2	MSU	W2	7–3	4–1
MIZZ	8–22	0–3	.	1–2	0–3	1–2	1–2	.	2–1		.	1–2	0–3	2–1	0–3	MIZZ	E7	2–8	0–4
MISS	18–12	3–0	1–2	3–0	1–2	2–1	.	1–2	1–2	.		3–0	.	1–2	2–1	MISS	W3	5–5	3–0
SCAR	16–14	.	1–2	.	3–0	2–1	3–0	2–1	1–2	2–1	0–3		1–2	.	1–2	SCAR	E4	5–5	2–1
TENN	20–10	2–1	1–2	.	2–1	2–1	2–1	3–0	.	3–0	.	2–1		2–1	1–2	TENN	E1	8–2	2–0
TAMU	9–21	0–3	1–2	1–2	0–3	2–1	.	1–2	0–3	1–2	2–1	.	1–2		.	TAMU	W7	2–8	0–3
VAN	19–10	2–0	.	.	1–2	1–2	2–1	3–0	2–1	3–0	1–2	2–1	2–1	.		VAN	E2	7–3	2–0
Team	W–L	ALA	ARK	AUB	FLA	UGA	KEN	LSU	MSU	MIZZ	MISS	SCAR	TENN	TAMU	VAN	Team	Div	SR	SW

Updated for entire regular season.

== 2021 MLB draft ==
Player	Position	Round	Overall	MLB team
Brett Kerry	RHP	5	141	Los Angeles Angels
Brady Allen	OF	5	149	Miami Marlins
Thomas Farr	RHP	5	150	Cincinnati Reds
Brannon Jordan	RHP	9	267	Milwaukee Brewers
Andrew Peters	RHP	10	291	Los Angeles Angels
Wes Clarke	C	10	297	Milwaukee Brewers
Daniel Lloyd	RHP	14	407	Baltimore Orioles
Julian Bosnic	LHP	16	467	San Francisco Giants

Bosnic did not sign with the Giants and returned to South Carolina.
