= 2021 Nicholls Colonels baseball team =

College baseball season

2021 Nicholls Colonels baseball
- Conference: Southland Conference
- Record: 21–34 (16–24 Southland)
- Head coach: Seth Thibodeaux (11th season)
- Assistant coaches: Tyler Cook; Ford Pemberton; Lee Clark
- Home stadium: Ben Meyer Diamond at Ray E. Didier Field

2021 Southland Conference baseball standings
| | Conf. | | | | Overall |
| Team | W | | L | PCT | W | | L | PCT |
|---|---|---|---|---|---|---|---|---|
| Abilene Christian ‍†‍‍ | 25 | – | 13 | .658 | 36 | – | 21 | .632 |
| Texas A&M–Corpus Christi ‍‍‍ | 20 | – | 14 | .588 | 25 | – | 29 | .463 |
| New Orleans ‍‍‍ | 23 | – | 17 | .575 | 29 | – | 28 | .509 |
| Sam Houston State ‍‍‍ | 20 | – | 15 | .571 | 30 | – | 25 | .545 |
| Southeastern Louisiana ‍‍‍ | 22 | – | 17 | .564 | 32 | – | 24 | .571 |
| Northwestern State ‍‍‍ | 20 | – | 16 | .556 | 27 | – | 26 | .509 |
| McNeese State ‍‍‡‍^{y} | 21 | – | 18 | .538 | 32 | – | 30 | .516 |
| Lamar ‍‍‍ | 17 | – | 19 | .472 | 25 | – | 23 | .521 |
| Central Arkansas ‍‍‍ | 18 | – | 22 | .450 | 23 | – | 28 | .451 |
| Stephen F. Austin ‍‍‍ | 17 | – | 22 | .436 | 20 | – | 31 | .392 |
| Incarnate Word ‍‍‍ | 17 | – | 23 | .425 | 21 | – | 28 | .429 |
| Nicholls ‍‍‍ | 16 | – | 24 | .400 | 21 | – | 34 | .382 |
| Houston Baptist ‍‍‍ | 11 | – | 27 | .289 | 14 | – | 38 | .269 |
† – Conference champion ‡ – Tournament champion y – Invited to the NCAA tournament As of June 6, 2021; Rankings from D1Baseball

The 2021 Nicholls Colonels baseball team represented Nicholls State University during the 2021 NCAA Division I baseball season. The Colonels played their home games at Ben Meyer Diamond at Ray E. Didier Field and were led by eleventh–year head coach Seth Thibodeaux. They were members of the Southland Conference. On June 2, 2021, following the conclusion of the 2021 season, Seth Thibodeaux resigned from his head coaching duties after amassing an overall record of 287–290 in his eleven seasons.

== Preseason ==
=== Southland Conference Coaches Poll ===
The Southland Conference Coaches Poll was released on February 11, 2021, and the Colonels were picked to finish eighth in the conference with 108 votes.

Coaches poll
| Predicted finish | Team | Votes (1st place) |
| 1 | Sam Houston State | 276 (17) |
| 2 | Central Arkansas | 247 (5) |
| 3 | McNeese State | 244 (1) |
| 4 | Southeastern Louisiana | 243 (3) |
| 5 | Northwestern State | 193 |
| 6 | Texas A&M–Corpus Christi | 146 |
| 7 | Incarnate Word | 144 |
| 8 | Nicholls | 108 |
| 9 | New Orleans | 101 |
| 10 | Abilene Christian | 98 |
| 11 | Stephen F. Austin | 92 |
| 12 | Lamar | 87 |
| 13 | Houston Baptist | 49 |

=== Preseason All-Southland Team & Honors ===
==== First Team ====
- Ryan Flores (UIW, 1st Base)
- Nate Fisbeck (MCNS, 2nd Base)
- Beau Orlando (UCA, 3rd Base)
- JC Correa (LAMR, Shortstop)
- Gavin Johnson (SHSU, Catcher)
- Clayton Rasbeary (MCNS, Designated Hitter)
- Sean Arnold (UIW, Outfielder)
- Brandon Bena (HBU, Outfielder)
- Colton Cowser (SHSU, Outfielder)
- Noah Cameron (UCA, Pitcher)
- Will Dion (MCNS, Pitcher)
- Kyle Gruller (HBU, Pitcher)
- Conner Williams (UCA, Pitcher)
- Itchy Burts (TAMUCC, Utility)

==== Second Team ====
- Preston Faulkner (SELA, 1st Base)
- Logan Berlof (LAMR, 2nd Base)
- Anthony Quirion (LAMR, 3rd Base)
- Reid Bourque (MCNS, Shortstop)
- Chris Sandberg (NICH, Catcher)
- Lee Thomas (UIW, Designated Hitter)
- Josh Ragan (UCA, Outfielder)
- Jack Rogers (SHSU, Outfielder)
- Tyler Smith (NSU, Outfielder)
- John Gaddis (TAMUCC, Pitcher)
- Gavin Stone (UCA, Pitcher)
- Luke Taggart (UIW, Pitcher)
- Jeremy Rodriguez (SFA, Pitcher)
- Jake Dickerson (MCNS, Utility)

== Roster ==
2021 Nicholls Colonels roster
| Pitchers: 3 Cade Evans - Junior; 12 Devin Desandro - Freshman; 18 Logan Miracle - Sophomore; 19 Tyler Theriot - Sophomore; 20 Nick Heckman - Sophomore; 21 Trever Kilcrease - Senior; 24 Nick Hill - Sophomore; 28 Chase Gearing - Sophomore; 30 Joe Taylor - Junior; 31 David Vial Jr. - Junior; 32 Colin Kramer - Senior; 37 Luke Barbier - Freshman; 38 Nico Saltaformaggio - Freshman; 39 Bradley Ely - Sophomore; 40 Gavin Galy - Freshman; 42 Josh Mancuso - Sophomore; 44 Peter Holland - Senior; 47 Beau Balado - Senior | Catchers: 6 Greg Anderberg - Senior; 34 Parker Serio - Freshman; 41 Austin Trahan - Sophomore; 45 Erick Hernandez - Junior; 46 Lucas Hatch - Sophomore; Infielders: 1 Justin Ory - Redshirt Junior; 2 Blaise Breerwood - Freshman; 11 Dillon Belle - Senior; 14 JD Davis - Senior; 15 Austin Cain - Sophomore; 16 Alex Galy - Senior; 25 Grant Askins - Sophomore; 29 Parker Coddou - Freshman; 36 Kyle Boudreaux - Sophomore; Outfielders: 4 Mason Turner - Sophomore; 5 Wes Toups - Freshman; 7 Basiel Williams - Redshirt Freshman; 8 Xane Washington - Redshirt Sophomore; 13 Dane Simon - Junior; 22 Alec Paz - Senior; 23 Caleb Hill - Freshman; 27 Garrett Urry - Freshman; 50 Donovan Hamilton - Freshman |

=== Coaching staff ===
2021 Nicholls Colonels coaching staff
- Seth Thibodeaux – Head Coach – 11th year
- Tyler Cook – Assistant Head Coach/Pitching Coach/Recruiting Coordinator/MLB Liaison – 2nd year
- Ford Pemberton – Assistant Head Coach/Hitting Coach/Academic Liaison – 5th year
- Lee Clark – Assistant Head Coach/Outfielders Coach/Camp Coordinator – 1st year
- Rickey Smith – Player Development/Operations Coordinator – 2nd year

== Schedule and results ==
Legend
| | Nicholls win |
| | Nicholls loss |
| | Postponement/Cancelation/Suspensions |
| **Bold** | Nicholls team member |

2021 Nicholls Colonels baseball game log
Regular season (21-34)

February (2-4)
| Date | Opponent | Rank | Site/stadium | Score | Win | Loss | Save | TV | Attendance | Overall record | SLC Record |
|---|---|---|---|---|---|---|---|---|---|---|---|
| Feb. 20 | Eastern Illinois | | Ben Meyer Diamond at Ray E. Didier Field • Thibodaux, LA | **W** 11-4 | **Saltaformaggio** (1-0) | Decicco (0-1) | None | | 571 | 1-0 | |
| Feb. 20 | Eastern Illinois | | Ben Meyer Diamond at Ray E. Didier Field • Thibodaux, LA | **L** 3-4 | Hampton (1-0) | **Gearing** (0-1) | Stevenson (1) | | 657 | 1-1 | |
| Feb. 21 | Eastern Illinois | | Ben Meyer Diamond at Ray E. Didier Field • Thibodaux, LA | **L** 2-3 (10 inns) | Laxner (1-0) | **Taylor** (0-1) | Anshutz (1) | | 584 | 1-2 | |
| Feb. 26 | Youngstown State | | Ben Meyer Diamond at Ray E. Didier Field • Thibodaux, LA | **W** 7-6 | **Desandro** (1-0) | Brosky (0-1) | **Taylor** (1) | | 547 | 2-2 | |
| Feb. 27 | at No. 11 LSU | | Alex Box Stadium, Skip Bertman Field • Baton Rouge, LA | **L** 0-14 | Marceaux (1-0) | **Theriot** (0-1) | None | SECN+ | 3,003 | 2-3 | |
| Feb. 28 | Youngstown State | | Ben Meyer Diamond at Ray E. Didier Field • Thibodaux, LA | **L** 4-7 | Ball (1-0) | **Heckman** (0-1) | Clift Jr. (2) | | 737 | 2-4 | |

March (9-8)
| Date | Opponent | Rank | Site/stadium | Score | Win | Loss | Save | TV | Attendance | Overall record | SLC Record |
|---|---|---|---|---|---|---|---|---|---|---|---|
| Mar. 3 | at No. 11 LSU | | Alex Box Stadium, Skip Bertman Field • Baton Rouge, LA | **L** 4-5 | Fontenot (1-0) | **Taylor** (0-2) | None | SECN+ | 1,902 | 2-5 | |
| Mar. 6 | at Louisiana–Monroe | | Warhawk Field • Monroe, LA | **W** 5-2 | **Gearing** (1-1) | Barnes (0-1) | **Taylor** (2) | | 684 | 3-5 | |
| Mar. 6 | at Louisiana–Monroe | | Warhawk Field • Monroe, LA | **L** 3-5 | Lindsay (1-1) | **Kilcrease** (0-1) | Orton (1) | | 684 | 3-6 | |
| Mar. 7 | at Louisiana–Monroe | | Warhawk Field • Monroe, LA | **L** 4-6 | Lien (2-0) | **Desandro** (1-1) | Goleman (1) | | 623 | 3-7 | |
| Mar. 12 | Stephen F. Austin | | Ben Meyer Diamond at Ray E. Didier Field • Thibodaux, LA | **W** 8-6 | **Gearing** (2-1) | Gennari (1-2) | **Taylor** (3) | | 641 | 4-7 | 1-0 |
| Mar. 13 | Stephen F. Austin | | Ben Meyer Diamond at Ray E. Didier Field • Thibodaux, LA | **W** 3-2 (10 inns) | **Balado** (1-0) | Jaco (0-1) | None | | 683 | 5-7 | 2-0 |
| Mar. 13 | Stephen F. Austin | | Ben Meyer Diamond at Ray E. Didier Field • Thibodaux, LA | **W** 2-1 | **Theriot** (1-1) | Rodriguez (0-1) | None | | 703 | 6-7 | 3-0 |
| Mar. 14 | Stephen F. Austin | | Ben Meyer Diamond at Ray E. Didier Field • Thibodaux, LA | **W** 2-1 | **Theriot** (2-1) | Cuellar (0-1) | **Taylor** (4) | | 645 | 7-7 | 4-0 |
| Mar. 16 | Louisiana | | Ben Meyer Diamond at Ray E. Didier Field • Thibodaux, LA | **L** 8-9 | Cooke (2-2) | **Theriot** (2-2) | Bradford (1) | | 733 | 7-8 | |
| Mar. 19 | at Abilene Christian | | Crutcher Scott Field • Abilene, TX | **W** 7-6 | **Balado** (2-0) | Chirpich (2-1) | **Taylor** (5) | | 196 | 8-8 | 5-0 |
| Mar. 20 | at Abilene Christian | | Crutcher Scott Field • Abilene, TX | **L** 1-4 | Cervantes (3-0) | **Kilcrease** (0-2) | None | | 200 | 8-9 | 5-1 |
| Mar. 20 | at Abilene Christian | | Crutcher Scott Field • Abilene, TX | **L** 5-6 | Riley (5-0) | **Evans** (0-1) | None | | 200 | 8-10 | 5-2 |
| Mar. 21 | at Abilene Christian | | Crutcher Scott Field • Abilene, TX | **W** 7-4 | **Heckman** (1-1) | Jackson (0-1) | None | | 221 | 9-10 | 6-2 |
| Mar. 26 | Houston Baptist | | Ben Meyer Diamond at Ray E. Didier Field • Thibodaux, LA | **L** 4-5 | Austin (2-0) | **Taylor** (0-3) | None | | 545 | 9-11 | 6-3 |
| Mar. 27 | Houston Baptist | | Ben Meyer Diamond at Ray E. Didier Field • Thibodaux, LA | **W** 2-1 | **Kilcrease** (1-2) | Coats (0-4) | **Theriot** (1) | | 671 | 10-11 | 7-3 |
| Mar. 27 | Houston Baptist | | Ben Meyer Diamond at Ray E. Didier Field • Thibodaux, LA | **W** 5-4 (12 inns) | **Saltaformaggio** (2-0) | Smitherman (0-1) | None | | 701 | 11-11 | 8-3 |
| Mar. 28 | Houston Baptist | | Ben Meyer Diamond at Ray E. Didier Field • Thibodaux, LA | **L** 2-6 | Burch (1-0) | **Heckman** (1-2) | None | | 573 | 11-12 | 8-4 |
| Mar. 30 | William Carey | | Ben Meyer Diamond at Ray E. Didier Field • Thibodaux, LA | Game postponed | | | | | | | |

April (6-11)
| Date | Opponent | Rank | Site/stadium | Score | Win | Loss | Save | TV | Attendance | Overall record | SLC Record |
|---|---|---|---|---|---|---|---|---|---|---|---|
| Apr. 1 | UT Martin | | Ben Meyer Diamond at Ray E. Didier Field • Thibodaux, LA | **W** 2-1 (11 inns) | **Taylor** (1-3) | Shunk (1-1) | None | | 577 | 12-12 | |
| Apr. 2 | UT Martin | | Ben Meyer Diamond at Ray E. Didier Field • Thibodaux, LA | **W** 7-0 | **Kilcrease** (2-2) | Cannon (4-3) | None | | 777 | 13-12 | |
| Apr. 3 | UT Martin | | Ben Meyer Diamond at Ray E. Didier Field • Thibodaux, LA | **L** 0-2 | Folks (2-2) | **Heckman** (1-3) | Hussey (1) | | 803 | 13-13 | |
| Apr. 6 | at Louisiana | | M. L. Tigue Moore Field at Russo Park • Lafayette, LA | **L** 2-3 | Menard (1-1) | **Kilcrease** (2-3) | Durke (1) | | 815 | 13-14 | |
| Apr. 9 | Texas A&M–Corpus Christi | | Ben Meyer Diamond at Ray E. Didier Field • Thibodaux, LA | **L** 3-7 (10 inns) | Ramirez (2-2) | **Theriot** (2-3) | None | | 673 | 13-15 | 8-5 |
| Apr. 9 | Texas A&M–Corpus Christi | | Ben Meyer Diamond at Ray E. Didier Field • Thibodaux, LA | **L** 1-5 | Gaddis (1-3) | **Gearing** (2-2) | None | | 627 | 13-16 | 8-6 |
| Apr. 10 | Texas A&M–Corpus Christi | | Ben Meyer Diamond at Ray E. Didier Field • Thibodaux, LA | **W** 1-0 | **Desandro** (2-1) | Shy (0-3) | **Taylor** (6) | | 793 | 14-16 | 9-6 |
| Apr. 11 | Texas A&M–Corpus Christi | | Ben Meyer Diamond at Ray E. Didier Field • Thibodaux, LA | **L** 2-12 | Moeller (2-0) | **Heckman** (1-4) | Ramirez (1) | | 787 | 14-17 | 9-7 |
| Apr. 17 | at Lamar | | Vincent–Beck Stadium • Beaumont, TX | **W** 10-3 | **Gearing** (3-2) | Olivarez (0-2) | None | | 503 | 15-17 | 10-7 |
| Apr. 17 | at Lamar | | Vincent–Beck Stadium • Beaumont, TX | **L** 2-11 | Bravo (4-1) | **Kilcrease** (2-4) | None | | 503 | 15-18 | 10-8 |
| Apr. 18 | at Lamar | | Vincent–Beck Stadium • Beaumont, TX | **W** 3-2 | **Desandro** (3-1) | Ekness (0-2) | **Taylor** (7) | | 499 | 16-18 | 11-8 |
| Apr. 18 | at Lamar | | Vincent–Beck Stadium • Beaumont, TX | **L** 2-5 | Michael (3-2) | **Heckman** (1-5) | Dallas (8) | | 499 | 16-19 | 11-9 |
| Apr. 24 | at Northwestern State Demons | | H. Alvin Brown–C. C. Stroud Field • Natchitoches, LA | **L** 3-7 | Harmon (3-2) | **Gearing** (3-3) | None | | | 16-20 | 11-10 |
| Apr. 24 | at Northwestern State | | H. Alvin Brown–C. C. Stroud Field • Natchitoches, LA | **L** 6-13 | Carver (5-3) | **Kilcrease** (2-5) | None | | 501 | 16-21 | 11-11 |
| Apr. 25 | at Northwestern State | | H. Alvin Brown–C. C. Stroud Field • Natchitoches, LA | **L** 2-3 | Michel (2-2) | **Balado** (2-1) | None | | 511 | 16-22 | 11-12 |
| Apr. 25 | at Northwestern State | | H. Alvin Brown–C. C. Stroud Field • Natchitoches, LA | **L** 1-2 | Ohnoutka (2-0) | **Mancuso** (0-1) | Makarewich (2) | | 511 | 16-23 | 11-13 |
| Apr. 30 | Incarnate Word | | Ben Meyer Diamond at Ray E. Didier Field • Thibodaux, LA | **W** 2-1 | **Gearing** (4-3) | Cassidy (1-2) | **Taylor** (8) | | 784 | 17-23 | 12-13 |

May (4–11)
| Date | Opponent | Rank | Site/stadium | Score | Win | Loss | Save | TV | Attendance | Overall record | SLC Record |
|---|---|---|---|---|---|---|---|---|---|---|---|
| May 1 | Incarnate Word | | Ben Meyer Diamond at Ray E. Didier Field • Thibodaux, LA | **L** 1-6 | Minter (1-2) | **Desandro** (3-2) | None | | 637 | 17-24 | 12-14 |
| May 1 | Incarnate Word | | Ben Meyer Diamond at Ray E. Didier Field • Thibodaux, LA | **L** 2-3 | Zavala (5-3) | **Kilcrease** (2-6) | Garza (3) | | 684 | 17-25 | 12-15 |
| May 2 | Incarnate Word | | Ben Meyer Diamond at Ray E. Didier Field • Thibodaux, LA | **W** 7-5 | **Balado** (3-1) | Garza (3-4) | **Taylor** (9) | | 777 | 18-25 | 13-15 |
| May 5 | Prairie View A&M | | Ben Meyer Diamond at Ray E. Didier Field • Thibodaux, LA | Game cancelled | | | | | | | |
| May 7 | at Southeastern Louisiana | | Pat Kenelly Diamond at Alumni Field • Hammond, LA | **W** 11-3 (10 inns) | **Balado** (4-1) | Harrington (1-1) | None | ESPN+ | 1,035 | 19-25 | 14-15 |
| May 8 | at Southeastern Louisiana | | Pat Kenelly Diamond at Alumni Field • Hammond, LA | **L** 6-7 | Flettrich (1-1) | **Kilcrease** (2-7) | Shaffer (2) | ESPN+ | 968 | 19-26 | 14-16 |
| May 8 | at Southeastern Louisiana | | Pat Kenelly Diamond at Alumni Field • Hammond, LA | **L** 4-5 | Stuprich (6-1) | **Desandro** (3-3) | Shaffer (3) | ESPN+ | 1,053 | 19-27 | 14-17 |
| May 9 | Southeastern Louisiana | | Ben Meyer Diamond at Ray E. Didier Field • Thibodaux, LA | **W** 4-2 | **Heckman** (2-5) | Kinzeler (4-3) | **Taylor** (10) | | 847 | 20-27 | 15-17 |
| May 14 | at McNeese State | | Joe Miller Ballpark • Lake Charles, LA | **L** 0-7 | Hudgens (1-2) | **Gearing** (4-4) | None | | 398 | 20-28 | 15-18 |
| May 15 | at McNeese State | | Joe Miller Ballpark • Lake Charles, LA | **L** 3-13 (7 inns) | Dion (7-4) | **Kilcrease** (2-8) | None | | 447 | 20-29 | 15-19 |
| May 15 | at McNeese State | | Joe Miller Ballpark • Lake Charles, LA | **L** 7-10 | Ellison (4-3) | **Mancuso** (0-2) | Vega (1) | | 419 | 20-30 | 15-20 |
| May 16 | at McNeese State | | Joe Miller Ballpark • Lake Charles, LA | **L** 5-6 | Abraham (3-2) | **Heckman** (2-6) | Foster (4) | | 437 | 20-31 | 15-21 |
| May 21 | Sam Houston State | | Ben Meyer Diamond at Ray E. Didier Field • Thibodaux, LA | **L** 4-11 | Davis (6-4) | **Gearing** (4-5) | Rudis (1) | | 727 | 20-32 | 15-22 |
| May 21 | Sam Houston State | | Ben Meyer Diamond at Ray E. Didier Field • Thibodaux, LA | **L** 3-16 (7 inns) | Robinson (4-1) | **Kilcrease** (2-9) | Peters (1) | | 697 | 20-33 | 15-23 |
| May 22 | Sam Houston State | | Ben Meyer Diamond at Ray E. Didier Field • Thibodaux, LA | **L** 4-5 | Atkinson (5-1) | **Desandro** (3-4) | Lusk (7) | | 642 | 20-34 | 15-24 |
| May 22 | Sam Houston State | | Ben Meyer Diamond at Ray E. Didier Field • Thibodaux, LA | **W** 5-4 (11 inns) | **Theriot** (3-3) | Wesneski (2-2) | None | | 787 | 21-34 | 16-24 |

Schedule source:

*Rankings are based on the team's current ranking in the D1Baseball poll.

== Postseason ==
=== Conference accolades ===
- Player of the Year: Colton Cowser – SHSU
- Hitter of the Year: Colton Eager – ACU
- Pitcher of the Year: Will Dion – MCNS
- Relief Pitcher of the Year: Tyler Cleveland – UCA
- Freshman of the Year: Brennan Stuprich – SELA
- Newcomer of the Year: Grayson Tatrow – ACU
- Clay Gould Coach of the Year: Rick McCarty – ACU

All Conference First Team

- Chase Kemp (LAMR)
- Nate Fisbeck (MCNS)
- Itchy Burts (TAMUCC)
- Bash Randle (ACU)
- Mitchell Dickson (ACU)
- Lee Thomas (UIW)
- Colton Cowser (SHSU)
- Colton Eager (ACU)
- Clayton Rasbeary (MCNS)
- Will Dion (MCNS)
- Brennan Stuprich (SELA)
- Will Warren (SELA)
- Tyler Cleveland (UCA)
- Anthony Quirion (LAMR)

All Conference Second Team

- Preston Faulkner (SELA)
- Daunte Stuart (NSU)
- Kasten Furr (UNO)
- Evan Keller (SELA)
- Skylar Black (SFA)
- Tre Obregon III (MCNS)
- Jack Rogers (SHSU)
- Pearce Howard (UNO)
- Grayson Tatrow (ACU)
- Chris Turpin (UNO)
- John Gaddis (TAMUCC)
- Trevin Michael (LAMR)
- Caleb Seroski (UNO)
- Jacob Burke (SELA)

All Conference Third Team

- Luke Marbach (TAMUCC)
- Salo Iza (UNO)
- Austin Cain (NICH)
- Darren Willis (UNO)
- Ryan Snell (LAMR)
- Tommy Cruz (ACU)
- Tyler Finke (SELA)
- Payton Harden (MCNS)
- Mike Williams (TAMUCC)
- Cal Carver (NSU)
- Levi David (NSU)
- Dominic Robinson (SHSU)
- Jack Dallas (LAMR)
- Brett Hammit (ACU)

All Conference Defensive Team

- Luke Marbach (TAMUCC)
- Nate Fisebeck (MCNS)
- Anthony Quirion (LAMR)
- Darren Willis (UNO)
- Gaby Cruz (SELA)
- Julian Gonzales (MCNS)
- Colton Cowser (SHSU)
- Avery George (LAMR)
- Will Dion (MCNS)
