= 2021 Stephen F. Austin Lumberjacks baseball team =

American college baseball season

2021 Stephen F. Austin Lumberjacks baseball
- Conference: Southland Conference
- Record: 20–31 (17–22 Southland)
- Head coach: Johnny Cardenas (13th season)
- Assistant coaches: Mike Haynes; Caleb Clowers
- Home stadium: Jaycees Field

2021 Southland Conference baseball standings
| | Conf. | | | | Overall |
| Team | W | | L | PCT | W | | L | PCT |
|---|---|---|---|---|---|---|---|---|
| Abilene Christian ‍†‍‍ | 25 | – | 13 | .658 | 36 | – | 21 | .632 |
| Texas A&M–Corpus Christi ‍‍‍ | 20 | – | 14 | .588 | 25 | – | 29 | .463 |
| New Orleans ‍‍‍ | 23 | – | 17 | .575 | 29 | – | 28 | .509 |
| Sam Houston State ‍‍‍ | 20 | – | 15 | .571 | 30 | – | 25 | .545 |
| Southeastern Louisiana ‍‍‍ | 22 | – | 17 | .564 | 32 | – | 24 | .571 |
| Northwestern State ‍‍‍ | 20 | – | 16 | .556 | 27 | – | 26 | .509 |
| McNeese State ‍‍‡‍^{y} | 21 | – | 18 | .538 | 32 | – | 30 | .516 |
| Lamar ‍‍‍ | 17 | – | 19 | .472 | 25 | – | 23 | .521 |
| Central Arkansas ‍‍‍ | 18 | – | 22 | .450 | 23 | – | 28 | .451 |
| Stephen F. Austin ‍‍‍ | 17 | – | 22 | .436 | 20 | – | 31 | .392 |
| Incarnate Word ‍‍‍ | 17 | – | 23 | .425 | 21 | – | 28 | .429 |
| Nicholls ‍‍‍ | 16 | – | 24 | .400 | 21 | – | 34 | .382 |
| Houston Baptist ‍‍‍ | 11 | – | 27 | .289 | 14 | – | 38 | .269 |
† – Conference champion ‡ – Tournament champion y – Invited to the NCAA tournament As of June 6, 2021; Rankings from D1Baseball

The 2021 Stephen F. Austin Lumberjacks baseball team represented Stephen F. Austin State University during the 2021 NCAA Division I baseball season. The Lumberjacks played their home games at Jaycees Field and were led by thirteenth–year head coach Johnny Cardenas. They were members of the Southland Conference. This was Stephen F. Austin's final year in the Southland as they will be moving to the Western Athletic Conference for the 2022 season.

== Preseason ==
=== Southland Conference Coaches Poll ===
The Southland Conference Coaches Poll was released on February 11, 2021, and the Lumberjacks were picked to finish eleventh in the conference with 92 votes.

Coaches poll
| Predicted finish | Team | Votes (1st place) |
| 1 | Sam Houston State | 276 (17) |
| 2 | Central Arkansas | 247 (5) |
| 3 | McNeese State | 244 (1) |
| 4 | Southeastern Louisiana | 243 (3) |
| 5 | Northwestern State | 193 |
| 6 | Texas A&M–Corpus Christi | 146 |
| 7 | Incarnate Word | 144 |
| 8 | Nicholls | 108 |
| 9 | New Orleans | 101 |
| 10 | Abilene Christian | 98 |
| 11 | Stephen F. Austin | 92 |
| 12 | Lamar | 87 |
| 13 | Houston Baptist | 49 |

=== Preseason All-Southland Team & Honors ===
==== First Team ====
- Ryan Flores (UIW, 1st Base)
- Nate Fisbeck (MCNS, 2nd Base)
- Beau Orlando (UCA, 3rd Base)
- JC Correa (LAMR, Shortstop)
- Gavin Johnson (SHSU, Catcher)
- Clayton Rasbeary (MCNS, Designated Hitter)
- Sean Arnold (UIW, Outfielder)
- Brandon Bena (HBU, Outfielder)
- Colton Cowser (SHSU, Outfielder)
- Noah Cameron (UCA, Pitcher)
- Will Dion (MCNS, Pitcher)
- Kyle Gruller (HBU, Pitcher)
- Conner Williams (UCA, Pitcher)
- Itchy Burts (TAMUCC, Utility)

==== Second Team ====
- Preston Faulkner (SELA, 1st Base)
- Logan Berlof (LAMR, 2nd Base)
- Anthony Quirion (LAMR, 3rd Base)
- Reid Bourque (MCNS, Shortstop)
- Chris Sandberg (NICH, Catcher)
- Lee Thomas (UIW, Designated Hitter)
- Josh Ragan (UCA, Outfielder)
- Jack Rogers (SHSU, Outfielder)
- Tyler Smith (NSU, Outfielder)
- John Gaddis (TAMUCC, Pitcher)
- Gavin Stone (UCA, Pitcher)
- Luke Taggart (UIW, Pitcher)
- Jeremy Rodriguez (SFA, Pitcher)
- Jake Dickerson (MCNS, Utility)

== Roster ==
2021 Stephen F. Austin Lumberjacks roster
| Pitchers: 9 Angelo Gennari – Junior; 10 Joseph Sgambelluri – Senior; 11 Tod Gauthe – Sophomore; 18 Skyler Jaco – Freshman; 19 Easton Turnage – Freshman; 21 Chandler Poell – Junior; 22 Jacob Stobart – Senior; 23 Joe Todd – Junior; 27 John Dominguez – Junior; 32 Jeremy Rodriguez – Senior; 35 Brooks Caple – Freshman; 37 Clay Kennedy – Freshman; 38 Lance Koch – Junior; 39 Pedro Cuellar – Senior; 40 Jaxon Covington – Sophomore; 42 Benny Emmons III – Freshman; 43 Harrison Lee – Sophomore; 44 Austin Roth – Sophomore; 45 Ian Siemonsma – Freshman; 47 Joe Lopez – Freshman; 53 Grant Zwald – Freshman; Grant Walters – Freshman; Utility: 8 Sean Moore – Senior; 15 Cully Mangus – Sophomore; 20 Cal Martin – Freshman | Catchers: 14 Adrian Minjares – Sophomore; 30 Skylar Black – Senior; 31 Jake Zarrello – Junior; 41 Hunter Prescher – Freshman; Infielders: 2 Kanin Dodge – Sophomore; 3 Will Long – Sophomore; 5 Garrett Goetz – Junior; 12 Chaney Dodge – Junior; 17 Jacob Evangelista – Freshman; 24 Will Cerny – Junior; 25 Drew Durst – Freshman; 26 Bryan Burgos – Sophomore; 33 Dillon Eatman – Junior; 34 Jordan Monacy – Senior; 36 Alex Gomez – Freshman; 51 Cal Campbell – Freshman; Outfielders: 1 Kyle Cullen – Junior; 4 Cameron Crawford – Junior; 6 Clayton Loranger – Sophomore; 7 Kade Clemens – Junior; 16 Martin Rodriguez – Freshman; 28 Gabe Irwin – Freshman |

=== Coaching staff ===
2021 Stephen F. Austin Lumberjacks coaching staff
- Johnny Cardenas – Head coach – 13th year
- Mike Haynes – Associate head coach/recruiting coordinator – 9th year
- Caleb Clowers – Assistant head coach/Assistant Recruiting coordinator – 6th year
- Dylan Belanger – Volunteer assistant Coach – 2nd year

== Schedule and results ==
Legend
| | Stephen F. Austin win |
| | Stephen F. Austin loss |
| | Postponement/Cancelation/Suspensions |
| **Bold** | Stephen F. Austin team member |

2021 Stephen F. Austin Lumberjacks baseball game log
Regular season (20-31)

February (2-2)
| Date | Opponent | Rank | Site/stadium | Score | Win | Loss | Save | TV | Attendance | Overall record | SLC Record |
|---|---|---|---|---|---|---|---|---|---|---|---|
| Feb. 21 | Central Michigan | | Jaycees Field • Nacogdoches, TX | Game cancelled | | | | | | | |
| Feb. 21 | Central Michigan | | Jaycees Field • Nacogdoches, TX | Game cancelled | | | | | | | |
| Feb. 22 | Central Michigan | | Jaycees Field • Nacogdoches, TX | Game cancelled | | | | | | | |
| Feb. 23 | vs. Oklahoma | | Globe Life Field • Arlington, TX | **W** 9-5 | **Emons III** (1-0) | Brooks (0-1) | None | | | 1-0 | |
| Feb. 26 | at UT Arlington | | Clay Gould Ballpark • Arlington, TX | **W** 5-2 | **Gennari** (1-0) | Novis (0-1) | **Gauthe** (1) | | 314 | 2-0 | |
| Feb. 27 | at UT Arlington | | Clay Gould Ballpark • Arlington, TX | **L** 3-5 | Bullard (2-0) | **Stobart** (0-1) | Wong (1) | | 314 | 2-1 | |
| Feb. 27 | at UT Arlington | | Clay Gould Ballpark • Arlington, TX | **L** 1-2 | Moffat (1-0) | **Todd** (0-1) | Norris (1) | | 314 | 2-2 | |

March (6-10)
| Date | Opponent | Rank | Site/stadium | Score | Win | Loss | Save | TV | Attendance | Overall record | SLC Record |
|---|---|---|---|---|---|---|---|---|---|---|---|
| Mar. 2 | at No. 13 TCU | | Lupton Stadium • Fort Worth, TX | **L** 3-9 | Meador (1-0) | **Sgambelluri** (0-1) | None | | 2,078 | 2-3 | |
| Mar. 5 | at Lamar | | Vincent–Beck Stadium • Beaumont, TX | **L** 1-4 | Bravo (1-0) | **Gennari** (1-1) | Dallas (2) | | 608 | 2-4 | |
| Mar. 6 | at Lamar | | Vincent–Beck Stadium • Beaumont, TX | **L** 1-5 | Grigsby (1-0) | **Todd** (0-2) | None | | 658 | 2-5 | |
| Mar. 7 | at Lamar | | Vincent–Beck Stadium • Beaumont, TX | **L** 2-3 | Mize (1-0) | **Poell** (0-1) | Dallas (3) | | 812 | 2-6 | |
| Mar. 12 | at Nicholls | | Ben Meyer Diamond at Ray E. Didier Field • Thibodaux, LA | **L** 6-8 | Gearing (2-1) | **Gennari** (1-2) | Taylor (3) | | 641 | 2-7 | 0-1 |
| Mar. 13 | at Nicholls | | Ben Meyer Diamond at Ray E. Didier Field • Thibodaux, LA | **L** 2-3 | Balado (1-0) | **Jaco** (0-1) | None | | 683 | 2-8 | 0-2 |
| Mar. 13 | at Nicholls | | Ben Meyer Diamond at Ray E. Didier Field • Thibodaux, LA | **L** 1-2 | Theriot (1-1) | **Rodriguez** (0-1) | None | | 703 | 2-9 | 0-3 |
| Mar. 14 | at Nicholls | | Ben Meyer Diamond at Ray E. Didier Field • Thibodaux, LA | **L** 1-2 | Theriot (2-1) | **Cuellar** (0-1) | Taylor (4) | | 645 | 2-10 | 0-4 |
| Mar. 19 | New Orleans | | Jaycees Field • Nacogdoches, TX | **L** 4-6 | Lamkin (1-1) | **Gennari** (1-3) | None | | 200 | 2-11 | 0-5 |
| Mar. 20 | New Orleans | | Jaycees Field • Nacogdoches, TX | **W** 5-4 | **Poell** (1-1) | Barthelemy (1-2) | **Gauthe** (2) | | 450 | 3-11 | 1-5 |
| Mar. 20 | New Orleans | | Jaycees Field • Nacogdoches, TX | **L** 4-8 | Seroski (3-1) | **Stobart** (0-2) | None | | 500 | 3-12 | 1-6 |
| Mar. 21 | New Orleans | | Jaycees Field • Nacogdoches, TX | **W** 5-3 | **Lee** (2-3) | Cerejo (0-1) | **Gauthe** (3) | | 278 | 4-12 | 2-6 |
| Mar. 26 | at McNeese State | | Joe Miller Ballpark • Lake Charles, LA | **W** 8-5 | **Koch** (1-0) | Reeves (1-1) | **Gauthe** (4) | | 315 | 5-12 | 3-6 |
| Mar. 27 | at McNeese State | | Joe Miller Ballpark • Lake Charles, LA | **W** 5-2 | **Todd** (1-2) | Dion (2-3) | **Poell** (1) | | 312 | 6-12 | 4-6 |
| Mar. 27 | at McNeese State | | Joe Miller Ballpark • Lake Charles, LA | **W** 4-3 | **Gauthe** (1-0) | Roliard (1-2) | **Emmons** (1) | | 348 | 7-12 | 5-6 |
| Mar. 28 | at McNeese State | | Joe Miller Ballpark • Lake Charles, LA | **W** 2-0 | **Sgambelluri** (1-1) | Vega (0-2) | **Gauthe** (5) | | 190 | 8-12 | 6-6 |

April (6-11)
| Date | Opponent | Rank | Site/stadium | Score | Win | Loss | Save | TV | Attendance | Overall record | SLC Record |
|---|---|---|---|---|---|---|---|---|---|---|---|
| Apr. 1 | Incarnate Word | | Jaycees Field • Nacogdoches, TX | **W** 14-0 (7 inns) | **Gennari** (2-2) | Rollins (1-3) | None | | 124 | 9-12 | 7-6 |
| Apr. 2 | Incarnate Word | | Jaycees Field • Nacogdoches, TX | **L** 9-15 | McElmeel (4-3) | **Stobart** (0-3) | None | | 113 | 9-13 | 7-7 |
| Apr. 2 | Incarnate Word | | Jaycees Field • Nacogdoches, TX | **W** 11-1 (7 inns) | **Todd** (2-2) | Zavala (3-1) | None | | 113 | 10-13 | 8-7 |
| Apr. 3 | Incarnate Word | | Jaycees Field • Nacogdoches, TX | **W** 11-1 (8 inns) | **Sgambelluri** (2-1) | Walker (0-2) | None | | 140 | 11-13 | 9-7 |
| Apr. 6 | Grambling State | | Jaycees Field • Nacogdoches, TX | **W** 10-8 | **Emmons** (2-0) | Rotramel (0-2) | **Gauthe** (6) | | 80 | 12-13 | |
| Apr. 7 | at No. 4 Texas | | UFCU Disch–Falk Field • Austin, TX | **L** 1-9 | Hansen (3-1) | **Stobart** (0-4) | None | LHN | 1,599 | 12-14 | |
| Apr. 13 | at No. 8 Texas Tech | | Dan Law Field at Rip Griffin Park • Lubbock, TX | **L** 3-4 | Webster (1-0) | **Lee** (1-1) | None | ESPN+ | 3,516 | 12-15 | |
| Apr. 14 | at No. 8 Texas Tech | | Dan Law Field at Rip Griffin Park • Lubbock, TX | **L** 5-7 | Riechmann (1-0) | **Roth** (0-1) | Queen (4) | ESPN+ | 2,959 | 12-16 | |
| Apr. 17 | Southeastern Louisiana | | Jaycees Field • Nacogdoches, TX | **L** 2-6 | Warren (6-1) | **Gennari** (2-3) | None | | 150 | 12-17 | 9-8 |
| Apr. 17 | Southeastern Louisiana | | Jaycees Field • Nacogdoches, TX | **L** 4-7 | Kinzeler (4-1) | **Lee** (1-2) | Hoskins (5) | | 100 | 12-18 | 9-9 |
| Apr. 18 | Southeastern Louisiana | | Jaycees Field • Nacogdoches, TX | **L** 6-9 (8 inns) | Harrington (1-0) | **Gauthe** (1-1) | Flettrich (2) | | 120 | 12-19 | 9-10 |
| Apr. 18 | Southeastern Louisiana | | Jaycees Field • Nacogdoches, TX | **L** 3-5 (7 inns) | Stuprich (4-1) | **Sgambelluri** (2-2) | None | | 120 | 12-20 | 9-11 |
| Apr. 23 | at Central Arkansas | | Bear Stadium • Conway, AR | **L** 9-10 | Cleveland (4-3) | **Koch** (1-1) | None | | 245 | 12-21 | 9-12 |
| Apr. 24 | at Central Arkansas | | Bear Stadium • Conway, AR | **W** 8-2 | **Todd** (3-2) | Moyer (2-5) | None | | 325 | 13-21 | 10-12 |
| Apr. 25 | at Central Arkansas | | Bear Stadium • Conway, AR | **L** 6-7 (7 inns) | Navarro (1-0) | **Gauthe** (1-2) | None | | 310 | 13-22 | 10-13 |
| Apr. 25 | at Central Arkansas | | Bear Stadium • Conway, AR | **L** 0-9 | Cleveland (5-3) | **Sgambelluri** (2-3) | None | | 310 | 13-23 | 10-14 |
| Apr. 30 | Sam Houston State | | Jaycees Field • Nacogdoches, TX | **W** 6-3 | **Sgambelluri** (3-3) | Davis (5-3) | **Poell** (2) | | 337 | 14-23 | 11-14 |

May (6–8)
| Date | Opponent | Rank | Site/stadium | Score | Win | Loss | Save | TV | Attendance | Overall record | SLC Record |
|---|---|---|---|---|---|---|---|---|---|---|---|
| May 1 | Sam Houston State | | Jaycees Field • Nacogdoches, TX | **W** 5-4 | **Gauthe** (2-2) | Lusk (1-2) | None | | 346 | 15-23 | 12-14 |
| May 1 | Sam Houston State | | Jaycees Field • Nacogdoches, TX | **L** 3-9 (7 inns) | Backhus (3-0) | **Gennari** (2-4) | None | | 346 | 15-24 | 12-15 |
| May 2 | Sam Houston State | | Jaycees Field • Nacogdoches, TX | Game cancelled | | | | | | | |
| May 7 | at Texas A&M–Corpus Christi | | Chapman Field • Corpus Christi, TX | **L** 1-5 | Ramirez (6-2) | **Sgambelluri** (3-4) | None | | 246 | 15-25 | 12-16 |
| May 8 | at Texas A&M–Corpus Christi | | Chapman Field • Corpus Christi, TX | **L** 2-10 (7 inns) | Gaddis (5-3) | **Todd** (3-3) | None | | 230 | 15-26 | 12-17 |
| May 8 | at Texas A&M–Corpus Christi | | Chapman Field • Corpus Christi, TX | **L** 2-5 | Thomas (3-3) | **Stobart** (0-5) | None | | 236 | 15-27 | 12-18 |
| May 9 | at Texas A&M–Corpus Christi | | Chapman Field • Corpus Christi, TX | **W** 5-3 | **Gennari** (3-4) | Miller (1-3) | **Rodriguez** (1) | | 223 | 16-27 | 13-18 |
| May 14 | Northwestern State | | Jaycees Field • Nacogdoches, TX | **W** 8-3 | **Emmons** (2-0) | Carver (6-5) | **Koch** (1) | | 185 | 17-27 | 14-18 |
| May 15 | Northwestern State | | Jaycees Field • Nacogdoches, TX | **W** 9-4 | **Lee** (2-1) | Ohnoutka (2-2) | None | | | 18-27 | 15-18 |
| May 15 | Northwestern State | | Jaycees Field • Nacogdoches, TX | **L** 4-5 | Berens (1-0) | **Mangus** (0-1) | Brown (5) | | 140 | 18-28 | 15-19 |
| May 16 | Northwestern State | | Jaycees Field • Nacogdoches, TX | **W** 7-2 | **Cuellar** (1-1) | Harmon (4-4) | None | | 210 | 19-28 | 16-19 |
| May 18 | at UT Arlington | | Clay Gould Ballpark • Arlington, TX | Game cancelled | | | | | | | |
| May 20 | at Abilene Christian | | Crutcher Scott Field • Abilene, TX | **L** 3-13 (7 inns) | Morgan (2-3) | **Stobart** (0-6) | None | | 491 | 19-29 | 16-20 |
| May 21 | at Abilene Christian | | Crutcher Scott Field • Abilene, TX | **L** 3-7 | Cervantes (7-1) | **Todd** (3-3) | Carlton (2) | | 502 | 19-30 | 16-21 |
| May 21 | at Abilene Christian | | Crutcher Scott Field • Abilene, TX | **L** 4-6 | Glaze (3-1) | **Gennari** (3-5) | Riley (8) | | 502 | 19-31 | 16-22 |
| May 22 | at Abilene Christian | | Crutcher Scott Field • Abilene, TX | **W** 9-3 | **Cuellar** (2-1) | Chirpich (6-4) | None | | 563 | 20-31 | 17-22 |

Schedule source:

*Rankings are based on the team's current ranking in the D1Baseball poll.

== Postseason ==
=== Conference accolades ===
- Player of the Year: Colton Cowser – SHSU
- Hitter of the Year: Colton Eager – ACU
- Pitcher of the Year: Will Dion – MCNS
- Relief Pitcher of the Year: Tyler Cleveland – UCA
- Freshman of the Year: Brennan Stuprich – SELA
- Newcomer of the Year: Grayson Tatrow – ACU
- Clay Gould Coach of the Year: Rick McCarty – ACU

All Conference First Team

- Chase Kemp (LAMR)
- Nate Fisbeck (MCNS)
- Itchy Burts (TAMUCC)
- Bash Randle (ACU)
- Mitchell Dickson (ACU)
- Lee Thomas (UIW)
- Colton Cowser (SHSU)
- Colton Eager (ACU)
- Clayton Rasbeary (MCNS)
- Will Dion (MCNS)
- Brennan Stuprich (SELA)
- Will Warren (SELA)
- Tyler Cleveland (UCA)
- Anthony Quirion (LAMR)

All Conference Second Team

- Preston Faulkner (SELA)
- Daunte Stuart (NSU)
- Kasten Furr (UNO)
- Evan Keller (SELA)
- Skylar Black (SFA)
- Tre Obregon III (MCNS)
- Jack Rogers (SHSU)
- Pearce Howard (UNO)
- Grayson Tatrow (ACU)
- Chris Turpin (UNO)
- John Gaddis (TAMUCC)
- Trevin Michael (LAMR)
- Caleb Seroski (UNO)
- Jacob Burke (SELA)

All Conference Third Team

- Luke Marbach (TAMUCC)
- Salo Iza (UNO)
- Austin Cain (NICH)
- Darren Willis (UNO)
- Ryan Snell (LAMR)
- Tommy Cruz (ACU)
- Tyler Finke (SELA)
- Payton Harden (MCNS)
- Mike Williams (TAMUCC)
- Cal Carver (NSU)
- Levi David (NSU)
- Dominic Robinson (SHSU)
- Jack Dallas (LAMR)
- Brett Hammit (ACU)

All Conference Defensive Team

- Luke Marbach (TAMUCC)
- Nate Fisebeck (MCNS)
- Anthony Quirion (LAMR)
- Darren Willis (UNO)
- Gaby Cruz (SELA)
- Julian Gonzales (MCNS)
- Colton Cowser (SHSU)
- Avery George (LAMR)
- Will Dion (MCNS)
