= 2021 Incarnate Word Cardinals baseball team =

American college baseball season

2021 Incarnate Word Cardinals baseball
- Conference: Southland Conference
- Record: 21–28 (17–23 Southland)
- Head coach: Ryan Shotzberger (2nd season)
- Assistant coaches: Greg Evans; Kyle Winkler
- Home stadium: Sullivan Field

2021 Southland Conference baseball standings
| | Conf. | | | | Overall |
| Team | W | | L | PCT | W | | L | PCT |
|---|---|---|---|---|---|---|---|---|
| Abilene Christian ‍†‍‍ | 25 | – | 13 | .658 | 36 | – | 21 | .632 |
| Texas A&M–Corpus Christi ‍‍‍ | 20 | – | 14 | .588 | 25 | – | 29 | .463 |
| New Orleans ‍‍‍ | 23 | – | 17 | .575 | 29 | – | 28 | .509 |
| Sam Houston State ‍‍‍ | 20 | – | 15 | .571 | 30 | – | 25 | .545 |
| Southeastern Louisiana ‍‍‍ | 22 | – | 17 | .564 | 32 | – | 24 | .571 |
| Northwestern State ‍‍‍ | 20 | – | 16 | .556 | 27 | – | 26 | .509 |
| McNeese State ‍‍‡‍^{y} | 21 | – | 18 | .538 | 32 | – | 30 | .516 |
| Lamar ‍‍‍ | 17 | – | 19 | .472 | 25 | – | 23 | .521 |
| Central Arkansas ‍‍‍ | 18 | – | 22 | .450 | 23 | – | 28 | .451 |
| Stephen F. Austin ‍‍‍ | 17 | – | 22 | .436 | 20 | – | 31 | .392 |
| Incarnate Word ‍‍‍ | 17 | – | 23 | .425 | 21 | – | 28 | .429 |
| Nicholls ‍‍‍ | 16 | – | 24 | .400 | 21 | – | 34 | .382 |
| Houston Baptist ‍‍‍ | 11 | – | 27 | .289 | 14 | – | 38 | .269 |
† – Conference champion ‡ – Tournament champion y – Invited to the NCAA tournament As of June 6, 2021; Rankings from D1Baseball

The 2021 Incarnate Word Cardinals baseball team represented the University of the Incarnate Word during the 2021 NCAA Division I baseball season. The Cardinals played their home games at Sullivan Field and were led by second–year head coach Ryan Shotzberger. They were members of the Southland Conference.

== Preseason ==
=== Southland Conference Coaches Poll ===
The Southland Conference Coaches Poll was released on February 11, 2021, and the Cardinals were picked to finish seventh in the conference with 144 votes.

Coaches poll
| Predicted finish | Team | Votes (1st place) |
| 1 | Sam Houston State | 276 (17) |
| 2 | Central Arkansas | 247 (5) |
| 3 | McNeese State | 244 (1) |
| 4 | Southeastern Louisiana | 243 (3) |
| 5 | Northwestern State | 193 |
| 6 | Texas A&M–Corpus Christi | 146 |
| 7 | Incarnate Word | 144 |
| 8 | Nicholls | 108 |
| 9 | New Orleans | 101 |
| 10 | Abilene Christian | 98 |
| 11 | Stephen F. Austin | 92 |
| 12 | Lamar | 87 |
| 13 | Houston Baptist | 49 |

=== Preseason All-Southland Team & Honors ===
==== First Team ====
- Ryan Flores (UIW, 1st Base)
- Nate Fisbeck (MCNS, 2nd Base)
- Beau Orlando (UCA, 3rd Base)
- JC Correa (LAMR, Shortstop)
- Gavin Johnson (SHSU, Catcher)
- Clayton Rasbeary (MCNS, Designated Hitter)
- Sean Arnold (UIW, Outfielder)
- Brandon Bena (HBU, Outfielder)
- Colton Cowser (SHSU, Outfielder)
- Noah Cameron (UCA, Pitcher)
- Will Dion (MCNS, Pitcher)
- Kyle Gruller (HBU, Pitcher)
- Conner Williams (UCA, Pitcher)
- Itchy Burts (TAMUCC, Utility)

==== Second Team ====
- Preston Faulkner (SELA, 1st Base)
- Logan Berlof (LAMR, 2nd Base)
- Anthony Quirion (LAMR, 3rd Base)
- Reid Bourque (MCNS, Shortstop)
- Chris Sandberg (NICH, Catcher)
- Lee Thomas (UIW, Designated Hitter)
- Josh Ragan (UCA, Outfielder)
- Jack Rogers (SHSU, Outfielder)
- Tyler Smith (NSU, Outfielder)
- John Gaddis (TAMUCC, Pitcher)
- Gavin Stone (UCA, Pitcher)
- Luke Taggart (UIW, Pitcher)
- Jeremy Rodriguez (SFA, Pitcher)
- Jake Dickerson (MCNS, Utility)

== Roster ==
2021 Incarnate Word Cardinals roster
| Pitchers: 1 Justin Anaya - Sophomore; 3 Jaren Warwick - Freshman; 12 Kayden Cassidy - Redshirt Sophomore; 15 Steve Hayward - Redshirt Sophomore; 17 Aaron Celestino - Senior; 18 Isaiah Zavala - Sophomore; 19 Michael McElmeel - Senior; 23 Luis Martinez - Sophomore; 25 Michael Garza - Junior; 27 Johnny Foral - Senior; 31 Carson Rollins - Redshirt Sophomore; 33 Bryson Walker - Freshman; 36 Larry Westall - Freshman; 37 Colin Jackson - Freshman; 38 Brandon Troxler - Redshirt Freshman; 39 Derek Saenz - Freshman; 42 Cole Beddingfield - Freshman; 43 Shea Walker - Freshman; 45 Jake Zatopek - Redshirt Junior; Utility: 35 Trey Triolo - Freshman; Catchers: 32 Trent Koerner - Senior | Infielders: 2 Grant Smith - Sophomore; 4 Ryan Guerra - Freshman; 6 Taylor Darden - Sophomore; 7 Chance Medina - Senior; 8 Zach Limas - Sophomore; 9 Shaughn Kelly - Redshirt Sophomore; 11 Walt Evans - Sophomore; 13 Ryan Flores - Senior; 16 Scott Siebenthall - Freshman; 22 Lee Thomas - Senior; 24 Devon de Leon - Freshman; 26 Kendall Achilles - Redshirt Junior; 28 Josh Lackner - Sophomore; 29 Landen Kimbro - Redshirt Senior; 30 Noah Brewer - Freshman; 40 Kaddin Mikulik - Redshirt Sophomore; 41 Ron Brown - Senior; 44 Jordan McFarland - Senior; Outfielders: 0 Braxton Gerek - Junior; 5 Ridge Rogers - Senior; 14 Jack Jalufka - Freshman; 20 Wilson Ehrhardt - Junior; 21 Drew Minter - Senior; 34 Landon Etzel - Senior; 48 Alex Bustamante - Junior; 49 Jacob Rosales - Sophomore; 50 Steven Villagran - Redshirt Sophomore |

=== Coaching staff ===
2021 Incarnate Word Cardinals coaching staff
- Ryan Shotzberger – Head Coach – 2nd year
- Greg Evans – Assistant Head Coach – 2nd year
- Kyle Winkler – Assistant Head Coach – 2nd year
- Jake Arledge – Volunteer Assistant Coach – 2nd year

== Schedule and results ==
Legend
| | Incarnate Word win |
| | Incarnate Word loss |
| | Postponement/Cancelation/Suspensions |
| **Bold** | Incarnate Word team member |

2021 Incarnate Word Cardinals baseball game log
Regular season (21–28)

February (3–0)
| Date | Opponent | Rank | Site/stadium | Score | Win | Loss | Save | TV | Attendance | Overall record | SLC Record |
|---|---|---|---|---|---|---|---|---|---|---|---|
| Feb. 19 | Oral Roberts | | Sullivan Field • San Antonio, TX | Game cancelled | | | | | | | |
| Feb. 20 | Oral Roberts | | Sullivan Field • San Antonio, TX | Game cancelled | | | | | | | |
| Feb. 21 | Oral Roberts | | Sullivan Field • San Antonio, TX | Game cancelled | | | | | | | |
| Feb. 26 | Texas Southern | | Sullivan Field • San Antonio, TX | **W** 12-1 | **Rollins** (1–0) | Fields (0–2) | **Garza** (1) | | 115 | 1-0 | |
| Feb. 27 | Texas Southern | | Sullivan Field • San Antonio, TX | **W** 16-6 | **McElmeel** (1–0) | Olguin (0–2) | None | | 115 | 2-0 | |
| Feb. 28 | Texas Southern | | Sullivan Field • San Antonio, TX | **W** 13-5 | **Zavala** (1–0) | Williams (0–2) | None | | 115 | 3-0 | |

March (7–8)
| Date | Opponent | Rank | Site/stadium | Score | Win | Loss | Save | TV | Attendance | Overall record | SLC Record |
|---|---|---|---|---|---|---|---|---|---|---|---|
| Mar. 3 | Texas A&M | | Olsen Field at Blue Bell Park • College Station, TX | **L** 4-6 | Menefee (2–1) | **Hayward** (0–1) | None | | 894 | 3-1 | |
| Mar. 10 | Houston | | Sullivan Field • San Antonio, TX | **L** 7-13 | Deese (1-1) | **Hayward** (0–2) | None | | 115 | 3-2 | |
| Mar. 12 | at Northwestern State | | H. Alvin Brown–C. C. Stroud Field • Natchitoches, LA | **L** 4-5 | Harmon (1–2) | **Rollins** (1-1) | Makarewich (1) | | 463 | 3-3 | 0–1 |
| Mar. 13 | at Northwestern State | | H. Alvin Brown–C. C. Stroud Field • Natchitoches, LA | **W** 2-1 (7 inns) | **Zavala** (2–0) | Carver (2–1) | None | | 305 | 4-3 | 1-1 |
| Mar. 13 | at Northwestern State | | H. Alvin Brown–C. C. Stroud Field • Natchitoches, LA | **W** 3-2 | **Foral** (1–0) | Michel (0–1) | None | | 305 | 5-3 | 2–1 |
| Mar. 14 | at Northwestern State | | H. Alvin Brown–C. C. Stroud Field • Natchitoches, LA | **L** 5-6 | Daigle (1–0) | **Hayward** (0–3) | None | | 427 | 5-4 | 2-2 |
| Mar. 19 | Southeastern Louisiana | | Sullivan Field • San Antonio, TX | **W** 6-5 (13 inns) | **Garza** (1–0) | Hughes (1-1) | None | | 115 | 6-4 | 3–2 |
| Mar. 20 | Southeastern Louisiana | | Sullivan Field • San Antonio, TX | **W** 5-0 (7 inns) | **Zavala** (3–0) | Warren (3–1) | None | | | 7-4 | 4–2 |
| Mar. 20 | Southeastern Louisiana | | Sullivan Field • San Antonio, TX | **L** 6-7 | Bartley (2–1) | **Foral** (1-1) | Hoskins (2) | | 115 | 7-5 | 4–3 |
| Mar. 21 | Southeastern Louisiana | | Sullivan Field • San Antonio, TX | **W** 5-3 | **Hayward** (1–3) | Stuprich (1-1) | **Garza** (2) | | 115 | 8-5 | 5–3 |
| Mar. 23 | at No. 9 Texas | | UFCU Disch–Falk Field • Austin, TX | **L** 1-10 | Quintanilla (2–0) | **Walker** (0–1) | None | | 1,538 | 8-6 | |
| Mar. 26 | Central Arkansas | | Sullivan Field • San Antonio, TX | **L** 7-12 | Haley (1–0) | **Rollins** (1–2) | Gregson (1) | | 82 | 8-7 | 5–4 |
| Mar. 27 | Central Arkansas | | Sullivan Field • San Antonio, TX | **W** 12-11 (7 inns) | **Garza** (2–0) | Verel (0–1) | None | | 115 | 9-7 | 6–4 |
| Mar. 27 | Central Arkansas | | Sullivan Field • San Antonio, TX | **W** 10-2 | **McElmeel** (2–0) | Janak (2-2) | **Hayward** (1) | | 115 | 10-7 | 7–4 |
| Mar. 28 | Central Arkansas | | Sullivan Field • San Antonio, TX | **L** 3-4 | Cleveland (3–2) | **Martinez** (0–1) | None | | 92 | 10-8 | 7–5 |

April (4–16)
| Date | Opponent | Rank | Site/stadium | Score | Win | Loss | Save | TV | Attendance | Overall record | SLC Record |
|---|---|---|---|---|---|---|---|---|---|---|---|
| Apr. 1 | at Stephen F. Austin | | Jaycees Field • Nacogdoches, TX | **L** 0-14 (7 inns) | Gennari (2-2) | **Rollins** (1–3) | None | | 124 | 10-9 | 7–6 |
| Apr. 2 | at Stephen F. Austin | | Jaycees Field • Nacogdoches, TX | **L** 1-11 (7 inns) | Todd (2-2) | **Zavala** (3–1) | None | | 116 | 10-10 | 7-7 |
| Apr. 2 | at Stephen F. Austin | | Jaycees Field • Nacogdoches, TX | **W** 15-9 | **Garza** (3–0) | Stobart (0–3) | None | | 118 | 11-10 | 8–7 |
| Apr. 3 | at Stephen F. Austin | | Jaycees Field • Nacogdoches, TX | **L** 1-11 (8 inns) | Sgambelluri (2–1) | **Walker** (0–2) | None | | 140 | 11-11 | 8-8 |
| Apr. 6 | Prairie View A&M | | Sullivan Field • San Antonio, TX | **W** 12-1 (8 inns) | **Warwick** (1–0) | Maldonado (0–3) | **Beddingfield** (1) | | 52 | 12-11 | |
| Apr. 9 | at McNeese State | | Joe Miller Ballpark • Lake Charles, LA | **L** 6-10 | Abraham (2–0) | **Zavala** (3–2) | Duplechain (1) | | 311 | 12-12 | 8–9 |
| Apr. 10 | at McNeese State | | Joe Miller Ballpark • Lake Charles, LA | **L** 1-19 (7 inns) | Dion (4–3) | **Rollins** (1–4) | None | | 429 | 12-13 | 8–10 |
| Apr. 10 | at McNeese State | | Joe Miller Ballpark • Lake Charles, LA | **L** 1-4 | Ellison (2–1) | **Garza** (3–1) | Foster (1) | | 429 | 12-14 | 8–11 |
| Apr. 11 | at McNeese State | | Joe Miller Ballpark • Lake Charles, LA | **L** 4-10 | Vega (1–3) | **Minter** (0–1) | None | | 368 | 12-15 | 8–12 |
| Apr. 13 | at Rice | | Reckling Park • Houston, TX | **L** 12-15 (10 inns) | Larzabal (1–0) | **Foral** (1–2) | None | | 1,045 | 12-16 | |
| Apr. 16 | New Orleans | | Sullivan Field • San Antonio, TX | **L** 4-5 | Erbe (1–2) | **Cassidy** (0–1) | Seroski (4) | | 64 | 12-17 | 8–13 |
| Apr. 17 | New Orleans | | Sullivan Field • San Antonio, TX | **L** 5-13 (7 inns) | Turpin (6–1) | **Garza** (3–2) | None | | | 12-18 | 8–14 |
| Apr. 17 | New Orleans | | Sullivan Field • San Antonio, TX | **L** 1-3 | Mitchell (2–1) | **Minter** (0–2) | Seroski (5) | | 102 | 12-19 | 8–15 |
| Apr. 18 | New Orleans | | Sullivan Field • San Antonio, TX | **W** 6-3 | **Zavala** (4–2) | LeBlanc (0–3) | **McElmeel** (1) | | 88 | 13-19 | 9–15 |
| Apr. 23 | at Abilene Christian | | Crutcher Scott Field • Abilene, TX | **W** 12-1 (7 inns) | **Cassidy** (1-1) | Morgan (0–3) | None | | 238 | 14-19 | 10–15 |
| Apr. 24 | at Abilene Christian | | Crutcher Scott Field • Abilene, TX | **L** 7-10 (7 inns) | Huffling (5–1) | **Garza** (3-3) | None | | 481 | 14-20 | 10–16 |
| Apr. 24 | at Abilene Christian | | Crutcher Scott Field • Abilene, TX | **L** 3-8 | Glaze (1-1) | **Westall** (0–1) | None | | 411 | 14-21 | 10–17 |
| Apr. 25 | at Abilene Christian | | Crutcher Scott Field • Abilene, TX | **L** 4-8 | Chirpich (4–3) | **Zavala** (4–3) | None | | 616 | 14-22 | 10–18 |
| Apr. 27 | at No. 3 Texas | | UFCU Disch–Falk Field • Austin, TX | **L** 3-5 | Shifflet (1–0) | **Celestino** (0–1) | Nixon (5) | | 1,610 | 14-23 | |
| Apr. 30 | at Nicholls | | Ben Meyer Diamond at Ray E. Didier Field • Thibodaux, LA | **L** 1-2 | Gearing (4–3) | **Cassidy** (1–2) | Taylor (8) | | 784 | 14-24 | 10–19 |

May (7–4)
| Date | Opponent | Rank | Site/stadium | Score | Win | Loss | Save | TV | Attendance | Overall record | SLC Record |
|---|---|---|---|---|---|---|---|---|---|---|---|
| May 1 | at Nicholls | | Ben Meyer Diamond at Ray E. Didier Field • Thibodaux, LA | **W** 6-1 | **Minter** (1–2) | Desandro (3–2) | None | | 637 | 15-24 | 11–19 |
| May 1 | at Nicholls | | Ben Meyer Diamond at Ray E. Didier Field • Thibodaux, LA | **W** 3-2 | **Zavala** (5–3) | Kilcrease (2–6) | **Garza** (3) | | 684 | 16-24 | 12–19 |
| May 2 | at Nicholls | | Ben Meyer Diamond at Ray E. Didier Field • Thibodaux, LA | **L** 5-7 | Balado (3–1) | **Garza** (3–4) | Taylor (9) | | 777 | 16-25 | 12–20 |
| May 4 | at No. 3 TCU | | Lupton Stadium • Fort Worth, TX | Game cancelled | | | | | | | |
| May 7 | Houston Baptist | | Sullivan Field • San Antonio, TX | **W** 9-4 (7 inns) | **Celestino** (1-1) | Austin (3–2) | None | | 50 | 17-25 | 13–20 |
| May 7 | Houston Baptist | | Sullivan Field • San Antonio, TX | **W** 5-4 | **Cassidy** (2-2) | Coats (2–7) | **Garza** (4) | | 94 | 18-25 | 14–20 |
| May 8 | Houston Baptist | | Sullivan Field • San Antonio, TX | **W** 5-4 | **McElmeel** (3–0) | Reitmeyer (2–3) | **Foral** (1) | | 115 | 19-25 | 15–20 |
| May 9 | Houston Baptist | | Sullivan Field • San Antonio, TX | **W** 3-2 | **Hayward** (2–3) | Zarella (0–6) | **Garza** (5) | | 92 | 20-25 | 16–20 |
| May 11 | at Baylor | | Baylor Ballpark • Waco, TX | Game cancelled | | | | | | | |
| May 18 | at UTSA | | Roadrunner Field • San Antonio, TX | Game cancelled | | | | | | | |
| May 20 | Lamar | | Sullivan Field • San Antonio, TX | **L** 0-7 (7 inns) | Michael (6–2) | **Cassidy** (2–3) | None | | 75 | 20-26 | 16–21 |
| May 20 | Lamar | | Sullivan Field • San Antonio, TX | **L** 4-13 | Mize (2–1) | **Minter** (1–3) | None | | 112 | 20-27 | 16–22 |
| May 21 | Lamar | | Sullivan Field • San Antonio, TX | **W** 6-4 | **Celestino** (2–1) | Douthit (1–3) | **Garza** (6) | | 112 | 21-27 | 17–22 |
| May 22 | Lamar | | Sullivan Field • San Antonio, TX | **L** 3-13 (7 inns) | Dallas (2-2) | **Rollins** (1–5) | Cole (1) | | 75 | 21-28 | 17–23 |

Schedule source:

*Rankings are based on the team's current ranking in the D1Baseball poll.

== Postseason ==
=== Conference accolades ===
- Player of the Year: Colton Cowser – SHSU
- Hitter of the Year: Colton Eager – ACU
- Pitcher of the Year: Will Dion – MCNS
- Relief Pitcher of the Year: Tyler Cleveland – UCA
- Freshman of the Year: Brennan Stuprich – SELA
- Newcomer of the Year: Grayson Tatrow – ACU
- Clay Gould Coach of the Year: Rick McCarty – ACU

All Conference First Team

- Chase Kemp (LAMR)
- Nate Fisbeck (MCNS)
- Itchy Burts (TAMUCC)
- Bash Randle (ACU)
- Mitchell Dickson (ACU)
- Lee Thomas (UIW)
- Colton Cowser (SHSU)
- Colton Eager (ACU)
- Clayton Rasbeary (MCNS)
- Will Dion (MCNS)
- Brennan Stuprich (SELA)
- Will Warren (SELA)
- Tyler Cleveland (UCA)
- Anthony Quirion (LAMR)

All Conference Second Team

- Preston Faulkner (SELA)
- Daunte Stuart (NSU)
- Kasten Furr (UNO)
- Evan Keller (SELA)
- Skylar Black (SFA)
- Tre Obregon III (MCNS)
- Jack Rogers (SHSU)
- Pearce Howard (UNO)
- Grayson Tatrow (ACU)
- Chris Turpin (UNO)
- John Gaddis (TAMUCC)
- Trevin Michael (LAMR)
- Caleb Seroski (UNO)
- Jacob Burke (SELA)

All Conference Third Team

- Luke Marbach (TAMUCC)
- Salo Iza (UNO)
- Austin Cain (NICH)
- Darren Willis (UNO)
- Ryan Snell (LAMR)
- Tommy Cruz (ACU)
- Tyler Finke (SELA)
- Payton Harden (MCNS)
- Mike Williams (TAMUCC)
- Cal Carver (NSU)
- Levi David (NSU)
- Dominic Robinson (SHSU)
- Jack Dallas (LAMR)
- Brett Hammit (ACU)

All Conference Defensive Team

- Luke Marbach (TAMUCC)
- Nate Fisebeck (MCNS)
- Anthony Quirion (LAMR)
- Darren Willis (UNO)
- Gaby Cruz (SELA)
- Julian Gonzales (MCNS)
- Colton Cowser (SHSU)
- Avery George (LAMR)
- Will Dion (MCNS)
