= 2021 Lamar Cardinals baseball team =

American college baseball season

2021 Lamar Cardinals baseball
- Conference: Southland Conference
- Record: 25–23 (17–19 SLC)
- Head coach: Will Davis (5th season)
- Assistant coaches: Scott Hatten; Sean Snedeker
- Home stadium: Vincent–Beck Stadium

2021 Southland Conference baseball standings
	Conf.				Overall
Team	W		L	PCT	W		L	PCT
Abilene Christian ‍†‍‍	25	–	13	.658	36	–	21	.632
Texas A&M–Corpus Christi ‍‍‍	20	–	14	.588	25	–	29	.463
New Orleans ‍‍‍	23	–	17	.575	29	–	28	.509
Sam Houston State ‍‍‍	20	–	15	.571	30	–	25	.545
Southeastern Louisiana ‍‍‍	22	–	17	.564	32	–	24	.571
Northwestern State ‍‍‍	20	–	16	.556	27	–	26	.509
McNeese State ‍‍‡‍^{y}	21	–	18	.538	32	–	30	.516
Lamar ‍‍‍	17	–	19	.472	25	–	23	.521
Central Arkansas ‍‍‍	18	–	22	.450	23	–	28	.451
Stephen F. Austin ‍‍‍	17	–	22	.436	20	–	31	.392
Incarnate Word ‍‍‍	17	–	23	.425	21	–	28	.429
Nicholls ‍‍‍	16	–	24	.400	21	–	34	.382
Houston Baptist ‍‍‍	11	–	27	.289	14	–	38	.269
† – Conference champion ‡ – Tournament champion y – Invited to the NCAA tournament As of June 6, 2021; Rankings from D1Baseball

The 2021 Lamar Cardinals baseball team represented Lamar University during the 2021 NCAA Division I baseball season. The Cardinals played their home games at Vincent–Beck Stadium and were led by fifth–year head coach Will Davis. They were members of the Southland Conference. This was Lamar's final year in the Southland as they will be moving to the Western Athletic Conference for the 2022 season.

== Preseason ==
=== Southland Conference Coaches Poll ===
The Southland Conference Coaches Poll was released on February 11, 2021, and the Cardinals were picked to finish twelfth in the conference with 87 votes.

Coaches poll
Predicted finish	Team	Votes (1st place)
1	Sam Houston State	276 (17)
2	Central Arkansas	247 (5)
3	McNeese State	244 (1)
4	Southeastern Louisiana	243 (3)
5	Northwestern State	193
6	Texas A&M–Corpus Christi	146
7	Incarnate Word	144
8	Nicholls	108
9	New Orleans	101
10	Abilene Christian	98
11	Stephen F. Austin	92
12	Lamar	87
13	Houston Baptist	49

=== Preseason All-Southland Team & Honors ===
==== First Team ====
- Ryan Flores (UIW, 1st Base)
- Nate Fisbeck (MCNS, 2nd Base)
- Beau Orlando (UCA, 3rd Base)
- JC Correa (LAMR, Shortstop)
- Gavin Johnson (SHSU, Catcher)
- Clayton Rasbeary (MCNS, Designated Hitter)
- Sean Arnold (UIW, Outfielder)
- Brandon Bena (HBU, Outfielder)
- Colton Cowser (SHSU, Outfielder)
- Noah Cameron (UCA, Pitcher)
- Will Dion (MCNS, Pitcher)
- Kyle Gruller (HBU, Pitcher)
- Conner Williams (UCA, Pitcher)
- Itchy Burts (TAMUCC, Utility)

==== Second Team ====
- Preston Faulkner (SELA, 1st Base)
- Logan Berlof (LAMR, 2nd Base)
- Anthony Quirion (LAMR, 3rd Base)
- Reid Bourque (MCNS, Shortstop)
- Chris Sandberg (NICH, Catcher)
- Lee Thomas (UIW, Designated Hitter)
- Josh Ragan (UCA, Outfielder)
- Jack Rogers (SHSU, Outfielder)
- Tyler Smith (NSU, Outfielder)
- John Gaddis (TAMUCC, Pitcher)
- Gavin Stone (UCA, Pitcher)
- Luke Taggart (UIW, Pitcher)
- Jeremy Rodriguez (SFA, Pitcher)
- Jake Dickerson (MCNS, Utility)

== Roster ==
2021 Lamar Cardinals roster
Pitchers: 8 Trevin Michael – Junior; 12 Braxton Douthit – Sophomore; 18 Max Mize – Junior; 19 Josh Ekness – Freshman; 23 Marcus Olivarez – Junior; 26 Jack Dallas – Junior; 27 Chet Jones – Sophomore; 28 Zach Bravo – Junior; 33 Daniel Cole – Sophomore; 36 Christian Grigsby – Junior; 40 Douglas Palmer – Senior; 43 Benjamin Content – Sophomore; 47 Mitchell Lee – Junior; 49 Joe Buckendorff – Sophomore; 50 Dylan Johnson – Sophomore; 51 John Altman – Junior; 52 Josh Hranicky – Sophomore; 54 Will Cox – Junior; 56 Bailey Giffen – Junior	Catchers: 7 Copper Hansen – Sophomore; 9 Ryan Snell – Sophomore; 34 Monray van der Walt – Freshman; 37 Josh Blankenship – Sophomore; Infielders: 2 Matthew McDonald – Senior; 3 Deric Lamontagne – Sophomore; 5 Daniel Altman – Freshman; 6 Zach Hoekstra – Freshman; 11 Kelby Weyler – Sophomore; 16 Anthony Quirion – Senior; 17 Chase Kemp – Junior; 21 Logan Lejeune – Junior; 31 Jose Cintron – Freshman; 35 Cameron Yadon – Freshman; Outfielders: 1 Reese Durand – Sophomore; 4 Ben MacNaughton – Sophomore; 22 Cole Girouard – Senior; 38 Tanner Wilson – Freshman; 42 Avery George – Junior; 46 Owen Sheldon – Freshman

=== Coaching staff ===
2021 lamar cardinals coaching staff
- Will Davis – Head coach – 5th year
- Scott Hatten – Associate head coach/hitting coach/recruiting coordinator – 20th year
- Sean Snedeker – Assistant head coach/pitching coach – 4th year
- Hunter Doucet – Volunteer assistant Coach – 2nd year

== Schedule and results ==
Legend
	Lamar win
	Lamar loss
	Postponement/Cancelation/Suspensions
**Bold**	Lamar team member

2021 Lamar Cardinals baseball game log
Regular season (25-21)

February (0-0)
Date	Opponent	Rank	Site/stadium	Score	Win	Loss	Save	TV	Attendance	Overall record	SLC Record
Feb. 20	at Texas–Rio Grande Valley		UTRGV Baseball Stadium • Edinburg, TX	Game cancelled							
Feb. 20	at Texas–Rio Grande Valley		UTRGV Baseball Stadium • Edinburg, TX	Game cancelled							
Feb. 21	at Texas–Rio Grande Valley		UTRGV Baseball Stadium • Edinburg, TX	Game cancelled							
Feb. 24	Rice		Vincent–Beck Stadium • Beaumont, TX	Game cancelled							
Feb. 26	Texas State		Vincent–Beck Stadium • Beaumont, TX	Game cancelled							
Feb. 27	Texas State		Vincent–Beck Stadium • Beaumont, TX	Game cancelled							
Feb. 28	Texas State		Vincent–Beck Stadium • Beaumont, TX	Game cancelled							

March (10-8)
Date	Opponent	Rank	Site/stadium	Score	Win	Loss	Save	TV	Attendance	Overall record	SLC Record
Mar. 3	Houston		Vincent–Beck Stadium • Beaumont, TX	**W** 2-0	**Douthit** (1-0)	Deese (0-1)	**Dallas** (1)		1,202	1-0	
Mar. 5	Stephen F. Austin		Vincent–Beck Stadium • Beaumont, TX	**W** 4-1	**Bravo** (1-0)	Gennari (1-1)	**Dallas** (2)		608	2-0	
Mar. 6	Stephen F. Austin		Vincent–Beck Stadium • Beaumont, TX	**W** 5-1	**Grigsby** (1-0)	Todd (0-2)	None		658	3-0	
Mar. 7	Stephen F. Austin		Vincent–Beck Stadium • Beaumont, TX	**W** 3-2	**Mize** (1-0)	Poell (0-1)	**Dallas** (3)		812	4-0	
Mar. 10	at Tarleton State		Cecil Ballow Baseball Complex • Stephenville, TX	**L** 6-10	Baley (1-0)	Douthit (1-1)	None		276	4-1	
Mar. 11	at UT Arlington		Clay Gould Ballpark • Arlington, TX	**W** 3-0	**Palmer** (1-0)	Tavera (0-2)	**Dallas** (4)		314	5-1	
Mar. 12	at UT Arlington		Clay Gould Ballpark • Arlington, TX	**W** 2-0	**Bravo** (2-0)	Bullard (2-2)	**Dallas** (5)		314	6-1	
Mar. 13	at UT Arlington		Clay Gould Ballpark • Arlington, TX	**L** 3-11	Moffat (2-0)	**Mize** (1-1)	None		314	6-2	
Mar. 14	at UT Arlington		Clay Gould Ballpark • Arlington, TX	**W** 4-0	**Johnson** (1-0)	Winquest (0-2)	**Douthit** (1)		314	7-2	
Mar. 16	at Southern		Lee–Hines Field • Baton Rouge, LA	**W** 7-5 (11 inns)	**Cole** (1-0)	Washington (0-1)	None		154	8-2	
Mar. 19	Central Arkansas		Vincent–Beck Stadium • Beaumont, TX	**W** 7-5	**Michael** (1-0)	Moyer (1-2)	**Dallas** (6)		785	9-2	1-0
Mar. 20	Central Arkansas		Vincent–Beck Stadium • Beaumont, TX	**L** 2-5	Cleveland (1-2)	**Bravo** (2-1)	None		805	9-3	1-1
Mar. 20	Central Arkansas		Vincent–Beck Stadium • Beaumont, TX	**W** 7-2	**Palmer** (2-0)	Janak (2-1)	None		805	10-3	2-1
Mar. 21	Central Arkansas		Vincent–Beck Stadium • Beaumont, TX	**L** 1-6	Cleveland (2-2)	**Johnson** (1-1)	None		658	10-4	2-2
Mar. 26	Southeastern Louisiana		Vincent–Beck Stadium • Beaumont, TX	**L** 0-3	Kinzeler (3-1)	**Michael** (1-1)	Hughes (2)		712	10-5	2-3
Mar. 27	Southeastern Louisiana		Vincent–Beck Stadium • Beaumont, TX	**L** 5-6	Warren (4-1)	**Buckendorff** (0-1)	Hoskins (3)		762	10-6	2-4
Mar. 27	Southeastern Louisiana		Vincent–Beck Stadium • Beaumont, TX	**L** 2-6	Bartley (3-1)	**Ekness** (0-1)	Flettrich (1)		652	10-7	2-5
Mar. 28	Southeastern Louisiana		Vincent–Beck Stadium • Beaumont, TX	**L** 8-9 (10 inns)	Hoskins (2-0)	**Dallas** (0-1)	Aspholm (1)		512	10-8	2-6

April (7-7)
Date	Opponent	Rank	Site/stadium	Score	Win	Loss	Save	TV	Attendance	Overall record	SLC Record
Apr. 1	at Houston Baptist		Husky Field • Houston, TX	**W** 13-3 (8 inns)	**Michael** (2-1)	Spinney (0-3)	None		200	11-8	3-6
Apr. 2	at Houston Baptist		Husky Field • Houston, TX	**L** 2-3	Coats (1-4)	**Olivarez** (0-1)	Reitmeyer (2)		400	11-9	3-7
Apr. 2	at Houston Baptist		Husky Field • Houston, TX	**W** 15-4 (8 inns)	**Grigsby** (2-0)	Zarella (0-4)	None		400	12-9	4-7
Apr. 3	at Houston Baptist		Husky Field • Houston, TX	**W** 12-0 (8 inns)	**Palmer** (3-0)	Smitherman (0-2)	None		265	13-9	5-7
Apr. 10	at Northwestern State		H. Alvin Brown–C. C. Stroud Field • Natchitoches, LA	**L** 7-11	Harmon (2-2)	**Michael** (2-2)	Brown (2)		510	13-10	5-8
Apr. 10	at Northwestern State		H. Alvin Brown–C. C. Stroud Field • Natchitoches, LA	**W** 16-4 (8 inns)	**Bravo** (3-1)	Carver (3-3)	None		510	14-10	6-8
Apr. 11	at Northwestern State		H. Alvin Brown–C. C. Stroud Field • Natchitoches, LA	**W** 3-2	**Ekness** (1-1)	David (2-3)	**Dallas** (7)			15-10	7-8
Apr. 11	at Northwestern State		H. Alvin Brown–C. C. Stroud Field • Natchitoches, LA	**L** 1-8						15-11	7-9
Apr. 17	Nicholls		Vincent–Beck Stadium • Beaumont, TX	**L** 3-10	Gearing (3-2)	**Olivarez** (0-2)	None		503	15-12	7-10
Apr. 17	Nicholls		Vincent–Beck Stadium • Beaumont, TX	**W** 11-2	**Bravo** (4-1)	Kilcrease (2-4)	None		503	16-12	8-10
Apr. 18	Nicholls		Vincent–Beck Stadium • Beaumont, TX	**L** 2-3	Desandro (3-1)	**Ekness** (0-2)	Taylor (7)		499	16-13	8-11
Apr. 18	Nicholls		Vincent–Beck Stadium • Beaumont, TX	**W** 5-2	**Michael** (3-2)	Heckman (1-5)	**Dallas** (8)		499	17-13	9-11
Apr. 23	at Sam Houston State		Don Sanders Stadium • Huntsville, TX	Game postponed							
Apr. 24	at Sam Houston State		Don Sanders Stadium • Huntsville, TX	Game postponed							
Apr. 25	at Sam Houston State		Don Sanders Stadium • Huntsville, TX	Game postponed							
Apr. 25	at Sam Houston State		Don Sanders Stadium • Huntsville, TX	Game postponed							
Apr. 30	Texas A&M–Corpus Christi		Vincent–Beck Stadium • Beaumont, TX	**L** 0-6	Gaddis (4-3)	**Douthit** (1-2)	None		565	17-14	9-12
Apr. 30	Texas A&M–Corpus Christi		Vincent–Beck Stadium • Beaumont, TX	**L** 7-11	Perez (2-3)	**Johnson** (1-2)	None		565	17-15	9-13

May (8–6)
Date	Opponent	Rank	Site/stadium	Score	Win	Loss	Save	TV	Attendance	Overall record	SLC Record
May 1	Texas A&M–Corpus Christi		Vincent–Beck Stadium • Beaumont, TX	**W** 7-3	**Bravo** (5-1)	Shy (0-4)	**Dallas** (9)		615	18-15	10-13
May 2	Texas A&M–Corpus Christi		Vincent–Beck Stadium • Beaumont, TX	**W** 6-3	**Michael** (4-2)	Thomas (2-3)	**Dallas** (10)		520	19-15	11-13
May 7	at Abilene Christian		Crutcher Scott Field • Abilene, TX	**L** 2-3	Riley (6-1)	**Olivarez** (0-3)	None		285	19-16	11-14
May 8	at Abilene Christian		Crutcher Scott Field • Abilene, TX	**L** 4-8	Cervantes (6-1)	**Johnson** (1-3)	None		391	19-17	11-15
May 8	at Abilene Christian		Crutcher Scott Field • Abilene, TX	**L** 5-10	Glaze (2-1)	**Dallas** (0-2)	None		401	19-18	11-16
May 9	at Abilene Christian		Crutcher Scott Field • Abilene, TX	**L** 5-7	Huffling (6-1)	**Ekness** (1-3)	Riley (7)		388	19-19	11-17
May 14	New Orleans		Vincent–Beck Stadium • Beaumont, TX	**W** 6-0	**Michael** (5-4)	Erbe (1-5)	None		618	20-19	12-17
May 15	New Orleans		Vincent–Beck Stadium • Beaumont, TX	**L** 0-2	Turpin (9-2)	**Bravo** (5-2)	None		724	20-20	12-18
May 15	New Orleans		Vincent–Beck Stadium • Beaumont, TX	**W** 3-2	**Dallas** (1-2)	Seroski (4-2)	None		724	21-20	13-18
May 16	New Orleans		Vincent–Beck Stadium • Beaumont, TX	**W** 6-4	**Cole** (2-0)	Khachadourian (2-1)	**Dallas** (11)		723	22-20	14-18
May 20	at Incarnate Word		Sullivan Field • San Antonio, TX	**W** 7-0	**Michael** (6-2)	Cassidy (2-3)	None		75	23-20	15-18
May 20	at Incarnate Word		Sullivan Field • San Antonio, TX	**W** 13-4	**Mize** (2-1)	Minter (1-3)	None		112	24-20	16-18
May 21	at Incarnate Word		Sullivan Field • San Antonio, TX	**L** 4-6	Celestino (2-1)	**Douthit** (1-3)	Garza (6)		112	24-21	16-19
May 22	at Incarnate Word		Sullivan Field • San Antonio, TX	**W** 13-3 (8 inns)	**Dallas** (2-2)	Rollins (1-5)	**Cole** (1)		75	25-21	17-19

Postseason (0–2)

SLC Tournament (0–2)
Date	Opponent	Seed/Rank	Site/stadium	Score	Win	Loss	Save	TV	Attendance	Overall record	Tournament record
May 26	vs. (1) Abilene Christian	(8)	Pat Kenelly Diamond at Alumni Field • Hammond, LA	**L** 1-7	Morgan (3-3)	**Michael** (6-3)	None	ESPN+	847	25-22	0-1
May 27	vs. (5) Sam Houston State	(8)	Pat Kenelly Diamond at Alumni Field • Hammond, LA	**L** 4-7	Lusk (2-3)	**Dallas** (2-3)	None		757	25-23	0-2

Schedule source:

*Rankings are based on the team's current ranking in the D1Baseball poll.

== Postseason ==
=== Conference accolades ===
- Player of the Year: Colton Cowser – SHSU
- Hitter of the Year: Colton Eager – ACU
- Pitcher of the Year: Will Dion – MCNS
- Relief Pitcher of the Year: Tyler Cleveland – UCA
- Freshman of the Year: Brennan Stuprich – SELA
- Newcomer of the Year: Grayson Tatrow – ACU
- Clay Gould Coach of the Year: Rick McCarty – ACU

All Conference First Team

- Chase Kemp (LAMR)
- Nate Fisbeck (MCNS)
- Itchy Burts (TAMUCC)
- Bash Randle (ACU)
- Mitchell Dickson (ACU)
- Lee Thomas (UIW)
- Colton Cowser (SHSU)
- Colton Eager (ACU)
- Clayton Rasbeary (MCNS)
- Will Dion (MCNS)
- Brennan Stuprich (SELA)
- Will Warren (SELA)
- Tyler Cleveland (UCA)
- Anthony Quirion (LAMR)

All Conference Second Team

- Preston Faulkner (SELA)
- Daunte Stuart (NSU)
- Kasten Furr (UNO)
- Evan Keller (SELA)
- Skylar Black (SFA)
- Tre Obregon III (MCNS)
- Jack Rogers (SHSU)
- Pearce Howard (UNO)
- Grayson Tatrow (ACU)
- Chris Turpin (UNO)
- John Gaddis (TAMUCC)
- Trevin Michael (LAMR)
- Caleb Seroski (UNO)
- Jacob Burke (SELA)

All Conference Third Team

- Luke Marbach (TAMUCC)
- Salo Iza (UNO)
- Austin Cain (NICH)
- Darren Willis (UNO)
- Ryan Snell (LAMR)
- Tommy Cruz (ACU)
- Tyler Finke (SELA)
- Payton Harden (MCNS)
- Mike Williams (TAMUCC)
- Cal Carver (NSU)
- Levi David (NSU)
- Dominic Robinson (SHSU)
- Jack Dallas (LAMR)
- Brett Hammit (ACU)

All Conference Defensive Team

- Luke Marbach (TAMUCC)
- Nate Fisebeck (MCNS)
- Anthony Quirion (LAMR)
- Darren Willis (UNO)
- Gaby Cruz (SELA)
- Julian Gonzales (MCNS)
- Colton Cowser (SHSU)
- Avery George (LAMR)
- Will Dion (MCNS)
