= 2021 McNeese State Cowboys baseball team =

Baseball team season

2021 McNeese State Cowboys baseball

Fort Worth Regional appearance Southland Conference Tournament champions
- Conference: Southland Conference
- Record: 32–30 (21–18 Southland)
- Head coach: Justin Hill (8th season)
- Assistant coaches: Nick Zaleski; Jim Ricklefsen
- Home stadium: Joe Miller Ballpark

2021 Southland Conference baseball standings
	Conf.				Overall
Team	W		L	PCT	W		L	PCT
Abilene Christian ‍†‍‍	25	–	13	.658	36	–	21	.632
Texas A&M–Corpus Christi ‍‍‍	20	–	14	.588	25	–	29	.463
New Orleans ‍‍‍	23	–	17	.575	29	–	28	.509
Sam Houston State ‍‍‍	20	–	15	.571	30	–	25	.545
Southeastern Louisiana ‍‍‍	22	–	17	.564	32	–	24	.571
Northwestern State ‍‍‍	20	–	16	.556	27	–	26	.509
McNeese State ‍‍‡‍^{y}	21	–	18	.538	32	–	30	.516
Lamar ‍‍‍	17	–	19	.472	25	–	23	.521
Central Arkansas ‍‍‍	18	–	22	.450	23	–	28	.451
Stephen F. Austin ‍‍‍	17	–	22	.436	20	–	31	.392
Incarnate Word ‍‍‍	17	–	23	.425	21	–	28	.429
Nicholls ‍‍‍	16	–	24	.400	21	–	34	.382
Houston Baptist ‍‍‍	11	–	27	.289	14	–	38	.269
† – Conference champion ‡ – Tournament champion y – Invited to the NCAA tournament As of June 6, 2021; Rankings from D1Baseball

The 2021 McNeese State Cowboys baseball team represented McNeese State University during the 2021 NCAA Division I baseball season. The Cowboys played their home games at Joe Miller Ballpark and were led by eighth–year head coach Justin Hill. They were members of the Southland Conference.

== Preseason ==
=== Southland Conference Coaches Poll ===
The Southland Conference Coaches Poll was released on February 11, 2021 and the Cowboys were picked to finish third in the conference with 244 votes and one first place vote.

Coaches poll
Predicted finish	Team	Votes (1st place)
1	Sam Houston State	276 (17)
2	Central Arkansas	247 (5)
3	McNeese State	244 (1)
4	Southeastern Louisiana	243 (3)
5	Northwestern State	193
6	Texas A&M–Corpus Christi	146
7	Incarnate Word	144
8	Nicholls	108
9	New Orleans	101
10	Abilene Christian	98
11	Stephen F. Austin	92
12	Lamar	87
13	Houston Baptist	49

=== Preseason All-Southland Team & Honors ===
==== First Team ====
- Ryan Flores (UIW, 1st Base)
- Nate Fisbeck (MCNS, 2nd Base)
- Beau Orlando (UCA, 3rd Base)
- JC Correa (LAMR, Shortstop)
- Gavin Johnson (SHSU, Catcher)
- Clayton Rasbeary (MCNS, Designated Hitter)
- Sean Arnold (UIW, Outfielder)
- Brandon Bena (HBU, Outfielder)
- Colton Cowser (SHSU, Outfielder)
- Noah Cameron (UCA, Pitcher)
- Will Dion (MCNS, Pitcher)
- Kyle Gruller (HBU, Pitcher)
- Conner Williams (UCA, Pitcher)
- Itchy Burts (TAMUCC, Utility)

==== Second Team ====
- Preston Faulkner (SELA, 1st Base)
- Logan Berlof (LAMR, 2nd Base)
- Anthony Quirion (LAMR, 3rd Base)
- Reid Bourque (MCNS, Shortstop)
- Chris Sandberg (NICH, Catcher)
- Lee Thomas (UIW, Designated Hitter)
- Josh Ragan (UCA, Outfielder)
- Jack Rogers (SHSU, Outfielder)
- Tyler Smith (NSU, Outfielder)
- John Gaddis (TAMUCC, Pitcher)
- Gavin Stone (UCA, Pitcher)
- Luke Taggart (UIW, Pitcher)
- Jeremy Rodriguez (SFA, Pitcher)
- Jake Dickerson (MCNS, Utility)

== Roster ==
2021 McNeese State Cowboys roster
Pitchers: 10 James Burchett – Redshirt Freshman; 14 Brett Payne – Redshirt Sophomore; 17 Sean-Michael Brady – Redshirt Freshman; 18 Isaac Duplechain – Redshirt Freshman; 19 Jonathan Ellison – Redshirt Senior; 20 Daniel Hecker – Redshirt Senior; 21 Cameron Meeks – Redshirt Freshman; 22 Andrew Wood – Redshirt Senior; 25 Ty Abraham – Redshirt Freshman; 28 Brad Kincaid – Redshirt Senior; 31 Zach May – Redshirt Junior; 32 Hunter Reeves – Redshirt Senior; 33 Bryson Hudgens – Redshirt Sophomore; 36 Christian Vega – Redshirt Sophomore; 37 Zach Diaz – Redshirt Junior; 40 Brody Strahan – Redshirt Junior; 41 Hayden Shaddox – Redshirt Sophomore; 43 Kevin Roliard – Redshirt Junior; 44 Chance Stone – Redshirt Sophomore; 45 JT Peloquin – Redshirt Freshman; 46 Isaiah Naylor – Freshman; 47 Will Dion – Redshirt Sophomore; 49 Grant Fontenot – Freshman; 50 Cameron Lejeune – Freshman; 99 Cameron Foster – Redshirt Junior	Catchers: 6 Tre Obregon III – Redshirt Junior; 12 Schuyler Thibodaux – Redshirt Sophomore; 13 Brett Whelton – Redshirt Senior; 38 Matt Keller – Redshirt Junior; 48 Ben David – Freshman; Infielders: 3 Nate Fisbeck – Redshirt Senior; 4 Gabve Vasquez – Redshirt Sophomore; 8 Kade Morris – Redshirt Junior; 11 Reid Bourque – Redshirt Junior; 15 Ricky Munoz – Redshirt Sophomore; 26 Jordan Yeatts – Redshirt Sophomore; Outfielders: 0 Braden Duhon – Redshirt Freshman; 1 Payton Harden – Redshirt Sophomore; 2 Cooper Hext – Freshman; 9 Carson Carpenter – Freshman; 27 Julian Gonzales – Redshirt Junior; 34 Clayton Rasbeary – Redshirt Senior; Utility: 16 Jake Dickerson – Redshirt Senior; 24 Peyton Johnson – Redshirt Sophomore; 39 Nate Collins – Redshirt Junior

=== Coaching staff ===
2021 mcneese state cowboys coaching staff
- Justin Hill – Head coach – 8th year
- Nick Zaleski – Associate head coach/Pitching coordinator – 6th year
- Jim Ricklefsen – Assistant head coach/recruiting coordinator/Alumni Relations – 6th year
- Cass Hargis – Volunteer assistant Coach – 2nd year

== Schedule and results ==
Legend
	McNeese State win
	McNeese State loss
	Postponement/Cancelation/Suspensions
**Bold**	McNeese State team member

2021 McNeese State Cowboys baseball game log
Regular season (28-28)

February (4-3)
Date	Opponent	Rank	Site/stadium	Score	Win	Loss	Save	TV	Attendance	Overall record	SLC Record
Feb. 19	at Alabama		Sewell–Thomas Stadium • Tuscaloosa, AL	**L** 6-10	Prielipp (1-0)	**Dion** (0-1)	None	SECN+	1,748	0-1	
Feb. 20	at Alabama		Sewell–Thomas Stadium • Tuscaloosa, AL	**L** 3-4	Lee (1-0)	**Roliard** (0-1)	None	SECN+	1,764	0-2	
Feb. 21	at Alabama		Sewell–Thomas Stadium • Tuscaloosa, AL	**L** 5-9	Hitt (1-0)	**Strahan** (0-1)	Guffey (1)	SECN+	1,764	0-3	
Feb. 26	Prairie View A&M		Joe Miller Ballpark • Lake Charles, LA	**W** 5-0	**Dion** (1-1)	Smith (0-1)	None		439	1-3	
Feb. 27	Prairie View A&M		Joe Miller Ballpark • Lake Charles, LA	**W** 3-1	**Abraham** (1-1)	Laux (0-1)	**Reeves** (1)		257	2-3	
Feb. 27	Prairie View A&M		Joe Miller Ballpark • Lake Charles, LA	**W** 6-5	**Roliard** (1-0)	Hardit (0-1)	None		257	3-3	
Feb. 28	Prairie View A&M		Joe Miller Ballpark • Lake Charles, LA	**W** 11-5	**Brady** (1-0)	Mendoza (0-1)	None		440	4-3	

March (8-8)
Date	Opponent	Rank	Site/stadium	Score	Win	Loss	Save	TV	Attendance	Overall record	SLC Record
Mar. 3	Louisiana		Joe Miller Ballpark • Lake Charles, LA	**W** 4-3	**Duplechain** (1-0)	Moriarty (0-1)	**Reeves**(1)		402	5-3	
Mar. 5	at Louisiana Tech		J. C. Love Field at Pat Patterson Park • Ruston, LA	**L** 0-11	Fincher (2-0)	**Dion** (1-2)	Tomkins (1)		1,000	5-4	
Mar. 6	at Louisiana Tech		J. C. Love Field at Pat Patterson Park • Ruston, LA	**L** 3-4	Griffen (1-1)	**Duplechain** (1-1)	Ouellette (2)		1,000	5-5	
Mar. 7	at Louisiana Tech		J. C. Love Field at Pat Patterson Park • Ruston, LA	**L** 4-14	Whorff (2-1)	**Vega** (0-1)	None		1,000	5-6	
Mar. 12	Texas A&M–Corpus Christi		Joe Miller Ballpark • Lake Charles, LA	**W** 4-2	**Kincaid** (1-0)	Gaddis (0-1)	**Dion** (1)		236	6-6	1-0
Mar. 13	Texas A&M–Corpus Christi		Joe Miller Ballpark • Lake Charles, LA	**W** 9-8	**Duplechain** (2-1)	Miller (0-1)	None		312	7-6	2-0
Mar. 14	Texas A&M–Corpus Christi		Joe Miller Ballpark • Lake Charles, LA	**W** 12-7	**Reeves** (1-0)	Purcell (0-1)	None		298	8-6	3-0
Mar. 16	LSU Alexandria		Joe Miller Ballpark • Lake Charles, LA	**W** 16-6	**May** (1-0)	Colligan (0-2)	None		438	9-6	
Mar. 19	at Houston Baptist		Husky Field • Houston, TX	**W** 12-6	**Duplechain** (3-1)	Zarella (0-3)	None		200	10-6	4-0
Mar. 20	at Houston Baptist		Husky Field • Houston, TX	**W** 7-1	**Dion** (2-2)	Coats (0-3)	None			11-6	5-0
Mar. 20	at Houston Baptist		Husky Field • Houston, TX	**L** 3-7	Morris (1-0)	**Foster** (0-1)	Reitmeyer (1)		400	11-7	5-1
Mar. 21	at Houston Baptist		Husky Field • Houston, TX	**W** 10-0	**Ellison** (1-0)	Tinker (0-4)	None		200	12-7	6-1
Mar. 26	Stephen F. Austin		Joe Miller Ballpark • Lake Charles, LA	**L** 5-8 (10 inns)	Koch (1-0)	**Reeves** (1-1)	Gauthe (4)		315	12-8	6-2
Mar. 27	Stephen F. Austin		Joe Miller Ballpark • Lake Charles, LA	**L** 2-5	Todd (1-2)	**Dion** (2-3)	Poell (1)		312	12-9	6-3
Mar. 27	Stephen F. Austin		Joe Miller Ballpark • Lake Charles, LA	**L** 3-4	Gauthe (1-0)	**Roliard** (1-2)	Emmons (1)		348	12-10	6-4
Mar. 28	Stephen F. Austin		Joe Miller Ballpark • Lake Charles, LA	**L** 0-2	Sgambelluri (1-1)	**Vega** (0-2)	Gauthe (5)		190	12-11	6-5

April (8-10)
Date	Opponent	Rank	Site/stadium	Score	Win	Loss	Save	TV	Attendance	Overall record	SLC Record
Apr. 1	at Southeastern Louisiana		Pat Kenelly Diamond at Alumni Field • Hammond, LA	**W** 6-4	**Roliard** (2-2)	Hughes (1-2)	None	ESPN+	918	13-11	7-5
Apr. 2	at Southeastern Louisiana		Pat Kenelly Diamond at Alumni Field • Hammond, LA	**W** 5-0	**Dion** (3-3)	Shaffer (1-2)	None	ESPN+	937	14-11	8-5
Apr. 2	Southeastern Louisiana Lions		Pat Kenelly Diamond at Alumni Field • Hammond, LA	**L** 3-6	Warren (5-1)	**Ellison** (1-1)	Hoskins (4)	ESPN+	937	14-12	8-6
Apr. 3	at Southeastern Louisiana		Pat Kenelly Diamond at Alumni Field • Hammond, LA	**L** 9-13	Stuprich (2-1)	**Meeks** (0-1)	None	ESPN+	925	14-13	8-7
Apr. 6	at LSU		Alex Box Stadium, Skip Bertman Field • Baton Rouge, LA	**L** 1-14	Edwards (1-2)	**Vega** (0-3)	None	SECN+	3,606	14-14	
Apr. 9	Incarnate Word		Joe Miller Ballpark • Lake Charles, LA	**W** 10-6	**Abraham** (2-0)	Zavala (3-2)	**Duplechain** (1)		311	15-14	9-7
Apr. 10	Incarnate Word		Joe Miller Ballpark • Lake Charles, LA	**W** 19-1 (7 inns)	**Dion** (4-3)	Rollins (1-4)	None			16-14	10-7
Apr. 10	Incarnate Word		Joe Miller Ballpark • Lake Charles, LA	**W** 4-1	**Ellison** (2-1)	Garza (3-1)	**Foster** (1)		429	17-14	11-7
Apr. 11	Incarnate Word		Joe Miller Ballpark • Lake Charles, LA	**W** 10-4	**Vega** (1-3)	Minter (0-1)	None		368	18-14	12-7
Apr. 17	at Sam Houston State		Don Sanders Stadium • Huntsville, TX	**L** 2-6	Davis (5-2)	**Hudgens** (0-1)	None		512	18-15	12-8
Apr. 18	at Sam Houston State		Don Sanders Stadium • Huntsville, TX	**L** 5-6 (14 inns)	Wesneski (1-1)	**Foster** (0-2)	None		512	18-16	12-9
Apr. 18	at Sam Houston State		Don Sanders Stadium • Huntsville, TX	**L** 4-5	Atkinson (4-1)	**Ellison** (2-2)	Beard (1)		512	18-17	12-10
Apr. 19	at Sam Houston State		Don Sanders Stadium • Huntsville, TX	**L** 4-6	Backhus (2-0)	**Vega** (1-4)	Havlicek (2)		512	18-18	12-11
Apr. 21	at Louisiana		M. L. Tigue Moore Field at Russo Park • Lafayette, LA	**L** 3-4	Burk (3-0)	**Abraham** (2-1)	Schultz (3)	ESPN+	643	18-19	
Apr. 24	UT Arlington		Joe Miller Ballpark • Lake Charles, LA	**L** 1-8	Tavera (1-4)	**Dion** (4-4)	King (1)		412	18-20	
Apr. 24	UT Arlington		Joe Miller Ballpark • Lake Charles, LA	**L** 5-6 (10 inns)	Wong (2-1)	**Brady** (1-1)	Austin (1)		377	18-21	
Apr. 25	UT Arlington		Joe Miller Ballpark • Lake Charles, LA	**W** 5-3	**Ellison** (3-2)	Moffat (3-3)	**Foster** (2)		439	19-21	
Apr. 30	New Orleans		Joe Miller Ballpark • Lake Charles, LA	**W** 8-6	**Reeves** (2-1)	Erbe (1-3)	**Foster** (3)		399	20-21	13-11

May (8–7)
Date	Opponent	Rank	Site/stadium	Score	Win	Loss	Save	TV	Attendance	Overall record	SLC Record
May 1	New Orleans		Joe Miller Ballpark • Lake Charles, LA	**W** 8-3	**Dion** (5-4)	Turpin (7-2)	None		447	21-21	14-11
May 1	New Orleans		Joe Miller Ballpark • Lake Charles, LA	**L** 4-8	Mitchell (4-1)	**Ellison** (3-3)	Seroski (8)		487	21-22	14-12
May 2	New Orleans		Joe Miller Ballpark • Lake Charles, LA	**L** 10-13	Acree (2-1)	**Abraham** (2-2)	Seroski (9)		379	21-23	14-13
May 7	at Northwestern State		H. Alvin Brown–C. C. Stroud Field • Natchitoches, LA	**W** 7-1	**Dion** (6-4)	Harmon (4-3)	None		458	22-23	15-13
May 7	at Northwestern State		H. Alvin Brown–C. C. Stroud Field • Natchitoches, LA	**L** 3-4	Carver (6-4)	**Hudgens** (0-2)	Brown (4)		458	22-24	15-14
May 8	at Northwestern State		H. Alvin Brown–C. C. Stroud Field • Natchitoches, LA	**L** 3-4	Brown (2-2)	**Foster** (0-2)	None		510	22-25	15-15
May 8	at Northwestern State		H. Alvin Brown–C. C. Stroud Field • Natchitoches, LA	**L** 5-6	Taylor (2-0)	**Vega** (1-5)	None		510	22-26	15-16
May 14	Nicholls		Joe Miller Ballpark • Lake Charles, LA	**W** 7-0	**Hudgens** (1-2)	Gearing (4-4)	None		398	23-26	16-16
May 15	Nicholls		Joe Miller Ballpark • Lake Charles, LA	**W** 13-3 (7 inns)	**Dion** (7-4)	Kilcrease (2-8)	None		447	24-26	17-16
May 15	Nicholls		Joe Miller Ballpark • Lake Charles, LA	**W** 10-7	**Ellison** (4-3)	Mancuso (0-2)	**Vega** (1)		419	25-26	18-16
May 16	Nicholls		Joe Miller Ballpark • Lake Charles, LA	**W** 6-5	**Abraham** (3-2)	Heckman (2-6)	**Foster** (4)		437	26-26	19-16
May 20	at Central Arkansas		Bear Stadium • Conway, AR	**L** 1-8	Moyer (5-6)	**Hudgens** (1-3)	None		348	26-27	19-17
May 21	at Central Arkansas		Bear Stadium • Conway, AR	**W** 6-1	**Dion** (8-4)	Williams (2-2)	None		304	27-27	20-17
May 21	at Central Arkansas		Bear Stadium • Conway, AR	**W** 6-5 (10 inns)	**Foster** (1-3)	Williams (2-3)	None		255	28-27	21-17
May 22	at Central Arkansas		Bear Stadium • Conway, AR	**L** 4-5	Gilbertson (2-3)	**Abraham** (3-3)	Verel (1)		410	28-28	21-18

Postseason (4–2)

SLC Tournament (4–0)
Date	Opponent	Seed/Rank	Site/stadium	Score	Win	Loss	Save	TV	Attendance	Overall record	Tournament record
May 26	vs. (2) New Orleans	(7)	Pat Kenelly Diamond at Alumni Field • Hammond, LA	**W** 12-0 (8 inns)	**Dion** (9-4)	Turpin (9-3)	None	ESPN+	1,262	29-28	1-0
May 27	vs. (3) Southeastern Louisiana	(7)	Pat Kenelly Diamond at Alumni Field • Hammond, LA	**W** 3-2	**Ellison** (5-3)	Stuprich (6-3)	**Foster** (3)	ESPN+	1,167	30-28	2-0
May 28	vs. (3) Southeastern Louisiana	(7)	Pat Kenelly Diamond at Alumni Field • Hammond, LA	**W** 18-2 (7 inns)	**Abraham** (4-3)	Dugas (0-1)	None	ESPN+	1,225	31-28	3-0
May 29	vs. (5) Sam Houston State	(7)	Pat Kenelly Diamond at Alumni Field • Hammond, LA	**W** 2-1	**Hudgens** (2-3)	Backhus (4-2)	**Foster** (4)	ESPN+	903	32-28	4-0

NCAA tournament (0-2)
Date	Opponent	Seed/Rank	Site/stadium	Score	Win	Loss	Save	TV	Attendance	Overall record	Tournament record
Fort Worth Regionals
Jun. 4	vs. (1)/No. 8 TCU	(4)	Lupton Stadium • Fort Worth, TX	**L** 4-12	Krob (8-1)	**Foster** (1-4)	None	ESPN3	4,468	32-29	0-1
Jun. 5	vs. (3) Oregon State	(4)	Lupton Stadium • Fort Worth, TX	**L** 5-10	Watkins (3-4)	**Foster** (1-5)	None	ESPN3	3,969	32-30	0-2

Schedule source:

*Rankings are based on the team's current ranking in the D1Baseball poll.

== Fort Worth Regional ==
Fort Worth Regional Teams
(1) TCU Horned Frogs	(2) Dallas Baptist Patriots	(3) Oregon State Beavers	(4) McNeese State Cowboys

First Round
6	TCU	12
McNeese State	4
Dallas Baptist	6
Oregon State	5
Lower round 1
McNeese State	5
Oregon State	10

Semi-Finals
6	TCU	6
Dallas Baptist	8
Lower final
6	TCU	2
Oregon State	3

Finals
Dallas Baptist
Oregon State

== Postseason ==
=== Conference accolades ===
- Player of the Year: Colton Cowser – SHSU
- Hitter of the Year: Colton Eager – ACU
- Pitcher of the Year: Will Dion – MCNS
- Relief Pitcher of the Year: Tyler Cleveland – UCA
- Freshman of the Year: Brennan Stuprich – SELA
- Newcomer of the Year: Grayson Tatrow – ACU
- Clay Gould Coach of the Year: Rick McCarty – ACU

All Conference First Team

- Chase Kemp (LAMR)
- Nate Fisbeck (MCNS)
- Itchy Burts (TAMUCC)
- Bash Randle (ACU)
- Mitchell Dickson (ACU)
- Lee Thomas (UIW)
- Colton Cowser (SHSU)
- Colton Eager (ACU)
- Clayton Rasbeary (MCNS)
- Will Dion (MCNS)
- Brennan Stuprich (SELA)
- Will Warren (SELA)
- Tyler Cleveland (UCA)
- Anthony Quirion (LAMR)

All Conference Second Team

- Preston Faulkner (SELA)
- Daunte Stuart (NSU)
- Kasten Furr (UNO)
- Evan Keller (SELA)
- Skylar Black (SFA)
- Tre Obregon III (MCNS)
- Jack Rogers (SHSU)
- Pearce Howard (UNO)
- Grayson Tatrow (ACU)
- Chris Turpin (UNO)
- John Gaddis (TAMUCC)
- Trevin Michael (LAMR)
- Caleb Seroski (UNO)
- Jacob Burke (SELA)

All Conference Third Team

- Luke Marbach (TAMUCC)
- Salo Iza (UNO)
- Austin Cain (NICH)
- Darren Willis (UNO)
- Ryan Snell (LAMR)
- Tommy Cruz (ACU)
- Tyler Finke (SELA)
- Payton Harden (MCNS)
- Mike Williams (TAMUCC)
- Cal Carver (NSU)
- Levi David (NSU)
- Dominic Robinson (SHSU)
- Jack Dallas (LAMR)
- Brett Hammit (ACU)

All Conference Defensive Team

- Luke Marbach (TAMUCC)
- Nate Fisbeck (MCNS)
- Anthony Quirion (LAMR)
- Darren Willis (UNO)
- Gaby Cruz (SELA)
- Julian Gonzales (MCNS)
- Colton Cowser (SHSU)
- Avery George (LAMR)
- Will Dion (MCNS)
