= 2021 Abilene Christian Wildcats baseball team =

American college baseball season

2021 Abilene Christian Wildcats baseball

Southland Conference Regular season champions
- Conference: Southland Conference
- Record: 36–21 (25–13 Southland)
- Head coach: Rick McCarty (3rd season)
- Assistant coaches: Craig Parry; Blaze Lambert; Marc Mumper
- Home stadium: Crutcher Scott Field

2021 Southland Conference baseball standings
| | Conf. | | | | Overall |
| Team | W | | L | PCT | W | | L | PCT |
|---|---|---|---|---|---|---|---|---|
| Abilene Christian ‍†‍‍ | 25 | – | 13 | .658 | 36 | – | 21 | .632 |
| Texas A&M–Corpus Christi ‍‍‍ | 20 | – | 14 | .588 | 25 | – | 29 | .463 |
| New Orleans ‍‍‍ | 23 | – | 17 | .575 | 29 | – | 28 | .509 |
| Sam Houston State ‍‍‍ | 20 | – | 15 | .571 | 30 | – | 25 | .545 |
| Southeastern Louisiana ‍‍‍ | 22 | – | 17 | .564 | 32 | – | 24 | .571 |
| Northwestern State ‍‍‍ | 20 | – | 16 | .556 | 27 | – | 26 | .509 |
| McNeese State ‍‍‡‍^{y} | 21 | – | 18 | .538 | 32 | – | 30 | .516 |
| Lamar ‍‍‍ | 17 | – | 19 | .472 | 25 | – | 23 | .521 |
| Central Arkansas ‍‍‍ | 18 | – | 22 | .450 | 23 | – | 28 | .451 |
| Stephen F. Austin ‍‍‍ | 17 | – | 22 | .436 | 20 | – | 31 | .392 |
| Incarnate Word ‍‍‍ | 17 | – | 23 | .425 | 21 | – | 28 | .429 |
| Nicholls ‍‍‍ | 16 | – | 24 | .400 | 21 | – | 34 | .382 |
| Houston Baptist ‍‍‍ | 11 | – | 27 | .289 | 14 | – | 38 | .269 |
† – Conference champion ‡ – Tournament champion y – Invited to the NCAA tournament As of June 6, 2021; Rankings from D1Baseball

The 2021 Abilene Christian Wildcats baseball team represented Abilene Christian University during the 2021 NCAA Division I baseball season. The Wildcats played their home games at Crutcher Scott Field and were led by third–year head coach Rick McCarty. They were members of the Southland Conference. This was Abilene Christian's final year in the Southland as they will be moving to the Western Athletic Conference for the 2022 season.

== Preseason ==
=== Southland Conference Coaches Poll ===
The Southland Conference Coaches Poll was released on February 11, 2021 and the Wildcats were picked to finish tenth in the conference with 98 votes.

Coaches poll
| Predicted finish | Team | Votes (1st place) |
| 1 | Sam Houston State | 276 (17) |
| 2 | Central Arkansas | 247 (5) |
| 3 | McNeese State | 244 (1) |
| 4 | Southeastern Louisiana | 243 (3) |
| 5 | Northwestern State | 193 |
| 6 | Texas A&M–Corpus Christi | 146 |
| 7 | Incarnate Word | 144 |
| 8 | Nicholls | 108 |
| 9 | New Orleans | 101 |
| 10 | Abilene Christian | 98 |
| 11 | Stephen F. Austin | 92 |
| 12 | Lamar | 87 |
| 13 | Houston Baptist | 49 |

== Roster ==
2021 Abilene Christian Wildcats baseball team
Players
Coaches

| # | Pos. | Name | B/T | Height | Weight | Year | Home town |
|---|---|---|---|---|---|---|---|
| 0 | RHP | Trevor Jackson | R/R | 6 ft 2 in (1.88 m) | 185 lb (84 kg) | Jr | Las Vegas, Nevada |
| 1 | INF | Sebastian Randle | R/R | 5 ft 9 in (1.75 m) | 153 lb (69 kg) | Fr | Rockwall, Texas |
| 2 | INF | Brett Hammit | R/R | 6 ft 3 in (1.91 m) | 205 lb (93 kg) | Fr | Nixa, Missouri |
| 3 | C | Mitchell Dickson | R/R | 6 ft 3 in (1.91 m) | 170 lb (77 kg) | So | Flower Mound, Texas |
| 4 | INF | Cameron Cromer | L/R | 5 ft 6 in (1.68 m) | 171 lb (78 kg) | Fr | Rowlett, Texas |
| 5 | OF | Joseph Craig | R/R | 6 ft 2 in (1.88 m) | 225 lb (102 kg) | Jr | Blanchard, Oklahoma |
| 6 | INF | Alexei Cazarin | R/R | 5 ft 9 in (1.75 m) | 173 lb (78 kg) | Jr | Frisco, Texas |
| 7 | RHP | Genner Cervantes | R/R | 6 ft 0 in (1.83 m) | 183 lb (83 kg) | Jr | Phoenix, Arizona |
| 8 | OF | Colton Eager | L/L | 6 ft 0 in (1.83 m) | 201 lb (91 kg) | Jr | North Richland Hills, Texas |
| 9 | INF | Hunter Gieser | R/R | 6 ft 4 in (1.93 m) | 225 lb (102 kg) | Jr | Burleson, Texas |
| 10 | INF | Bryson Hill | L/R | 6 ft 0 in (1.83 m) | 197 lb (89 kg) | So | Fort Worth, Texas |
| 11 | RHP | Tanner Riley | R/R | 5 ft 11 in (1.8 m) | 170 lb (77 kg) | Jr | Clyde, Texas |
| 12 | OF | Miller Ladusau | L/R | 6 ft 2 in (1.88 m) | 205 lb (93 kg) | Fr | Heath, Texas |
| 14 | RHP | Austin Glaze | R/R | 6 ft 2 in (1.88 m) | 217 lb (98 kg) | Fr | Carthage, Texas |
| 15 | LHP | Owen Cuffe | L/L | 6 ft 1 in (1.85 m) | 195 lb (88 kg) | Fr | Roseville, California |
| 16 | LHP | Adam Stephenson | L/L | 6 ft 1 in (1.85 m) | 180 lb (82 kg) | So | Southlake, Texas |
| 17 | RHP | Austin Ruesch | R/R | 6 ft 4 in (1.93 m) | 205 lb (93 kg) | Jr | Edwardsville, Illinois |
| 19 | RHP | Zach Smith | R/R | 5 ft 10 in (1.78 m) | 176 lb (80 kg) | Jr | Abilene, Texas |
| 20 | RHP | Spencer Chirpich | R/R | 6 ft 0 in (1.83 m) | 182 lb (83 kg) | Sr | Fairmont, Minnesota |
| 21 | RHP | Tyler Morgan | R/R | 5 ft 11 in (1.8 m) | 207 lb (94 kg) | Fr | Flower Mound, Texas |
| 22 | OF | Grayson Tatrow | L/R | 6 ft 4 in (1.93 m) | 200 lb (91 kg) | So | Mansfield, Texas |
| 23 | INF | Tommy Cruz | R/R | 5 ft 9 in (1.75 m) | 170 lb (77 kg) | Jr | Guayama, Puerto Rico |
| 24 | OF | Mike Brown | R/R | 6 ft 2 in (1.88 m) | 215 lb (98 kg) | Sr | Pflugerville, Texas |
| 26 | RHP | Jack Junker | R/R | 6 ft 1 in (1.85 m) | 191 lb (87 kg) | So | Bandera, Texas |
| 27 | C | Harrison Caley | R/R | 6 ft 3 in (1.91 m) | 180 lb (82 kg) | Fr | The Woodlands, Texas |
| 28 | RHP | Cinoon Bak | R/R | 6 ft 0 in (1.83 m) | 190 lb (86 kg) | Fr | Seoul, South Korea |
| 29 | RHP | Carter Sells | R/R | 6 ft 0 in (1.83 m) | 200 lb (91 kg) | So | Brentwood, Tennessee |
| 30 | C | Thomas Brannon | R/R | 5 ft 11 in (1.8 m) | 189 lb (86 kg) | Fr | Angleton, Texas |
| 32 | INF | Cal Strandt | L/R | 5 ft 9 in (1.75 m) | 166 lb (75 kg) | Fr | Frisco, Texas |
| 35 | RHP | Cade Maclin | R/R | 6 ft 2 in (1.88 m) | 165 lb (75 kg) | Fr | Argyle, Texas |
| 37 | RHP | Ben Johnson | R/R | 6 ft 1 in (1.85 m) | 181 lb (82 kg) | Fr | Southlake, Texas |
| 38 | C | Bryson Gillmore | R/R | 5 ft 10 in (1.78 m) | 165 lb (75 kg) | Fr | Cleburne, Texas |
| 39 | LHP | Connor Carlton | L/L | 6 ft 3 in (1.91 m) | 245 lb (111 kg) | So | Abilene, Texas |
| 40 | INF | Jack Nielsen | R/R | 6 ft 3 in (1.91 m) | 210 lb (95 kg) | Fr | Southlake, Texas |
| 43 | LHP | Nick Norton | L/L | 5 ft 9 in (1.75 m) | 195 lb (88 kg) | So | Tyler, Texas |
| 44 | INF | Eric Wimpee | L/L | 6 ft 5 in (1.96 m) | 207 lb (94 kg) | Sr | Rockwall, Texas |
| 45 | LHP | Max Huffling | L/L | 6 ft 9 in (2.06 m) | 260 lb (118 kg) | Fr | Edmond, Oklahoma |

Head coach

Rick McCarty (Delta State)

Assistant coach(es)

Craig Parry (American Public)
Blaze Lambert (Palm Beach Atlantic)
Marc Mumper (Missouri)

Legend

- (C) Team captain
- (S) Suspended
- (I) Ineligible
- Injured
- Current redshirt

Roster
Last update: 2021 June 14

== Schedule and results ==
Legend
| | Abilene Christian win |
| | Abilene Christian loss |
| | Postponement/Cancelation/Suspensions |
| **Bold** | Abilene Christian team member |

2021 Abilene Christian Wildcats baseball game log
Regular season (34-19)

February (5-2)
| Date | Opponent | Rank | Site/stadium | Score | Win | Loss | Save | TV | Attendance | Overall record | SLC Record |
|---|---|---|---|---|---|---|---|---|---|---|---|
| Feb. 20 | Tarleton State | | Crutcher Scott Field • Abilene, TX | **W** 16-3 (7 inns) | **Chirpich** (1-0) | Pinedo (0-1) | None | | 367 | 1-0 | |
| Feb. 20 | Tarleton State | | Crutcher Scott Field • Abilene, TX | **W** 7-2 | **Cervantes** (1-0) | Gagnon (0-1) | None | | 367 | 2-0 | |
| Feb. 21 | at Tarleton State | | Cecil Ballow Baseball Complex • Stephenville, TX | **L** 4-10 | Poe (1-0) | **Stephenson** (0-1) | None | | 322 | 2-1 | |
| Feb. 23 | at Texas A&M | | Olsen Field at Blue Bell Park • College Station, TX | **W** 6-5 | **Riley** (1-0) | Menefee (0-1) | None | SECN+ | 1,287 | 3-1 | |
| Feb. 26 | New Mexico State | | Crutcher Scott Field • Abilene, TX | **W** 8-7 | **Riley** (2-0) | Laukkanen (0-1) | None | | 239 | 4-1 | |
| Feb. 27 | New Mexico State | | Crutcher Scott Field • Abilene, TX | **W** 15-9 | **Huffing** (1-0) | Rodriguez (0-1) | None | | 301 | 5-1 | |
| Feb. 28 | New Mexico State | | Crutcher Scott Field • Abilene, TX | **L** 2-12 (7 inns) | Jefferson (1-0) | **Stephenson** (0-2) | None | | 215 | 5-2 | |

March (10-6)
| Date | Opponent | Rank | Site/stadium | Score | Win | Loss | Save | TV | Attendance | Overall record | SLC Record |
|---|---|---|---|---|---|---|---|---|---|---|---|
| Mar. 2 | at UT Arlington | | Clay Gould Ballpark • Arlington, TX | **L** 2-3 (12 inns) | Norris (1-1) | **Sells** (0-1) | None | | 314 | 5-3 | |
| Mar. 5 | Arkansas State | | Crutcher Scott Field • Abilene, TX | **W** 26-3 | **Chirpich** (2-0) | Jarrard (0-1) | None | | 143 | 6-3 | |
| Mar. 6 | Arkansas State | | Crutcher Scott Field • Abilene, TX | **W** 6-5 (10 inns) | **Riley** (3-0) | Stone (0-1) | None | | 228 | 7-3 | |
| Mar. 7 | Arkansas State | | Crutcher Scott Field • Abilene, TX | **W** 9-4 | **Huffling** (2-0) | Anderson (0-1) | None | | 238 | 8-3 | |
| Mar. 12 | at Central Arkansas | | Bear Stadium • Conway, AR | **W** 9-8 (11 inns) | **Riley** (4-0) | Cleveland (0-2) | None | | 265 | 9-3 | 1-0 |
| Mar. 13 | at Central Arkansas | | Bear Stadium • Conway, AR | **W** 5-4 | **Cervantes** (2-0) | Johnston (1-2) | **Huffing** (1) | | 274 | 10-3 | 2-0 |
| Mar. 13 | at Central Arkansas | | Bear Stadium • Conway, AR | **L** 3-6 | Janak (2-0) | **Stephenson** (0-3) | Cleveland (3) | | 232 | 10-4 | 2-1 |
| Mar. 14 | at Central Arkansas | | Bear Stadium • Conway, AR | **L** 8-9 | Gilbertson (1-0) | **Morgan** (0-1) | Cleveland (4) | | 284 | 10-5 | 2-2 |
| Mar. 19 | Nicholls | | Crutcher Scott Field • Abilene, TX | **L** 6-7 | Balado (2-0) | **Chirpich** (2-1) | Taylor (5) | | 196 | 10-6 | 2-3 |
| Mar. 20 | Nicholls | | Crutcher Scott Field • Abilene, TX | **W** 4-1 | **Cervantes** (3-0) | Kilcrease (0-2) | None | | 200 | 11-6 | 3-3 |
| Mar. 20 | Nicholls | | Crutcher Scott Field • Abilene, TX | **W** 6-5 | **Riley** (5-0) | Evans (0-1) | None | | 200 | 12-6 | 4-3 |
| Mar. 21 | Nicholls | | Crutcher Scott Field • Abilene, TX | **L** 4-7 | Heckman (1-1) | **Jackson** (0-1) | None | | 221 | 12-7 | 4-4 |
| Mar. 26 | at New Orleans | | Maestri Field at Privateer Park • New Orleans, LA | **W** 9-6 | **Huffling** (3-0) | Turpin (3-1) | **Riley** (1) | | 316 | 13-7 | 5-4 |
| Mar. 27 | at New Orleans | | Maestri Field at Privateer Park • New Orleans, LA | **W** 19-10 | **Cervantes** (4-0) | Barthelemy (1-2) | None | | 286 | 14-7 | 6-4 |
| Mar. 27 | at New Orleans | | Maestri Field at Privateer Park • New Orleans, LA | **L** 4-8 | Seroski (4-1) | **Glaze** (0-1) | None | | 286 | 14-8 | 6-5 |
| Mar. 28 | at New Orleans | | Maestri Field at Privateer Park • New Orleans, LA | **W** 16-12 | **Chirpich** (3-1) | LeBlanc (0-1) | None | | 207 | 15-8 | 7-5 |

April (8-9)
| Date | Opponent | Rank | Site/stadium | Score | Win | Loss | Save | TV | Attendance | Overall record | SLC Record |
|---|---|---|---|---|---|---|---|---|---|---|---|
| Apr. 1 | Northwestern State | | Crutcher Scott Field • Abilene, TX | **L** 2-8 (12 inns) | Brown (1-1) | **Riley** (5-1) | None | | 231 | 15-9 | 7-6 |
| Apr. 2 | Northwestern State | | Crutcher Scott Field • Abilene, TX | **W** 11-0 | **Cervantes** (5-0) | Carver (3-2) | None | | 242 | 16-9 | 8-6 |
| Apr. 2 | Northwestern State | | Crutcher Scott Field • Abilene, TX | **W** 3-5 | David (2-2) | **Stephenson** (0-4) | None | | 286 | 16-10 | 8-7 |
| Apr. 3 | Northwestern State | | Crutcher Scott Field • Abilene, TX | **L** 5-6 (10 inns) | Taylor (1-0) | **Carlton** (0-1) | None | | 298 | 16-11 | 8-8 |
| Apr. 9 | at Southeastern Louisiana | | Pat Kenelly Diamond at Alumni Field • Hammond, LA | **W** 13-9 | **Carlton** (1-1) | Flettrich (0-1) | **Riley** (2) | ESPN+ | 765 | 17-11 | 9-8 |
| Apr. 10 | at Southeastern Louisiana | | Pat Kenelly Diamond at Alumni Field • Hammond, LA | **L** 3-8 | Shaffer (2-2) | **Cervantes** (5-1) | Dugas (1) | ESPN+ | 800 | 17-12 | 9-9 |
| Apr. 10 | at Southeastern Louisiana | | Pat Kenelly Diamond at Alumni Field • Hammond, LA | **W** 8-4 | **Jackson** (1-1) | Hughes (1-3) | **Riley** (3) | ESPN+ | 825 | 18-12 | 10-9 |
| Apr. 11 | at Southeastern Louisiana | | Pat Kenelly Diamond at Alumni Field • Hammond, LA | **L** 0-7 | Stuprich (3-1) | **Chirpich** (3-2) | None | ESPN+ | 832 | 18-13 | 10-10 |
| Apr. 13 | UT Arlington | | Crutcher Scott Field • Abilene, TX | **W** 11-10 | **Huffling** (4-0) | Winquest (0-4) | **Riley** (4) | | 204 | 19-13 | |
| Apr. 16 | at No. 3 Texas | | UFCU Disch–Falk Field • Austin, TX | **L** 0-18 | Madden (5-1) | **Morgan** (0-2) | None | LHN | 1,737 | 19-14 | |
| Apr. 17 | at No. 3 Texas | | UFCU Disch–Falk Field • Austin, TX | **L** 1-3 | Stevens (6-1) | **Huffling** (4-1) | Witt (2) | LHN | 1,959 | 19-15 | |
| Apr. 18 | at No. 3 Texas | | UFCU Disch–Falk Field • Austin, TX | **L** 1-11 (7 inns) | Kubichek (5-2) | **Chirpich** (3-3) | None | LHN | 1,826 | 19-16 | |
| Apr. 23 | Incarnate Word | | Crutcher Scott Field • Abilene, TX | **L** 1-12 (7 inns) | Cassidy (1-1) | **Morgan** (0-3) | None | | 238 | 19-17 | 10-11 |
| Apr. 24 | Incarnate Word | | Crutcher Scott Field • Abilene, TX | **W** 10-7 | **Huffling** (5-1) | Garza (3-3) | None | | 481 | 20-17 | 11-11 |
| Apr. 24 | Incarnate Word | | Crutcher Scott Field • Abilene, TX | **W** 8-3 | **Glaze** (1-1) | Westall (0-1) | None | | 411 | 21-17 | 12-11 |
| Apr. 25 | Incarnate Word | | Crutcher Scott Field • Abilene, TX | **W** 8-4 | **Chirpich** (4-3) | Zavala (4-3) | None | | 616 | 22-17 | 13-11 |
| Apr. 30 | at Houston Baptist | | Husky Field • Houston, TX | **W** 5-2 | **Stephenson** (1-4) | Burch (2-3) | **Riley** (5) | | 200 | 23-17 | 14-11 |

May (11–2)
| Date | Opponent | Rank | Site/stadium | Score | Win | Loss | Save | TV | Attendance | Overall record | SLC Record |
|---|---|---|---|---|---|---|---|---|---|---|---|
| May 1 | at Houston Baptist | | Husky Field • Houston, TX | Game cancelled | | | | | | | |
| May 1 | at Houston Baptist | | Husky Field • Houston, TX | Game cancelled | | | | | | | |
| May 2 | at Houston Baptist | | Husky Field • Houston, TX | **W** 8-6 | **Chirpich** (5-3) | Reitmeyer (2-2) | **Riley** (6) | | 200 | 24-17 | 15-11 |
| May 7 | Lamar | | Crutcher Scott Field • Abilene, TX | **W** 3-2 | **Riley** (6-1) | Olivarez (0-3) | None | | 285 | 25-17 | 16-11 |
| May 8 | Lamar | | Crutcher Scott Field • Abilene, TX | **W** 8-4 | **Cervantes** (6-1) | Johnson (1-3) | None | | 391 | 26-17 | 17-11 |
| May 8 | Lamar | | Crutcher Scott Field • Abilene, TX | **W** 10-5 | **Glaze** (2-1) | Dallas (0-2) | None | | 401 | 27-17 | 18-11 |
| May 9 | Lamar | | Crutcher Scott Field • Abilene, TX | **W** 7-5 | **Huffling** (6-1) | Ekness (1-3) | **Riley** (7) | | 388 | 28-17 | 19-11 |
| May 14 | at Sam Houston State | | Don Sanders Stadium • Huntsville, TX | **W** 10-1 | **Morgan** (1-3) | Davis (5-4) | None | | 462 | 29-17 | 20-11 |
| May 15 | at Sam Houston State | | Don Sanders Stadium • Huntsville, TX | **W** 12-6 | **Huffling** (7-1) | Lusk (1-3) | None | | 462 | 30-17 | 21-11 |
| May 15 | at Sam Houston State | | Don Sanders Stadium • Hunstville, TX | **L** 4-5 (10 inns) | Havlicek (2-1) | **Riley** (6-2) | None | | 462 | 30-18 | 21-12 |
| May 16 | at Sam Houston State | | Don Sanders Stadium • Huntsville, TX | **W** 5-3 | **Chirpich** (6-3) | Backhus (4-1) | **Carlton** (1) | | 372 | 31-18 | 22-12 |
| May 20 | Stephen F. Austin | | Crutcher Scott Field • Abilene, TX | **W** 13-3 (7 inns) | **Morgan** (2-3) | Stobart (0-6) | None | | 491 | 32-18 | 23-12 |
| May 21 | Stephen F. Austin | | Crutcher Scott Field • Abilene, TX | **W** 7-3 | **Cervantes** (7-1) | Todd (3-3) | **Carlton** (2) | | 502 | 33-18 | 24-12 |
| May 21 | Stephen F. Austin | | Crutcher Scott Field • Abilene, TX | **W** 6-4 | **Glaze** (3-1) | Gennari (3-5) | **Riley** (8) | | 502 | 34-18 | 25-12 |
| May 22 | Stephen F. Austin | | Crutcher Scott Field • Abilene, TX | **L** 3-9 | Cuellar (2-1) | **Chirpich** (6-4) | None | | 563 | 34-19 | 25-13 |

Postseason (2–2)

SLC Tournament (2–2)
| Date | Opponent | Seed/Rank | Site/stadium | Score | Win | Loss | Save | TV | Attendance | Overall record | Tournament record |
|---|---|---|---|---|---|---|---|---|---|---|---|
| May 26 | vs. (8) Lamar | (1) | Pat Kenelly Diamond at Alumni Field • Hammond, LA | **W** 7-1 | **Morgan** (3-3) | Michael (6-3) | None | ESPN+ | 847 | 35-19 | 1-0 |
| May 27 | vs. (4) Texas A&M–Corpus Christi | (1) | Pat Kenelly Diamond at Alumni Field • Hammond, LA | **W** 4-3 | **Glaze** (4-1) | Perez (2-4) | **Riley** (9) | ESPN+ | 976 | 36-19 | 2-0 |
| May 28 | vs. (5) Sam Houston State | (1) | Pat Kenelly Diamond at Alumni Field • Hammond, LA | **L** 12-14 | Dillard (2-4) | **Cervantes** (7-2) | Lusk (8) | ESPN+ | 968 | 36-20 | 2-1 |
| May 29 | vs. (5) Sam Houston State | (1) | Pat Kenelly Diamond at Alumni Field • Hammond, LA | **L** 13-15 | Beard (1-2) | **Chirpich** (6-5) | Lusk (9) | ESPN+ | 817 | 36-21 | 2-2 |

Schedule source:

*Rankings are based on the team's current ranking in the D1Baseball poll.

== Postseason ==
=== Conference accolades ===
- Player of the Year: Colton Cowser – SHSU
- Hitter of the Year: Colton Eager – ACU
- Pitcher of the Year: Will Dion – MCNS
- Relief Pitcher of the Year: Tyler Cleveland – UCA
- Freshman of the Year: Brennan Stuprich – SELA
- Newcomer of the Year: Grayson Tatrow – ACU
- Clay Gould Coach of the Year: Rick McCarty – ACU

All Conference First Team

- Chase Kemp (LAMR)
- Nate Fisbeck (MCNS)
- Itchy Burts (TAMUCC)
- Bash Randle (ACU)
- Mitchell Dickson (ACU)
- Lee Thomas (UIW)
- Colton Cowser (SHSU)
- Colton Eager (ACU)
- Clayton Rasbeary (MCNS)
- Will Dion (MCNS)
- Brennan Stuprich (SELA)
- Will Warren (SELA)
- Tyler Cleveland (UCA)
- Anthony Quirion (LAMR)

All Conference Second Team

- Preston Faulkner (SELA)
- Daunte Stuart (NSU)
- Kasten Furr (UNO)
- Evan Keller (SELA)
- Skylar Black (SFA)
- Tre Obregon III (MCNS)
- Jack Rogers (SHSU)
- Pearce Howard (UNO)
- Grayson Tatrow (ACU)
- Chris Turpin (UNO)
- John Gaddis (TAMUCC)
- Trevin Michael (LAMR)
- Caleb Seroski (UNO)
- Jacob Burke (SELA)

All Conference Third Team

- Luke Marbach (TAMUCC)
- Salo Iza (UNO)
- Austin Cain (NICH)
- Darren Willis (UNO)
- Ryan Snell (LAMR)
- Tommy Cruz (ACU)
- Tyler Finke (SELA)
- Payton Harden (MCNS)
- Mike Williams (TAMUCC)
- Cal Carver (NSU)
- Levi David (NSU)
- Dominic Robinson (SHSU)
- Jack Dallas (LAMR)
- Brett Hammit (ACU)

All Conference Defensive Team

- Luke Marbach (TAMUCC)
- Nate Fisebeck (MCNS)
- Anthony Quirion (LAMR)
- Darren Willis (UNO)
- Gaby Cruz (SELA)
- Julian Gonzales (MCNS)
- Colton Cowser (SHSU)
- Avery George (LAMR)
- Will Dion (MCNS)
