= Seth Thibodeaux =

American baseball player and coach

Current position
- Title: Assistant coach
- Team: Louisiana
- Conference: Sun Belt

Biographical details
- Born: 1980 (age 45–46); Church Point, Louisiana, U.S.

Playing career
- 1999–2000: LSU Eunice
- 2001–2002: William Carey
- Position: Catcher

Coaching career (HC unless noted)
- 2003–2005: Pearl River CC (asst)
- 2006–2007: Southeastern Louisiana (C/OF)
- 2008–2010: Nicholls State (asst)
- 2011–2021: Nicholls
- 2022–present: Louisiana (asst)

Head coaching record
- Overall: 287–290–1
- Tournaments: Southland: 4–8; NCAA: 0–0

Accomplishments and honors

Awards
- Southland Coach of the Year (2014)

Seth Thibodeaux (born 1980) is an American baseball coach and former catcher. He currently is assistant coach for the Louisiana Ragin Cajuns. He played college baseball at LSU Eunice from 1999 to 2000 before transferring to William Carey, where he played for coach Bobby Halford from 2001 to 2002. He then served as the head coach of the Nicholls Colonels (2011–2021).

== Coaching career ==
On August 1, 2007, Thibodeaux was named an assistant coach at Nicholls State.

On August 18, 2010, Thibodeaux was promoted to head coach for the 2011 season. On June 3, 2021, Thibodeaux resigned as the head coach of Nicholls. On June 8, 2021, Thibodeaux joined the Louisiana Ragin Cajuns as assistant coach, under head coach Matt Deggs.

== Head coaching record ==
Below is a table of Thibodeaux's yearly records as an NCAA head baseball coach.

Record table
Season	Team	Overall	Conference	Standing	Postseason
Nicholls (State) Colonels (Southland Conference) (2011–2021)
2011	Nicholls State	28–29	15–18	T-8th	Southland Tournament
2012	Nicholls State	26–28	13–19	11th	
2011	Nicholls State	26–29	9–18	9th	
2014	Nicholls State	32–26	21–9	2nd	Southland Tournament
2015	Nicholls State	34–19–1	18–11	3rd	Southland Tournament
2016	Nicholls State	26–30	14–16	9th	
2017	Nicholls State	29–27	15–15	9th	
2018	Nicholls State	28–32	14–16	T-7th	Southland Tournament
2019	Nicholls	27–28	13–17	T-9th	
2020	Nicholls	10–8	1–2		Season canceled due to COVID-19
2021	Nicholls	21–34	16–24	12th	
Nicholls:		287–290–1	149–165		
Total:		287–290–1			
National champion Postseason invitational champion Conference regular season champion Conference regular season and conference tournament champion Division regular season champion Division regular season and conference tournament champion Conference tournament champion
