= Rick McCarty =

American college baseball coach (born 1979)

Current position
- Title: Head coach
- Team: Abilene Christian
- Conference: WAC
- Record: 201–156

Biographical details
- Born: November 2, 1979 (age 46); Campbellsville, Kentucky, U.S.
- Education: Murray State University; Delta State University

Playing career
- 1999–2000: John A. Logan College
- 2001–2002: Murray State
- Position: Pitcher

Coaching career (HC unless noted)
- 2003: Murray State (GA)
- 2004–2008: Delta State (Asst.)
- 2009–2010: Southeast Missouri State (Asst.)
- 2011–2014: Campbell (Asst.)
- 2015: Louisiana Tech (Asst.)
- 2016–2018: Dallas Baptist (Asst.)
- 2019–present: Abilene Christian

Head coaching record
- Overall: 201–156
- Tournaments: NCAA: 0–0

Accomplishments and honors

Championships
- Southland Conference Regular Season (2021); WAC Regular Season (2025)

Awards
- Second Team All-OVC (2001)

Rick Lee McCarty (born November 2, 1979) is an American college baseball coach, currently serving as head coach of the Abilene Christian Wildcats baseball team. McCarty played baseball for the Murray State Racers baseball team and John A. Logan College while obtaining a degree. He achieved his master's degree while coaching for the Delta State University baseball team.

== Playing career ==
McCarty began his college baseball career at John A. Logan College during the 1999 and 2000 seasons. McCarty's play at Logan earned him a scholarship offer to Murray State University. In 2001, McCarty tied the school record with 8 saves. He was named Second Team All-Ohio Valley Conference that same season.

== Coaching career ==
After spending a season as a student assistant while wrapping up his undergraduate degree at Murray State, McCarty became a graduate assistant at Delta State University in 2004.

On June 12, 2018, McCarty was named the new head coach of the Abilene Christian Wildcats baseball team beginning the 2019 season.

== Head coaching record ==
Record table
Season	Team	Overall	Conference	Standing	Postseason
Abilene Christian Wildcats (Southland Conference) (2019–2021)
2019	Abilene Christian	26–26	13–17	T-9th	
2020	Abilene Christian	7–8	1–2		Season canceled due to COVID-19
2021	Abilene Christian	36–21	25–13	1st	Southland Tournament
Abilene Christian:			39–32		
Abilene Christian Wildcats (Western Athletic Conference) (2022–present)
2022	Abilene Christian	30–29	14–16	4th (Southwest)	
2023	Abilene Christian	35–24	16–14	4th	
2024	Abilene Christian	33–25	19–12	2nd	WAC Tournament
2025	Abilene Christian	34–23	15–9	T–1st	WAC Tournament
Abilene Christian:		201–156	64–51		
Total:		201–156			
National champion Postseason invitational champion Conference regular season champion Conference regular season and conference tournament champion Division regular season champion Division regular season and conference tournament champion Conference tournament champion

== See also ==
- List of current NCAA Division I baseball coaches
