= Abilene Christian Wildcats baseball =

Abilene Christian Wildcats
- 2026 Abilene Christian Wildcats baseball team
- University: Abilene Christian University
- Head coach: Rick McCarty (8th season)
- Conference: UAC
- Location: Abilene, Texas
- Home stadium: Crutcher Scott Field (capacity: 4,000)
- Nickname: Wildcats
- Colors: Purple and white

College World Series appearances
- Division II: 2003

NCAA tournament appearances
- Division II: 1996, 2000, 2001, 2002, 2003, 2005, 2006, 2008, 2009, 2010

Conference tournament champions
- Lone Star: 1993, 1996, 2000, 2001, 2002, 2009, 2010

Conference regular season champions
- Lone Star: 1993, 1996, 2005, 2007, 2008, 2009, 2010; Southland: 2021; WAC: 2025

The Abilene Christian Wildcats baseball team is a varsity intercollegiate athletic team of Abilene Christian University in Abilene, Texas, United States. The team is a member of the United Athletic Conference, which is part of the National Collegiate Athletic Association's Division I. The team plays its home games at Crutcher Scott Field in Abilene, Texas. The Wildcats are currently coached by Rick McCarty.

== Crutcher Scott Field ==
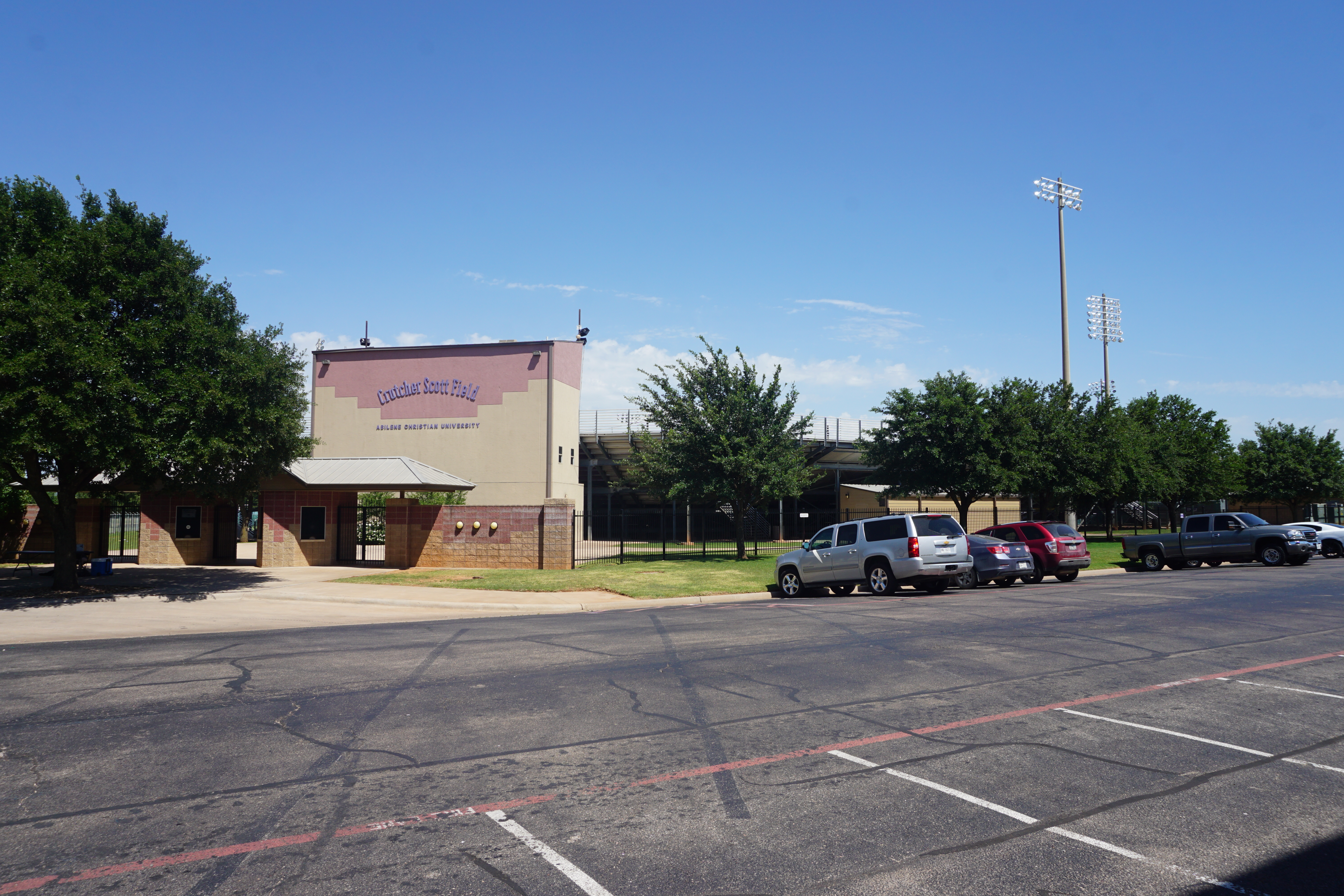
Crutcher Scott Field, 2019.

Crutcher Scott Field is a 4,000-seat baseball stadium located in Abilene, Texas. Built between 1990 and 1991, it hosted the Abilene Prairie Dogs from 1995 to 1999 and is the current home of the Abilene Christian Wildcats baseball team. Located on the campus of Abilene Christian University. After the conclusion of the 2024 season the stadium began phase 1 of a multi phase renovation. As of April 2025 phase 1 is complete including a full rebuild of all but the 3rd base side including full chair back seats and a roof canopy. Phase 1 also included a new turf field and new player facilities as well as spectator suites. The stadium now reads “Bullock Brothers Ballpark” on the buildings exterior, but the “Crutcher Scott Field” name remains written on the playing surface.

== Major League Baseball ==
Abilene Christian has had 15 Major League Baseball draft selections since the draft began in 1965.

Wildcats in the Major League Baseball Draft
Year	Player	Round	Team
1969	Bill Gilbreth	3	Tigers
1992	Louis Maberry	44	Reds
2001	Adam Thomas	19	Orioles
2002	Frankie Keller	10	Reds
2006	Joel Wells	21	Mets
2007	Jameson Maj	45	Cardinals
2008	Trey Watten	7	Brewers
2011	Ian Tomkins	50	Rays
2014	Seth Spivey	10	Rangers
2017	Brandon Lambright	27	Rockies
2019	Luis Trevino	40	Rays
2023	Riley Bauman	13	Angels
2023	Tyler Morgan	14	Padres
2023	Logan Britt	17	Angels
2024	Dash Albus	19	Royals

== See also ==
- List of NCAA Division I baseball programs
