= 2021 Southeastern Louisiana Lions baseball team =

American college baseball season

2021 Southeastern Louisiana Lions baseball
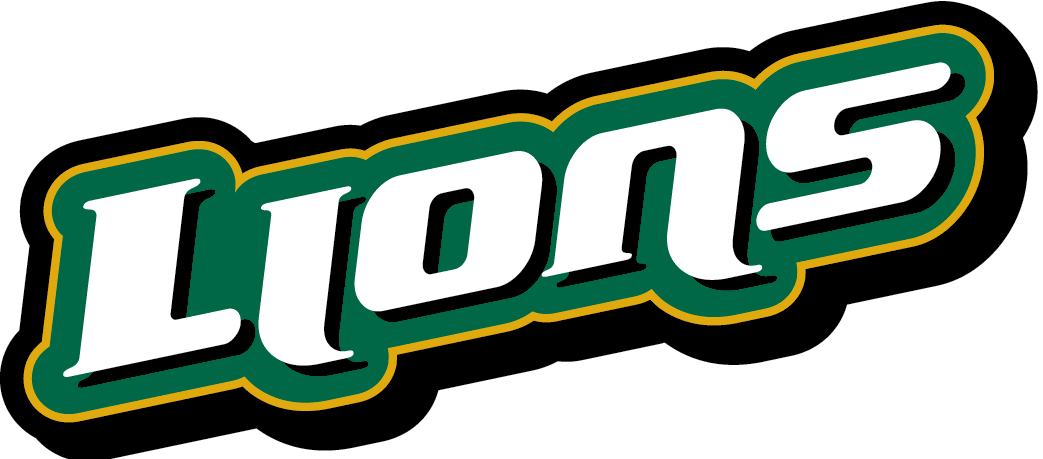
- Conference: Southland Conference
- Record: 32–24 (22–17 Southland)
- Head coach: Matt Riser (8th season)
- Assistant coaches: Tim Donnelly; Andrew Gipson; Gerry Salisbury
- Home stadium: Pat Kenelly Diamond at Alumni Field

2021 Southland Conference baseball standings
	Conf.				Overall
Team	W		L	PCT	W		L	PCT
Abilene Christian ‍†‍‍	25	–	13	.658	36	–	21	.632
Texas A&M–Corpus Christi ‍‍‍	20	–	14	.588	25	–	29	.463
New Orleans ‍‍‍	23	–	17	.575	29	–	28	.509
Sam Houston State ‍‍‍	20	–	15	.571	30	–	25	.545
Southeastern Louisiana ‍‍‍	22	–	17	.564	32	–	24	.571
Northwestern State ‍‍‍	20	–	16	.556	27	–	26	.509
McNeese State ‍‍‡‍^{y}	21	–	18	.538	32	–	30	.516
Lamar ‍‍‍	17	–	19	.472	25	–	23	.521
Central Arkansas ‍‍‍	18	–	22	.450	23	–	28	.451
Stephen F. Austin ‍‍‍	17	–	22	.436	20	–	31	.392
Incarnate Word ‍‍‍	17	–	23	.425	21	–	28	.429
Nicholls ‍‍‍	16	–	24	.400	21	–	34	.382
Houston Baptist ‍‍‍	11	–	27	.289	14	–	38	.269
† – Conference champion ‡ – Tournament champion y – Invited to the NCAA tournament As of June 6, 2021; Rankings from D1Baseball

The 2021 Southeastern Louisiana Lions baseball team represented Southeastern Louisiana University during the 2021 NCAA Division I baseball season. The Lions played their home games at Pat Kenelly Diamond at Alumni Field and were led by eighth–year head coach Matt Riser. They were members of the Southland Conference.

== Preseason ==
=== Southland Conference Coaches Poll ===
The Southland Conference Coaches Poll was released on February 11, 2021 and the Lions were picked to finish fourth in the conference with 243 votes and three first place vote.

Coaches poll
Predicted finish	Team	Votes (1st place)
1	Sam Houston State	276 (17)
2	Central Arkansas	247 (5)
3	McNeese State	244 (1)
4	Southeastern Louisiana	243 (3)
5	Northwestern State	193
6	Texas A&M–Corpus Christi	146
7	Incarnate Word	144
8	Nicholls	108
9	New Orleans	101
10	Abilene Christian	98
11	Stephen F. Austin	92
12	Lamar	87
13	Houston Baptist	49

=== Preseason All-Southland Team & Honors ===
==== First Team ====
- Ryan Flores (UIW, 1st Base)
- Nate Fisbeck (MCNS, 2nd Base)
- Beau Orlando (UCA, 3rd Base)
- JC Correa (LAMR, Shortstop)
- Gavin Johnson (SHSU, Catcher)
- Clayton Rasbeary (MCNS, Designated Hitter)
- Sean Arnold (UIW, Outfielder)
- Brandon Bena (HBU, Outfielder)
- Colton Cowser (SHSU, Outfielder)
- Noah Cameron (UCA, Pitcher)
- Will Dion (MCNS, Pitcher)
- Kyle Gruller (HBU, Pitcher)
- Conner Williams (UCA, Pitcher)
- Itchy Burts (TAMUCC, Utility)

==== Second Team ====
- Preston Faulkner (SELA, 1st Base)
- Logan Berlof (LAMR, 2nd Base)
- Anthony Quirion (LAMR, 3rd Base)
- Reid Bourque (MCNS, Shortstop)
- Chris Sandberg (NICH, Catcher)
- Lee Thomas (UIW, Designated Hitter)
- Josh Ragan (UCA, Outfielder)
- Jack Rogers (SHSU, Outfielder)
- Tyler Smith (NSU, Outfielder)
- John Gaddis (TAMUCC, Pitcher)
- Gavin Stone (UCA, Pitcher)
- Luke Taggart (UIW, Pitcher)
- Jeremy Rodriguez (SFA, Pitcher)
- Jake Dickerson (MCNS, Utility)

== Roster ==
2021 Southeastern Louisiana Lions baseball team
Players
Coaches

#	Pos.	Name	B/T	Height	Weight	Year	Home town
1	C	Bryce Grizzaffi	R/R	5 ft 10 in (1.78 m)	175 lb (79 kg)	Fr	Morgan City, Louisiana
2	INF	Tyler Finke	R/R	5 ft 11 in (1.8 m)	165 lb (75 kg)	So	Columbus, Indiana
3	INF	Eli Johnson	R/R	5 ft 10 in (1.78 m)	195 lb (88 kg)	Sr	Chehalis, Washington
4	INF	Champ Artigues	L/R	5 ft 9 in (1.75 m)	175 lb (79 kg)	RS Fr	Hammond, Louisiana
5	LHP	Noah Smith	R/L	6 ft 3 in (1.91 m)	153 lb (69 kg)	Fr	Houston, Texas
6	INF	Evan Keller	R/R	6 ft 1 in (1.85 m)	187 lb (85 kg)	Jr	Destrehan, Louisiana
7	RHP	Will Warren	R/R	6 ft 2 in (1.88 m)	175 lb (79 kg)	Jr	Brandon, Mississippi
8	OF	Joe Delaney	R/R	5 ft 8 in (1.73 m)	150 lb (68 kg)	Fr	Destrehan, Louisiana
9	OF	Christian Garcia	R/R	5 ft 11 in (1.8 m)	175 lb (79 kg)	Fr	Slidell, Louisiana
10	OF	Matt Taylor	R/R	5 ft 11 in (1.8 m)	175 lb (79 kg)	Jr	Pulaski, Mississippi
11	OF	Brandon Hale	R/R	5 ft 10 in (1.78 m)	180 lb (82 kg)	Jr	Pontotoc, Mississippi
12	OF	Nick Ray	R/R	6 ft 2 in (1.88 m)	200 lb (91 kg)	RS So	Jefferson, Louisiana
13	INF	Trey Harrington	R/R	6 ft 2 in (1.88 m)	176 lb (80 kg)	Jr	Lakeland, Tennessee
14	LHP	Antonio Buckley	R/L	5 ft 11 in (1.8 m)	185 lb (84 kg)	RS So	Centreville, Virginia
15	LHP	Trey Shaffer	L/L	6 ft 1 in (1.85 m)	180 lb (82 kg)	Jr	Biloxi, Mississippi
16	INF	Rhett Rosevear	L/R	5 ft 10 in (1.78 m)	170 lb (77 kg)	Fr	Denham Springs, Louisiana
17	RHP	Cole Hoskins	R/R	6 ft 1 in (1.85 m)	180 lb (82 kg)	Sr	Anaheim, California
19	RHP	Noah Hughes	R/R	6 ft 3 in (1.91 m)	205 lb (93 kg)	RS Sr	Ridgeland, Mississippi
21	RHP	Daniel Dugas	R/R	6 ft 0 in (1.83 m)	200 lb (91 kg)	Jr	Pearl River, Louisiana
22	INF	Preston Faulkner	R/R	6 ft 1 in (1.85 m)	230 lb (104 kg)	Jr	Denham Springs, Louisiana
23	INF	Jacob Burke	R/R	6 ft 0 in (1.83 m)	200 lb (91 kg)	Fr	St. Francisville, Louisiana
24	RHP	Andrew Landry	R/R	6 ft 1 in (1.85 m)	175 lb (79 kg)	Fr	Slidell, Louisiana
25	RHP	Grant Upton	R/R	6 ft 3 in (1.91 m)	200 lb (91 kg)	So	Baton Rouge, Louisiana
26	RHP	Hunter O'Toole	R/R	6 ft 2 in (1.88 m)	200 lb (91 kg)	So	Arkansas City, Kansas
27	RHP	Dalton Aspholm	R/R	6 ft 0 in (1.83 m)	190 lb (86 kg)	Fr	Baton Rouge, Louisiana
28	RHP	Kyle Bartley	R/R	5 ft 11 in (1.8 m)	205 lb (93 kg)	Fr	Lake Charles, Louisiana
29	RHP	Will Kinzeler	L/R	6 ft 5 in (1.96 m)	180 lb (82 kg)	Fr	Covington, Louisiana
30	LHP	Corbin Bozosi	L/L	6 ft 0 in (1.83 m)	185 lb (84 kg)	RS Jr	Keller, Texas
31	RHP	Landon Clifton	R/R	5 ft 10 in (1.78 m)	190 lb (86 kg)	Jr	Napoleonville, Louisiana
32	OF	Kenneth Bell, III	R/R	6 ft 1 in (1.85 m)	175 lb (79 kg)	Fr	Hammond, Louisiana
34	RHP	Brennan Stuprich	R/R	5 ft 10 in (1.78 m)	205 lb (93 kg)	Fr	Kenner, Louisiana
35	RHP	Kyle Flettrich	R/R	5 ft 9 in (1.75 m)	195 lb (88 kg)	RS Sr	Belle Chasse, Louisiana
36	LHP	Brock Batty	R/L	6 ft 1 in (1.85 m)	210 lb (95 kg)	Jr	Denham Springs, Louisiana
37	RHP	Ryan Keeley	R/R	6 ft 3 in (1.91 m)	200 lb (91 kg)	Fr	Naperville, Illinois
38	C	Gaby Cruz	R/R	6 ft 1 in (1.85 m)	210 lb (95 kg)	Sr	Miami, Florida
39	RHP	Gage Trahan	R/R	5 ft 10 in (1.78 m)	165 lb (75 kg)	Jr	Maurice, Louisiana
40	RHP	Robert Burke	R/R	6 ft 4 in (1.93 m)	210 lb (95 kg)	Jr	St. Francisville, Louisiana
41	INF	Nathan Tribble	L/R	6 ft 0 in (1.83 m)	180 lb (82 kg)	RS So	Ponchatoula, Louisiana
42	OF	Cade Scott	R/R	6 ft 1 in (1.85 m)	185 lb (84 kg)	Fr	Benton, Louisiana
	RHP	Matt Flowers	R/R	6 ft 2 in (1.88 m)	186 lb (84 kg)	Fr	Fulshear, Texas
	RHP	Cy Fontenot	R/R	5 ft 11 in (1.8 m)	168 lb (76 kg)	Fr	Pineville, Louisiana
	RHP	Cam Gauthier	R/R	5 ft 9 in (1.75 m)	170 lb (77 kg)	Fr	Lafayette, Louisiana
	RHP	Harrison Haley	R/R	6 ft 1 in (1.85 m)	195 lb (88 kg)	So	Canton, Mississippi
	C	Connor Manola	R/R	6 ft 0 in (1.83 m)	180 lb (82 kg)	RS So	Port Allen, Louisiana
	INF	Taylor Phillips	R/R	6 ft 2 in (1.88 m)	195 lb (88 kg)	Fr	Houston, Texas
		Greg Thompson, Jr.	R/R	5 ft 11 in (1.8 m)	205 lb (93 kg)	Jr	Zachary, Louisiana
	INF	Christian Westcott	R/R	6 ft 0 in (1.83 m)	220 lb (100 kg)	Fr	Mandeville, Louisiana

Head coach

Matt Riser (Tulane)

Assistant coach(es)

Tim Donnelly (Hardin–Simmons)
Andrew Gipson (Belhaven)
Gerry Salisbury (Ohio)

Legend

- (C) Team captain
- (S) Suspended
- (I) Ineligible
- Injured
- Current redshirt

Roster
Last update: 2021 June 19

== Schedule and results ==
Legend
	Southeastern Louisiana win
	Southeastern Louisiana loss
	Postponement/Cancelation/Suspensions
**Bold**	Southeastern Louisiana team member

2021 Southeastern Louisiana Lions baseball game log
Regular season (30-22)

February (3-4)
Date	Opponent	Rank	Site/stadium	Score	Win	Loss	Save	TV	Attendance	Overall record	SBC record
Feb. 20	Mississippi Valley State		Pat Kenelly Diamond at Alumni Field • Hammond, LA	**W** 26-0	**Shaffer** (1-0)	Johnson (0-1)	None	ESPN+	844	1-0	
Feb. 20	Mississippi Valley State		Pat Kenelly Diamond at Alumni Field • Hammond, LA	**W** 23-0	**Warren** (1-0)	Stallings (0-1)	None		818	2-0	
Feb. 21	Mississippi Valley State		Pat Kenelly Diamond at Alumni Field • Hammond, LA	**W** 17-0	**Upton** (1-0)	Charles (0-1)	None		844	3-0	
Feb. 25	at Arizona		Hi Corbett Field • Tucson, AZ	**L** 4-7	Silseth (2-0)	**Kinzeler** (0-1)	Price (1)	Pac-12+		3-1	
Feb. 26	at Arizona		Hi Corbett Field • Tucson, AZ	**L** 11-13	Murphy (1-0)	**Shaffer** (1-1)	Vannelle (2)	Pac-12+		3-2	
Feb. 27	at Arizona		Hi Corbett Field • Tucson, AZ	**L** 3-4	Long (1-0)	**Bartley** (0-1)	Flanagan (1)	Pac-12+		3-3	
Feb. 28	at Arizona		Hi Corbett Field • Tucson, AZ	**L** 2-14	Nichols (2-0)	**Upton** (1-1)	None	Pac-12+		3-4	

March (13-4)
Date	Opponent	Rank	Site/stadium	Score	Win	Loss	Save	TV	Attendance	Overall record	SBC record
Mar. 3	Tulane		Pat Kenelly Diamond at Alumni Field • Hammond, LA	**W** 6-1	**Kinzeler** (1-1)	Hoffman (0-1)	**Hughes** (1)		937	4-4	
Mar. 5	Troy		Pat Kenelly Diamond at Alumni Field • Hammond, LA	**W** 7-2	**Bartley** (1-1)	Ortiz (2-1)	None		898	5-4	
Mar. 6	Troy		Pat Kenelly Diamond at Alumni Field • Hammond, LA	**W** 7-1	**Warren** (2-0)	Gainous (2-1)	None		868	6-4	
Mar. 7	Troy		Pat Kenelly Diamond at Alumni Field • Hammond, LA	**W** 4-2	**Hughes** (1-0)	Oates (1-1)	None		833	7-4	
Mar. 12	Sam Houston State		Pat Kenelly Diamond at Alumni Field • Hammond, LA	**W** 12-3	**Kinzeler** (2-1)	Davis (2-1)	None		895	8-4	1-0
Mar. 13	Sam Houston State		Pat Kenelly Diamond at Alumni Field • Hammond, LA	**W** 3-2	**Warren** (3-0)	Havlicek (1-1)	None		837	9-4	2-0
Mar. 13	Sam Houston State		Pat Kenelly Diamond at Alumni Field • Hammond, LA	**W** 7-6	**Hoskins** (1-0)	Lusk (0-1)	None		849	10-4	3-0
Mar. 14	Sam Houston State		Pat Kenelly Diamond at Alumni Field • Hammond, LA	**W** 3-1	**Stuprich** (2-0)	Driskell (0-1)	**Hoskins** (1)	ESPN+	895	11-4	4-0
Mar. 16	at No. 19 LSU		Alex Box Stadium, Skip Bertman Field • Baton Rouge, LA	**L** 7-10	Hellmers (4-1)	**Batty** (0-1)	Edwards (2)	SECN+	3,906	11-5	
Mar. 19	at Incarnate Word		Sullivan Field • San Antonio, TX	**L** 5-6	Garza (1-0)	**Hughes** (1-1)	None		115	11-6	4-1
Mar. 20	at Incarnate Word		Sullivan Field • San Antonio, TX	**L** 0-5	Zavala (3-0)	**Warren** (3-1)	None		115	11-7	4-2
Mar. 20	at Incarnate Word		Sullivan Field • San Antonio, TX	**W** 7-6	**Bartley** (2-1)	Foral (1-1)	**Hoskins** (2)		115	12-7	5-2
Mar. 21	at Incarnate Word		Sullivan Field • San Antonio, TX	**L** 3-5	Hayward (1-3)	**Stuprich** (1-1)	Garza (2)		115	12-8	5-3
Mar. 26	at Lamar		Vincent–Beck Stadium • Beaumont, TX	**W** 3-0	**Kinzeler** (3-1)	Trevin (1-1)	**Hughes** (2)		712	13-8	6-3
Mar. 27	at Lamar		Vincent–Beck Stadium • Beaumont, TX	**W** 6-5	**Warren** (4-1)	Buckendorff (0-1)	**Hoskins** (3)		762	14-8	7-3
Mar. 27	at Lamar		Vincent–Beck Stadium • Beaumont, TX	**W** 6-2	**Bartley** (3-1)	Ekness (0-1)	**Flettrich** (1)		652	15-8	8-3
Mar. 28	at Lamar		Vincent–Beck Stadium • Beaumont, TX	**W** 9-8	**Hoskins** (2-0)	Dallas (0-1)	**Aspholm** (1)		512	16-8	9-3

April (9-7)
Date	Opponent	Rank	Site/stadium	Score	Win	Loss	Save	TV	Attendance	Overall record	SBC record
Apr. 1	McNeese State		Pat Kenelly Diamond at Alumni Field • Hammond, LA	**L** 4-6	Roliard (2-2)	**Hughes** (1-2)	None	ESPN+	918	16-9	9-4
Apr. 2	McNeese State		Pat Kenelly Diamond at Alumni Field • Hammond, LA	**L** 0-5	Dion (3-3)	**Shaffer** (1-2)	None	ESPN+	937	16-10	9-5
Apr. 2	McNeese State		Pat Kenelly Diamond at Alumni Field • Hammond, LA	**W** 6-3	**Warren** (5-1)	Ellison (1-1)	**Hoskins** (4)	ESPN+	937	17-10	10-5
Apr. 3	McNeese State		Pat Kenelly Diamond at Alumni Field • Hammond, LA	**W** 13-9	**Stuprich** (2-1)	Meeks (0-1)	None	ESPN+	925	18-10	11-5
Apr. 9	Abilene Christian		Pat Kenelly Diamond at Alumni Field • Hammond, LA	**L** 9-13	Carlton (1-1)	**Flettrich** (0-1)	Riley (2)	ESPN+	765	18-11	11-6
Apr. 10	Abilene Christian		Pat Kenelly Diamond at Alumni Field • Hammond, LA	**W** 8-3	**Shaffer** (2-2)	Cervantes (5-1)	**Dugas** (1)	ESPN+	800	19-11	12-6
Apr. 10	Abilene Christian		Pat Kenelly Diamond at Alumni Field • Hammond, LA	**L** 4-8	Jackson (1-1)	**Hughes** (1-3)	Riley (3)	ESPN+	825	19-12	12-7
Apr. 11	Abilene Christian		Pat Kenelly Diamond at Alumni Field • Hammond, LA	**W** 7-0	**Stuprich** (3-1)	Chirpich (3-2)	None	ESPN+	832	20-12	13-7
Apr. 16	at Stephen F. Austin		Jaycees Field • Nacogdoches, TX	**W** 6-2	**Warren** (6-1)	Gennari (2-3)	None		150	21-12	14-7
Apr. 17	at Stephen F. Austin		Jaycees Field • Nacogdoches, TX	**W** 7-4	**Kinzeler** (4-1)	Lee (1-2)	**Hoskins** (5)		100	22-12	15-7
Apr. 17	at Stephen F. Austin		Jaycees Field • Nacogdoches, TX	**W** 9-6	**Harrington** (1-0)	Gauthe (1-1)	**Flettrich** (2)		120	23-12	16-7
Apr. 18	at Stephen F. Austin		Jaycees Field • Nacogdoches, TX	**W** 5-3	**Stuprich** (4-1)	Sgambelluri (2-2)	None		120	24-12	17-7
Apr. 23	at New Orleans		Maestri Field at Privateer Park • New Orleans, LA	**L** 8-9	Lamkin (2-1)	**Warren** (6-2)	Seroski (6)		353	24-13	17-8
Apr. 24	at New Orleans		Maestri Field at Privateer Park • New Orleans, LA	**L** 4-8	Turpin (7-1)	**Shaffer** (2-3)	None		489	24-14	17-9
Apr. 24	at New Orleans		Maestri Field at Privateer Park • New Orleans, LA	**L** 3-11	Mitchell (3-1)	**Kinzeler** (4-2)	Seroski (7)		389	24-15	17-10
Apr. 25	at New Orleans		Maestri Field at Privateer Park • New Orleans, LA	**W** 7-0	**Stuprich** (5-1)	Acree (1-1)	None		279	25-15	18-10

May (5–7)
Date	Opponent	Rank	Site/stadium	Score	Win	Loss	Save	TV	Attendance	Overall record	SBC record
May 5	at No. 20 Southern Miss		Pete Taylor Park • Hattiesburg, MS	**W** 5-3	**Batty** (1-1)	Adams (0-1)	**Shaffer** (1)	CUSA.TV		26-15	
May 7	Nicholls		Pat Kenelly Diamond at Alumni Field • Hammond, LA	**L** 3-11	Balado (4-1)	**Harrington** (1-1)	None	ESPN+	1,035	26-16	18-11
May 8	Nicholls		Pat Kenelly Diamond at Alumni Field • Hammond, LA	**W** 7-6	**Flettrich** (1-1)	Kilcrease (2-7)	**Shaffer** (2)	ESPN+	968	27-16	19-11
May 8	Nicholls		Pat Kenelly Diamond at Alumni Field • Hammond, LA	**W** 5-4	**Stuprich** (6-1)	Desandro (3-3)	**Shaffer** (3)	ESPN+	1,053	28-16	20-11
May 9	at Nicholls		Ben Meyer Diamond at Ray E. Didier Field • Thibodaux, LA	**L** 2-4	Heckman (2-5)	**Kinzeler** (4-3)	Taylor (10)		847	28-17	20-12
May 14	at Texas A&M–Corpus Christi–		Chapman Field • Corpus Christi, TX	**L** 3-4	Miller (2-3)	**Hoskins** (2-1)	None		210	28-18	20-13
May 14	at Texas A&M–Corpus Christi		Chapman Field • Corpus Christi, TX	**L** 1-2	Ramirez (7-2)	**Stuprich** (6-2)	None		210	28-19	20-14
May 15	at Texas A&M–Corpus Christi		Chapman Field • Corpus Christi, TX	**L** 6-10	Thomas (4-3)	**Kinzeler** (4-4)	None		290	28-20	20-15
May 16	at Texas A&M–Corpus Christi		Chapman Field • Corpus Christi, TX	Game cancelled							
May 20	Houston Baptist		Pat Kenelly Diamond at Alumni Field • Hammond, LA	**W** 10-0	**Warren** (7-2)	Coats (3-8)	None	ESPN+	825	29-20	21-15
May 21	Houston Baptist		Pat Kenelly Diamond at Alumni Field • Hammond, LA	**L** 1-3	Tinker (2-4)	**Hoskins** (2-2)	None	ESPN+	848	29-21	21-16
May 21	Houston Baptist		Pat Kenelly Diamond at Alumni Field • Hammond, LA	**L** 3-4	Reitmeyer (3-4)	**Harrington** (1-2)	None	ESPN+	879	29-22	21-17
May 22	Houston Baptist		Pat Kenelly Diamond at Alumni Field • Hammond, LA	**W** 8-2	**Bartley** (4-1)	Zarella (0-7)	None	ESPN+	915	30-22	22-17

Postseason (2–2)

SBC Tournament (2–2)
Date	Opponent	Seed/Rank	Site/stadium	Score	Win	Loss	Save	TV	Attendance	Overall record	Tournament record
May 26	vs. (6) Northwestern State	(3)	Pat Kenelly Diamond at Alumni Field • Hammond, LA	**W** 2-1	**Shaffer** (3-3)	Brown (2-3)	None	ESPN+	1,467	31-22	1-0
May 27	vs. (7) McNeese State	(3)	Pat Kenelly Diamond at Alumni Field • Hammond, LA	**L** 2-3	Ellison (5-3)	**Stuprich** (6-3)	Foster (5)	ESPN+	1,167	31-23	1-1
May 28	vs. (2) New Orleans	(3)	Pat Kenelly Diamond at Alumni Field • Hammond, LA	**W** 15-13	**O'Toole** (1-0)	Seroski (4-4)	**Shaffer** (4)	ESPN+	874	32-23	2-1
May 28	vs. (7) McNeese State	(3)	Pat Kenelly Diamond at Alumni Field • Hammond, LA	**L** 2-18 (7 inns)	Abraham (4-3)	**Dugas** (0-1)	None	ESPN+	1,225	32-24	2-2

Schedule source:

*Rankings are based on the team's current ranking in the D1Baseball poll.

== Postseason ==
=== Conference accolades ===
- Player of the Year: Colton Cowser – SHSU
- Hitter of the Year: Colton Eager – ACU
- Pitcher of the Year: Will Dion – MCNS
- Relief Pitcher of the Year: Tyler Cleveland – UCA
- Freshman of the Year: Brennan Stuprich – SELA
- Newcomer of the Year: Grayson Tatrow – ACU
- Clay Gould Coach of the Year: Rick McCarty – ACU

All Conference First Team

- Chase Kemp (LAMR)
- Nate Fisbeck (MCNS)
- Itchy Burts (TAMUCC)
- Bash Randle (ACU)
- Mitchell Dickson (ACU)
- Lee Thomas (UIW)
- Colton Cowser (SHSU)
- Colton Eager (ACU)
- Clayton Rasbeary (MCNS)
- Will Dion (MCNS)
- Brennan Stuprich (SELA)
- Will Warren (SELA)
- Tyler Cleveland (UCA)
- Anthony Quirion (LAMR)

All Conference Second Team

- Preston Faulkner (SELA)
- Daunte Stuart (NSU)
- Kasten Furr (UNO)
- Evan Keller (SELA)
- Skylar Black (SFA)
- Tre Obregon III (MCNS)
- Jack Rogers (SHSU)
- Pearce Howard (UNO)
- Grayson Tatrow (ACU)
- Chris Turpin (UNO)
- John Gaddis (TAMUCC)
- Trevin Michael (LAMR)
- Caleb Seroski (UNO)
- Jacob Burke (SELA)

All Conference Third Team

- Luke Marbach (TAMUCC)
- Salo Iza (UNO)
- Austin Cain (NICH)
- Darren Willis (UNO)
- Ryan Snell (LAMR)
- Tommy Cruz (ACU)
- Tyler Finke (SELA)
- Payton Harden (MCNS)
- Mike Williams (TAMUCC)
- Cal Carver (NSU)
- Levi David (NSU)
- Dominic Robinson (SHSU)
- Jack Dallas (LAMR)
- Brett Hammit (ACU)

All Conference Defensive Team

- Luke Marbach (TAMUCC)
- Nate Fisebeck (MCNS)
- Anthony Quirion (LAMR)
- Darren Willis (UNO)
- Gaby Cruz (SELA)
- Julian Gonzales (MCNS)
- Colton Cowser (SHSU)
- Avery George (LAMR)
- Will Dion (MCNS)
