= 2021 New Orleans Privateers baseball team =

American university baseball team

2021 New Orleans Privateers baseball
- Conference: Southland Conference
- Record: 29–28 (23–17 Southland)
- Head coach: Blake Dean (6th season)
- Assistant coaches: Brett Stewart; A. J. Battisto
- Home stadium: Maestri Field at Privateer Park

2021 Southland Conference baseball standings
	Conf.				Overall
Team	W		L	PCT	W		L	PCT
Abilene Christian ‍†‍‍	25	–	13	.658	36	–	21	.632
Texas A&M–Corpus Christi ‍‍‍	20	–	14	.588	25	–	29	.463
New Orleans ‍‍‍	23	–	17	.575	29	–	28	.509
Sam Houston State ‍‍‍	20	–	15	.571	30	–	25	.545
Southeastern Louisiana ‍‍‍	22	–	17	.564	32	–	24	.571
Northwestern State ‍‍‍	20	–	16	.556	27	–	26	.509
McNeese State ‍‍‡‍^{y}	21	–	18	.538	32	–	30	.516
Lamar ‍‍‍	17	–	19	.472	25	–	23	.521
Central Arkansas ‍‍‍	18	–	22	.450	23	–	28	.451
Stephen F. Austin ‍‍‍	17	–	22	.436	20	–	31	.392
Incarnate Word ‍‍‍	17	–	23	.425	21	–	28	.429
Nicholls ‍‍‍	16	–	24	.400	21	–	34	.382
Houston Baptist ‍‍‍	11	–	27	.289	14	–	38	.269
† – Conference champion ‡ – Tournament champion y – Invited to the NCAA tournament As of June 6, 2021; Rankings from D1Baseball

The 2021 New Orleans Privateers baseball team represented the University of New Orleans during the 2021 NCAA Division I baseball season. The Privateers played their home games at Maestri Field at Privateer Park and were led by sixth–year head coach Blake Dean. They were members of the Southland Conference.

== Preseason ==
=== Southland Conference Coaches Poll ===
The Southland Conference Coaches Poll was released on February 11, 2021, and the Privateers were picked to finish ninth in the conference with 101 votes.

Coaches poll
Predicted finish	Team	Votes (1st place)
1	Sam Houston State	276 (17)
2	Central Arkansas	247 (5)
3	McNeese State	244 (1)
4	Southeastern Louisiana	243 (3)
5	Northwestern State	193
6	Texas A&M–Corpus Christi	146
7	Incarnate Word	144
8	Nicholls	108
9	New Orleans	101
10	Abilene Christian	98
11	Stephen F. Austin	92
12	Lamar	87
13	Houston Baptist	49

=== Preseason All-Southland Team & Honors ===
No UNO players were chosen to the All-Southland team.

== Roster ==
2021 New Orleans Privateers baseball team
Players
Coaches

#	Pos.	Name	B/T	Height	Weight	Year	Home town
1	RHP	Cortlynn Ramirez	R/R	6 ft 5 in (1.96 m)	195 lb (88 kg)	So	Center Point, Louisiana
2	RHP	Caleb Seroski	R/R	6 ft 1 in (1.85 m)	155 lb (70 kg)	Fr	New Iberia, Louisiana
3	INF	Darren Willis	R/R	5 ft 9 in (1.75 m)	170 lb (77 kg)	Sr	Metairie, Louisiana
4	OF	Luther Woullard	R/R	6 ft 1 in (1.85 m)	210 lb (95 kg)	Sr	D'Iberville, Mississippi
5	RHP	Matt Barthelemy	R/R	5 ft 10 in (1.78 m)	165 lb (75 kg)	So	Belle Chasse, Louisiana
6	INF	Vincent Sanchez	R/R	5 ft 8 in (1.73 m)	175 lb (79 kg)	Fr	Houston, Texas
7	RHP	Chris Turpin	R/R	6 ft 0 in (1.83 m)	175 lb (79 kg)	Sr	Belle Chasse, Louisiana
8	LHP	Tyler LeBlanc	L/L	6 ft 4 in (1.93 m)	200 lb (91 kg)	Fr	Lafayette, Louisiana
9	OF	Issac Williams	R/R	5 ft 10 in (1.78 m)	195 lb (88 kg)	Fr	Alexandria, Louisiana
10	C	Beau Bratton	L/R	5 ft 11 in (1.8 m)	190 lb (86 kg)	Sr	Biloxi, Mississippi
11	INF	Hudson Laborde (redshirt)	R/R	6 ft 0 in (1.83 m)	205 lb (93 kg)	Jr	Lafayette, Louisiana
12	RHP	Haden Erbe	R/R	6 ft 3 in (1.91 m)	225 lb (102 kg)	RS Jr	Lafayette, Louisiana
13	OF	KC Simonich	L/R	6 ft 3 in (1.91 m)	195 lb (88 kg)	Jr	Lemont, Illinois
15	LHP	Kyle Khachadourian	R/L	6 ft 0 in (1.83 m)	215 lb (98 kg)	Jr	Palm Beach Gardens, Florida
16	RHP	Connor Macip	R/R	6 ft 3 in (1.91 m)	223 lb (101 kg)	Fr	Scott, Louisiana
17	INF	Travis Gober	L/R	6 ft 3 in (1.91 m)	225 lb (102 kg)	Fr	Rockwall, Texas
18	INF	Kasten Furr	R/R	5 ft 9 in (1.75 m)	180 lb (82 kg)	Fr	Ruston, Louisiana
19	RHP	Austin Acree	R/R	6 ft 2 in (1.88 m)	220 lb (100 kg)	RS Fr	West Monroe, Louisiana
20	INF	Blake Way	R/R	5 ft 10 in (1.78 m)	205 lb (93 kg)	Sr	Slidell, Louisiana
22	LHP	Cristian Poche	L/L	6 ft 0 in (1.83 m)	180 lb (82 kg)	RS Fr	New Orleans, Louisiana
24	RHP	Jacob Mead	R/R	6 ft 4 in (1.93 m)	210 lb (95 kg)	Jr	Round Rock, Texas
25	RHP	Collin Kulivan	R/R	6 ft 4 in (1.93 m)	220 lb (100 kg)	Jr	New Orleans, Louisiana
26	C	Andrew Guidry	L/R	6 ft 1 in (1.85 m)	187 lb (85 kg)	Fr	Lafayette, Louisiana
27	OF	Gaige Howard	L/R	6 ft 2 in (1.88 m)	220 lb (100 kg)	Sr	Carlsbad, California
28	RHP	Rudy Amaya (redshirt)	R/R	6 ft 2 in (1.88 m)	190 lb (86 kg)	Jr	Pooler, Georgia
29	INF	Salo Iza	R/R	6 ft 0 in (1.83 m)	180 lb (82 kg)	Sr	Key Biscayne, Florida
30	RHP	Joshua Cerejo	R/R	6 ft 3 in (1.91 m)	210 lb (95 kg)	So	Walnut Creek, California
31	LHP	Matt Delcambre	L/L	6 ft 3 in (1.91 m)	205 lb (93 kg)	So	Lafayette, Louisiana
32	RHP	Bailey Holstein	R/R	6 ft 3 in (1.91 m)	225 lb (102 kg)	RS Sr	Denham Springs, Louisiana
33	LHP	Brandon Mitchell	L/L	6 ft 2 in (1.88 m)	220 lb (100 kg)	So	Houston, Texas
34	C	Jorge Tejeda	R/R	5 ft 10 in (1.78 m)	190 lb (86 kg)	So	Villa Clara, Cuba
35	OF	Pearce Howard	L/R	6 ft 4 in (1.93 m)	225 lb (102 kg)	Jr	Silver Spring, Maryland
36	RHP	Jacob Lamkin (redshirt)	R/R	5 ft 9 in (1.75 m)	175 lb (79 kg)	Fr	Youngsville, Louisiana
37	C	Jackson Murphy	R/R	6 ft 0 in (1.83 m)	190 lb (86 kg)	Jr	Troy, Alabama
38	RHP	Brad Randazzo	R/R	6 ft 0 in (1.83 m)	160 lb (73 kg)	Jr	Metairie, Louisiana
40	RHP	Beau Blanchard	R/R	6 ft 5 in (1.96 m)	200 lb (91 kg)	Fr	New Iberia, Louisiana
41	RHP	Patrick Apgar	R/R	6 ft 8 in (2.03 m)	235 lb (107 kg)	Fr	Little Egg Harbor, New Jersey
42	RHP	Jalen Cowan	R/R	6 ft 2 in (1.88 m)	245 lb (111 kg)	Fr	Clinton, Mississippi
45	LHP	Keegan Rich	L/L	6 ft 4 in (1.93 m)	225 lb (102 kg)	Fr	Newnan, Georgia
52	LHP	Christopher DeMayo	L/L	6 ft 0 in (1.83 m)	160 lb (73 kg)	Sr	Stuart, Florida
	RHP	Kindred Atwood	R/R	6 ft 3 in (1.91 m)	200 lb (91 kg)	Fr	Ayer, Massachusetts
	OF	Jamarian Crain	R/R	5 ft 10 in (1.78 m)	170 lb (77 kg)	Jr	Franklinton, Louisiana
	OF	Max Dias	R/R	6 ft 0 in (1.83 m)	210 lb (95 kg)	Fr	Porter, Texas
	P	Michael Kokoszka	/	—	—	So	Westmont, Illinois
	INF	Tyler Pope	R/R	5 ft 10 in (1.78 m)	185 lb (84 kg)	Fr	Alexandria, Louisiana
	RHP	Tanner Young	R/R	6 ft 1 in (1.85 m)	160 lb (73 kg)	Jr	Vinton, Louisiana

Head coach

Blake Dean (Louisiana State)

Assistant coach(es)

Brett Stewart (Appalachian State)
A. J. Battisto (University of Phoenix)
Hezekiah Randolph (New Orleans)

Legend

- (C) Team captain
- (S) Suspended
- (I) Ineligible
- Injured
- Current redshirt

Roster
Last update: 2021 June 15

== Schedule and results ==
Legend
	New Orleans win
	New Orleans loss
	Postponement/Cancelation/Suspensions
**Bold**	New Orleans team member

2021 New Orleans Privateers baseball game log
Regular season (28-26)

February (4-3)
Date	Opponent	Rank	Site/stadium	Score	Win	Loss	Save	TV	Attendance	Overall record	SLC Record
Feb. 20	Southern		Maestri Field at Privateer Park • New Orleans, LA	**W** 10-5	**Turpin** (1-0)	Guienze (0-1)	**Kulivan** (1)		143	1-0	
Feb. 21	Southern		Maestri Field at Privateer Park • New Orleans, LA	**L** 3-4	Battaglia (1-0)	**Seroski** (0-1)	Frak (1)		247	1-1	
Feb. 20	Southern		Maestri Field at Privateer Park • New Orleans, LA	**W** 6-3	**Acree** (1-0)	Davis (0-1)	**Kulivan** (1)		247	2-1	
Feb. 23	at Tulane		Greer Field at Turchin Stadium • New Orleans, LA	**L** 1-7	Devito (1-0)	**Ramirez** (0-1)	None		335	2-2	
Feb. 26	Louisiana–Monroe		Maestri Field at Privateer Park • New Orleans, LA	**W** 7-6	**Seroski** (1-1)	Wrobel (0-1)	**Kulivan** (3)		271	3-2	
Feb. 27	Louisiana–Monroe		Maestri Field at Privateer Park • New Orleans, LA	**W** 7-4	**Khachadourian** (1-0)	Lindsay (0-1)	**Kulivan** (4)		349	4-2	
Feb. 28	Louisiana–Monroe		Maestri Field at Privateer Park • New Orleans, LA	**L** 2-7	Lien (1-0)	**Holstein** (0-1)	None		344	4-3	

March (8-9)
Date	Opponent	Rank	Site/stadium	Score	Win	Loss	Save	TV	Attendance	Overall record	SLC Record
Mar. 3	South Alabama		Maestri Field at Privateer Park • New Orleans, LA	**L** 0-5	Boyd (2-1)	**Erbe** (0-1)	None		195	4-4	
Mar. 5	Bradley		Maestri Field at Privateer Park • New Orleans, LA	**W** 5-0	**Turpin** (2-0)	Mall (0-1)	**Khachadourian** (1)		231	5-4	
Mar. 6	Bradley		Maestri Field at Privateer Park • New Orleans, LA	**L** 5-9	Mascot (1-0)	**Amaya** (0-1)	None		167	5-5	
Mar. 7	Bradley		Maestri Field at Privateer Park • New Orleans, LA	**L** 3-6	Hamilton (1-0)	**Barthelemy** (0-1)	Denlinger (1)		125	5-6	
Mar. 10	No. 21 LSU		Maestri Field at Privateer Park • New Orleans, LA	**L** 0-5	Hellmers (3-1)	**Lamkin** (0-1)	None	CST/ESPN+		5-7	
Mar. 12	Houston Baptist		Maestri Field at Privateer Park • New Orleans, LA	**W** 3-0	**Turpin** (3-0)	Zarella (0-2)	None		262	6-7	1-0
Mar. 13	Houston Baptist		Maestri Field at Privateer Park • New Orleans, LA	**W** 11-10 (9 inns)	**Barthelemy** (1-1)	Reitmeyer (2-1)	None		413	7-7	2-0
Mar. 13	Houston Baptist		Maestri Field at Privateer Park • New Orleans, LA	**W** 8-2	**Khachadourian** (2-0)	Spinney (0-2)	None		413	8-7	3-0
Mar. 14	Houston Baptist		Maestri Field at Privateer Park • New Orleans, LA	**W** 9-2	**Seroski** (2-1)	Tinker (0-1)	None		396	9-7	4-0
Mar. 19	at Stephen F. Austin		Jaycees Field • Nacogdoches, TX	**W** 6-4	**Lamkin** (1-1)	Gennari (1-1)	None		200	10-7	5-0
Mar. 20	at Stephen F. Austin		Jaycees Field • Nacogdoches, TX	**L** 4-5	Poell (1-1)	**Erbe** (0-2)	Gauthe (2)		450	10-8	5-1
Mar. 20	at Stephen F. Austin		Jaycees Field • Nacogdoches, TX	**W** 8-4	**Seroski** (3-1)	Stobart (0-2)	None		500	11-8	6-1
Mar. 21	at Stephen F. Austin		Jaycees Field • Nacogdoches, TX	**L** 3-5	Lee (2-3)	**Cerejo** (0-1)	Gauthe (3)		278	11-9	6-2
Mar. 26	Abilene Christian		Maestri Field at Privateer Park • New Orleans, LA	**L** 6-9	Huffling (3-0)	**Turpin** (3-1)	Riley (1)		316	11-10	6-3
Mar. 27	Abilene Christian		Maestri Field at Privateer Park • New Orleans, LA	**L** 10-19 (7 inns)	Cervantes (4-0)	**Barthelemy** (1-2)	None		286	11-11	6-4
Mar. 27	Abilene Christian		Maestri Field at Privateer Park • New Orleans, LA	**W** 8-4	**Seroski** (4-1)	Glaze (0-1)	None		286	12-11	7-4
Mar. 28	Abilene Christian		Maestri Field at Privateer Park • New Orleans, LA	**L** 12-16	Chirpich (3-1)	**LeBlanc** (0-1)	None		207	12-12	7-5

April (11-6)
Date	Opponent	Rank	Site/stadium	Score	Win	Loss	Save	TV	Attendance	Overall record	SLC Record
Apr. 1	at Texas A&M–Corpus Christi		Chapman Field • Corpus Christi, TX	**W** 5-4	**Mitchell** (1-0)	Ramirez (1-2)	**Seroski** (1)		212	13-12	8-5
Apr. 2	at Texas A&M–Corpus Christi		Chapman Field • Corpus Christi, TX	**W** 7-6 (8 inns)	**Turpin** (4-1)	Johnson (0-1)	None		189	14-12	9-5
Apr. 2	at Texas A&M–Corpus Christi		Chapman Field • Corpus Christi, TX	**L** 4-6	Miller (1-2)	**Kulivan** (0-1)	None		191	14-13	9-6
Apr. 3	at Texas A&M–Corpus Christi		Chapman Field • Corpus Christi, TX	**W** 6-4	**Cerejo** (1-1)	Lopez (0-1)	**Seroski** (2)		156	15-13	10-6
Apr. 9	Sam Houston State		Maestri Field at Privateer Park • New Orleans, LA	**W** 9-7	**Turpin** (5-1)	Davis (4-2)	**Khachadourian** (2)		286	16-13	11-6
Apr. 9	Sam Houston State		Maestri Field at Privateer Park • New Orleans, LA	**L** 4-13	Robinson (3-1)	**Mitchell** (1-1)	None		286	16-14	11-7
Apr. 10	Sam Houston State		Maestri Field at Privateer Park • New Orleans, LA	**W** 20-13	**Kulivan** (1-1)	Sembera (1-1)	**Seroski** (3)		262	17-14	12-7
Apr. 11	Sam Houston State		Maestri Field at Privateer Park • New Orleans, LA	**L** 1-7	Backhus (1-0)	**LeBlanc** (0-2)	Atkinson (1)		283	17-15	12-8
Apr. 16	at Incarnate Word		Sullivan Field • San Antonio, TX	**W** 5-4	**Erbe** (1-2)	Cassidy (0-1)	**Seroski** (4)		64	18-15	13-8
Apr. 17	at Incarnate Word		Sullivan Field • San Antonio, TX	**W** 13-5	**Turpin** (6-1)	Garza (3-2)	None		102	19-15	14-8
Apr. 17	at Incarnate Word		Sullivan Field • San Antonio, TX	**W** 3-1	**Mitchell** (2-1)	Minter (0-2)	**Seroski** (5)		102	20-15	15-8
Apr. 18	at Incarnate Word		Sullivan Field • San Antonio, TX	**L** 3-6	Zavala (4-2)	**LeBlanc** (0-3)	McElmeel (1)		88	20-16	15-9
Apr. 23	Southeastern Louisiana		Maestri Field at Privateer Park • New Orleans, LA	**W** 9-8	**Lamkin** (2-1)	Warren (6-2)	**Seroski** (6)		353	21-16	16-9
Apr. 24	Southeastern Louisiana		Maestri Field at Privateer Park • New Orleans, LA	**W** 8-4	**Turpin** (7-1)	Shaffer (2-3)	None		489	22-16	17-9
Apr. 24	Southeastern Louisiana		Maestri Field at Privateer Park • New Orleans, LA	**W** 11-3	**Mitchell** (3-1)	Kinzeler (4-2)	**Seroski** (7)		389	23-16	18-9
Apr. 25	Southeastern Louisiana		Maestri Field at Privateer Park • New Orleans, LA	**L** 0-7	Stuprich (5-1)	**Acree** (1-1)	None		279	23-17	18-10
Apr. 30	at McNeese State		Joe Miller Ballpark • Lake Charles, LA	**L** 6-8	Reeves (2-1)	**Erbe** (1-3)	Foster (3)		399	23-18	18-11

May (5–8)
Date	Opponent	Rank	Site/stadium	Score	Win	Loss	Save	TV	Attendance	Overall record	SLC Record
May 1	at McNeese State		Joe Miller Ballpark • Lake Charles, LA	**L** 3-8	Dion (5-4)	**Turpin** (7-2)	None		447	23-19	18-12
May 1	at McNeese State		Joe Miller Ballpark • Lake Charles, LA	**W** 8-4	**Mitchell** (4-1)	Ellison (3-3)	**Seroski** (8)		487	24-19	19-12
May 2	at McNeese State		Joe Miller Ballpark • Lake Charles, LA	**W** 13-10	**Acree** (2-1)	Abraham (2-2)	**Seroski** (9)		379	25-19	20-12
May 7	Central Arkansas		Maestri Field at Privateer Park • New Orleans, LA	**L** 5-15 (7 inns)	Verel (2-1)	**Erbe** (1-4)	Gilbertson (1)		437	25-20	20-13
May 8	Central Arkansas		Maestri Field at Privateer Park • New Orleans, LA	**W** 11-0 (7 inns)	**Turpin** (8-2)	Moyer (3-6)	None		492	26-20	21-13
May 8	Central Arkansas		Maestri Field at Privateer Park • New Orleans, LA	**L** 0-8	Williams (2-1)	**Mitchell** (4-2)	Cleveland (8)		358	26-21	21-14
May 9	Central Arkansas		Maestri Field at Privateer Park • New Orleans, LA	**W** 4-3	**LeBlanc** (1-3)	Gregson (0-2)	**Seroski** (10)		371	27-21	22-14
May 14	at Lamar		Vincent–Beck Stadium • Beaumont, TX	**L** 0-6	Michael (5-4)	**Erbe** (1-5)	None		618	27-22	22-15
May 15	at Lamar		Vincent–Beck Stadium • Beaumont, TX	**W** 2-0	**Turpin** (9-2)	Bravo (5-2)	None		724	28-22	23-15
May 15	at Lamar		Vincent–Beck Stadium • Beaumont, TX	**L** 2-3	Dallas (1-2)	**Seroski** (4-2)	None		724	28-23	23-16
May 16	at Lamar		Vincent–Beck Stadium • Beaumont, TX	**L** 4-6	Cole (2-0)	**Khachadourian** (2-1)	Dallas (11)		723	28-24	23-17
May 18	Louisiana		Maestri Field at Privateer Park • New Orleans, LA	Game cancelled							
May 20	at Oklahoma State		O'Brate Stadium • Stillwater, OK	**L** 6-9	Sifrit (2-0)	**Seroski** (4-3)	Martin (1)	ESPN+	6,362	28-25	
May 21	at Oklahoma State		O'Brate Stadium • Stillwater, OK	**L** 1-15 (7 inns)	Stone (2-0)	**LeBlanc** (1-4)	None		3,202	28-26	
May 22	at Oklahoma State		O'Brate Stadium • Stillwater, OK	Game cancelled							

Post-season (1–2)

SLC Tournament (1–2)
Date	Opponent	Seed/Rank	Site/stadium	Score	Win	Loss	Save	TV	Attendance	Overall record	Tournament record
May 26	vs. (7) McNeese State	(2)	Pat Kenelly Diamond at Alumni Field • Hammond, LA	**L** 0-12 (8 inns)	Dion (9-4)	**Turpin** (9-3)	None	ESPN+	1,262	28-27	0-1
May 26	vs. (6) Northwestern State	(2)	Pat Kenelly Diamond at Alumni Field • Hammond, LA	**W** 14-1 (7 inns)	**Mitchell** (5-2)	David (2-6)	None	ESPN+	914	29-27	1-1
May 28	vs. (3) Southeastern Louisiana	(2)	Pat Kenelly Diamond at Alumni Field • Hammond, LA	**L** 13-15	O'Toole (1-0)	**Seroski** (4-4)	Shaffer (4)	ESPN+	874	29-28	1-2

Schedule source:

*Rankings are based on the team's current ranking in the D1Baseball poll.

== Postseason ==
=== Conference accolades ===
- Player of the Year: Colton Cowser – SHSU
- Hitter of the Year: Colton Eager – ACU
- Pitcher of the Year: Will Dion – MCNS
- Relief Pitcher of the Year: Tyler Cleveland – UCA
- Freshman of the Year: Brennan Stuprich – SELA
- Newcomer of the Year: Grayson Tatrow – ACU
- Clay Gould Coach of the Year: Rick McCarty – ACU

All Conference First Team

- Chase Kemp (LAMR)
- Nate Fisbeck (MCNS)
- Itchy Burts (TAMUCC)
- Bash Randle (ACU)
- Mitchell Dickson (ACU)
- Lee Thomas (UIW)
- Colton Cowser (SHSU)
- Colton Eager (ACU)
- Clayton Rasbeary (MCNS)
- Will Dion (MCNS)
- Brennan Stuprich (SELA)
- Will Warren (SELA)
- Tyler Cleveland (UCA)
- Anthony Quirion (LAMR)

All Conference Second Team

- Preston Faulkner (SELA)
- Daunte Stuart (NSU)
- Kasten Furr (UNO)
- Evan Keller (SELA)
- Skylar Black (SFA)
- Tre Obregon III (MCNS)
- Jack Rogers (SHSU)
- Pearce Howard (UNO)
- Grayson Tatrow (ACU)
- Chris Turpin (UNO)
- John Gaddis (TAMUCC)
- Trevin Michael (LAMR)
- Caleb Seroski (UNO)
- Jacob Burke (SELA)

All Conference Third Team

- Luke Marbach (TAMUCC)
- Salo Iza (UNO)
- Austin Cain (NICH)
- Darren Willis (UNO)
- Ryan Snell (LAMR)
- Tommy Cruz (ACU)
- Tyler Finke (SELA)
- Payton Harden (MCNS)
- Mike Williams (TAMUCC)
- Cal Carver (NSU)
- Levi David (NSU)
- Dominic Robinson (SHSU)
- Jack Dallas (LAMR)
- Brett Hammit (ACU)

All Conference Defensive Team

- Luke Marbach (TAMUCC)
- Nate Fisebeck (MCNS)
- Anthony Quirion (LAMR)
- Darren Willis (UNO)
- Gaby Cruz (SELA)
- Julian Gonzales (MCNS)
- Colton Cowser (SHSU)
- Avery George (LAMR)
- Will Dion (MCNS)
