= 2021 Central Arkansas Bears baseball team =

American college baseball season

2021 Central Arkansas Bears baseball
- Conference: Southland Conference
- Record: 23–28 (18–22 Southland)
- Head coach: Allen Gum (11th season)
- Assistant coaches: Nick Harlan; Justin Cunningham
- Home stadium: Bear Stadium

2021 Southland Conference baseball standings
	Conf.				Overall
Team	W		L	PCT	W		L	PCT
Abilene Christian ‍†‍‍	25	–	13	.658	36	–	21	.632
Texas A&M–Corpus Christi ‍‍‍	20	–	14	.588	25	–	29	.463
New Orleans ‍‍‍	23	–	17	.575	29	–	28	.509
Sam Houston State ‍‍‍	20	–	15	.571	30	–	25	.545
Southeastern Louisiana ‍‍‍	22	–	17	.564	32	–	24	.571
Northwestern State ‍‍‍	20	–	16	.556	27	–	26	.509
McNeese State ‍‍‡‍^{y}	21	–	18	.538	32	–	30	.516
Lamar ‍‍‍	17	–	19	.472	25	–	23	.521
Central Arkansas ‍‍‍	18	–	22	.450	23	–	28	.451
Stephen F. Austin ‍‍‍	17	–	22	.436	20	–	31	.392
Incarnate Word ‍‍‍	17	–	23	.425	21	–	28	.429
Nicholls ‍‍‍	16	–	24	.400	21	–	34	.382
Houston Baptist ‍‍‍	11	–	27	.289	14	–	38	.269
† – Conference champion ‡ – Tournament champion y – Invited to the NCAA tournament As of June 6, 2021; Rankings from D1Baseball

The 2021 Central Arkansas Bears baseball team represented the University of Central Arkansas during the 2021 NCAA Division I baseball season. The Bears played their home games at Bear Stadium and were led by fifteenth–year head coach Allen Gum. They were members of the Southland Conference. This was Central Arkansas' final year in the Southland as they will be moving to the ASUN Conference for the 2022 season.

== Preseason ==
=== Southland Conference coaches poll ===
The Southland Conference coaches poll was released on February 11, 2021, and the Bears were picked to finish second in the conference with 247 votes and five first place votes.

Coaches poll
Predicted finish	Team	Votes (1st place)
1	Sam Houston State	276 (17)
2	Central Arkansas	247 (5)
3	McNeese State	244 (1)
4	Southeastern Louisiana	243 (3)
5	Northwestern State	193
6	Texas A&M–Corpus Christi	146
7	Incarnate Word	144
8	Nicholls	108
9	New Orleans	101
10	Abilene Christian	98
11	Stephen F. Austin	92
12	Lamar	87
13	Houston Baptist	49

=== Preseason All-Southland Team & honors ===
==== First Team ====
- Ryan Flores (UIW, 1st Base)
- Nate Fisbeck (MCNS, 2nd Base)
- Beau Orlando (UCA, 3rd Base)
- JC Correa (LAMR, Shortstop)
- Gavin Johnson (SHSU, Catcher)
- Clayton Rasbeary (MCNS, Designated Hitter)
- Sean Arnold (UIW, Outfielder)
- Brandon Bena (HBU, Outfielder)
- Colton Cowser (SHSU, Outfielder)
- Noah Cameron (UCA, Pitcher)
- Will Dion (MCNS, Pitcher)
- Kyle Gruller (HBU, Pitcher)
- Conner Williams (UCA, Pitcher)
- Itchy Burts (TAMUCC, Utility)

==== Second Team ====
- Preston Faulkner (SELA, 1st Base)
- Logan Berlof (LAMR, 2nd Base)
- Anthony Quirion (LAMR, 3rd Base)
- Reid Bourque (MCNS, Shortstop)
- Chris Sandberg (NICH, Catcher)
- Lee Thomas (UIW, Designated Hitter)
- Josh Ragan (UCA, Outfielder)
- Jack Rogers (SHSU, Outfielder)
- Tyler Smith (NSU, Outfielder)
- John Gaddis (TAMUCC, Pitcher)
- Gavin Stone (UCA, Pitcher)
- Luke Taggart (UIW, Pitcher)
- Jeremy Rodriguez (SFA, Pitcher)
- Jake Dickerson (MCNS, Utility)

== Roster ==
2021 Central Arkansas Bears roster
Pitchers: 11 Brady Walker - Redshirt Freshman; 12 Mark Moyer - Senior; 14 John Breaux - Sophomore; 15 Trent Gregson - Freshman; 16 Brad Verel - Redshirt Freshman; 18 Tyler Cleveland - Redshirt Freshman; 21 Ryan Johnston - Junior; 24 Conner Williams - Senior; 28 Jack Haley - Freshman; 30 Tyler Navarro - Junior; 32 Logan Gilbertson - Junior; 33 Cole Halpin - Junior; 34 Dillan Janak - Sophomore; 35 Jackson Kraus - Freshman; 37 Andrew Shoultz - Sophomore; 38 Noah Cameron - Sophomore; 39 Jesse Barker - Freshman; 41 Tate Busey - Freshman; 43 Brant Morris - Freshman; 49 Ryan Hallstrom - Freshman; 50 Kaydon Patrick - Freshman; 51 Wes Sutton - Freshman; 52 Eli Thomas - Freshman	Catchers: 10 Beau Orlando - Senior; 25 Nathaniel Sagdahl - Senior; 26 Andrew Pollum - Redshirt Freshman; 31 A. J. Mendolia - Freshman; 36 Connor Flagg - Freshman; Infielders: 2 Ramon Vingochea - Sophomore; 3 RJ Pearson - Junior; 6 Taylor Daniell - Junior; 8 Coby Potvin - Senior; 13 Christian Brasher - Senior; 17 Rylan Meek - Junior; 20 Benny Ayala - Junior; 27 Tanner Leonard - Freshman; 40 Hunter Hicks - Sophomore; 42 Brock Kuehler - Freshman; 44 Cade White - Freshman; 47 Avery Williams - Freshman; Outfielders: 1 Kolby Johnson - Sophomore; 5 Kinner Brasher - Junior; 9 Alonso Bibiano - Senior; 19 Connor Emmet - Junior; 23 Drew Sturgeon - Freshman

=== Coaching staff ===
2021 Central Arkansas Bears coaching staff
- Allen Gum – Head coach – 11th year
- Nick Harlan – Associate head coach/pitching coach – 8th year
- Justin Cunninghamn – Assistant head coach/recruiting coordinator – 4th year
- Hayden Simpson – Volunteer assistant coach

== Schedule and results ==
Legend
	Central Arkansas win
	Central Arkansas loss
	Postponement/Cancelation/Suspensions
**Bold**	Central Arkansas team member

2021 Central Arkansas Bears baseball game log
Regular season (23-28)

February (1-2)
Date	Opponent	Rank	Site/stadium	Score	Win	Loss	Save	TV	Attendance	Overall record	SLC Record
Feb. 21	Western Illinois		Bear Stadium • Conway, AR	Game cancelled							
Feb. 22	Western Illinois		Bear Stadium • Conway, AR	Game cancelled							
Feb. 22	Western Illinois		Bear Stadium • Conway, AR	Game cancelled							
Feb. 26	at Missouri State		Hammons Field • Springfield, MO	**L** 1-6	Russell (1-0)	**Moyer** (0-1)	None		439	0-1	
Feb. 27	at Missouri State		Hammons Field • Springfield, MO	**W** 5-2	**Janak** (1-0)	Viertel (0-1)	**Cleveland** (1)		815	1-1	
Feb. 28	at Missouri State		Hammons Field • Springfield, MO	**L** 2-12	Wiley (1-0)	**Johnston** (0-1)	None		420	1-2	

March (8-10)
Date	Opponent	Rank	Site/stadium	Score	Win	Loss	Save	TV	Attendance	Overall record	SLC Record
Mar. 3	at Little Rock		Gary Hogan Field • Little Rock, AR	**L** 3-5	Evans (1-0)	**Gregson** (0-1)	Barkley (1)		294	1-3	
Mar. 5	Tarleton State		• ConwBear Stadium ay, AR	**W** 6-1	**Moyer** (1-1)	Pinedo (1-2)	**Cleveland** (2)		210	2-3	
Mar. 6	Tarleton State		Bear Stadium • Conway, AR	**W** 19-2	**Johnston** (1-1)	Gagnon (0-3)	None		245	3-3	
Mar. 7	Missouri State		Bear Stadium • Conway, AR	**L** 9-15	Wiley (2-0)	**Cleveland** (0-1)	None		256	3-4	
Mar. 12	Abilene Christian		Bear Stadium • Conway, AR	**L** 8-9 (11 inns)	Riley (4-0)	**Cleveland** (0-2)	None		265	3-5	0-1
Mar. 13	Abilene Christian		Bear Stadium • Conway, AR	**L** 4-5	Cervantes (2-0)	**Johnston** (1-2)	Huffing (1)		274	3-6	0-2
Mar. 13	Abilene Christian		Bear Stadium • Conway, AR	**W** 6-3	**Janak** (2-0)	Stephenson (0-3)	**Cleveland** (3)		232	4-6	1-2
Mar. 14	Abilene Christian		Bear Stadium • Conway, AR	**W** 9-8	**Gilbertson** (1-0)	Morgan (0-1)	**Cleveland** (4)		284	5-6	2-2
Mar. 19	at Lamar		Vincent–Beck Stadium • Beaumont, TX	**L** 5-7	Michael (1-0)	**Moyer** (1-2)	Dallas (6)		785	5-7	2-3
Mar. 20	at Lamar		Vincent–Beck Stadium • Beaumont, TX	**W** 5-2	**Cleveland** (1-2)	Bravo (2-1)	None		805	6-7	3-3
Mar. 20	at Lamar		Vincent–Beck Stadium • Beaumont, TX	**L** 2-7	Palmer (2-0)	**Janak** (2-1)	None		805	6-8	3-4
Mar. 21	at Lamar		Vincent–Beck Stadium • Beaumont, TX	**W** 6-1	**Cleveland** (2-2)	Johnson (1-1)	None		658	7-8	4-4
Mar. 23	at No. 4 Ole Miss		Swayze Field • Oxford, MS	**L** 2-5	Mallitz (2-1)	**Johnston** (1-3)	Broadway (4)	SECN+	6,847	7-9	
Mar. 26	at Incarnate Word		Sullivan Field • San Antonio, TX	**W** 12-7	**Haley** (1-0)	Rollins (1-2)	**Gregson** (1)		82	8-9	5-4
Mar. 27	at Incarnate Word		Sullivan Field • San Antonio, TX	**L** 11-12	Garza (2-0)	**Verel** (0-1)	None		115	8-10	5-5
Mar. 27	at Incarnate Word		Sullivan Field • San Antonio, TX	**L** 2-10	McElmeel (2-0)	**Janak** (2-2)	Hayward (1)		115	8-11	5-6
Mar. 28	at Incarnate Word		Sullivan Field • San Antonio, TX	**W** 4-3	**Cleveland** (3-2)	Martinez (0-1)	None		92	9-11	6-6
Mar. 30	at No. 2 Arkansas		Baum–Walker Stadium • Fayetteville, AR	**L** 8-21	Ramage (1-1)	**Janak** (2-3)	None	SECN+	5,735	9-12	

April (6-10)
Date	Opponent	Rank	Site/stadium	Score	Win	Loss	Save	TV	Attendance	Overall record	SLC Record
Apr. 1	Sam Houston State		Bear Stadium • Conway, AR	**L** 2-3	Davis (4-1)	**Williams** (0-1)	Lusk (3)		185	9-13	6-7
Apr. 2	Sam Houston State		Bear Stadium • Conway, AR	**L** 0-2	Robinson (2-1)	**Moyer** (1-3)	Lusk (4)		122	9-14	6-8
Apr. 2	Sam Houston State		Bear Stadium • Conway, AR	**L** 1-3	Dillard (1-3)	**Busey** (0-1)	Lusk (5)		155	9-15	6-9
Apr. 3	Sam Houston State		Bear Stadium • Conway, AR	**L** 4-10	Atkinson (3-1)	**Gilbertson** (1-1)	None		258	9-16	6-10
Apr. 6	at Arkansas State		Tomlinson Stadium–Kell Field • Jonesboro, AR	Game postponed							
Apr. 9	at No. 14 Oklahoma State		O'Brate Stadium • Stillwater, OK	Game cancelled							
Apr. 10	at No. 14 Oklahoma State		O'Brate Stadium • Stillwater, OK	Game cancelled							
Apr. 11	at No. 14 Oklahoma State		O'Brate Stadium • Stillwater, OK	Game cancelled							
Apr. 14	Little Rock		Bear Stadium • Conway, AR	**W** 4-2	**Moyer** (2-3)	Beardsley (0-1)	**Cleveland** (5)		345	10-16	
Apr. 16	at Texas A&M–Corpus Christi		Chapman Field • Corpus Christi, TX	**L** 4-7	Ramirez (3-2)	**Cleveland** (3-3)	None		239	10-17	6-11
Apr. 17	at Texas A&M–Corpus Christi		Chapman Field • Corpus Christi, TX	**L** 1-2	Thomas (2-1)	**Moyer** (2-4)	Bird (1)		197	10-18	6-12
Apr. 18	at Texas A&M–Corpus Christi		Chapman Field • Corpus Christi, TX	**L** 1-5	Gaddis (2-3)	**Gilbertson** (1-2)	None		167	10-19	6-13
Apr. 18	at Texas A&M–Corpus Christi		Chapman Field • Corpus Christi, TX	**L** 4-10	Ramirez (4-1)	**Busey** (0-2)	None		167	10-20	6-14
Apr. 20	Arkansas State		Bear Stadium • Conway, AR	**W** 5-3	**Shoultz** (1-0)	Albat (0-1)	**Cleveland** (6)		245	11-20	
Apr. 23	Stephen F. Austin		Bear Stadium • Conway, AR	**W** 10-9 (10 inns)	**Cleveland** (4-3)	Koch (1-1)	None		245	12-20	7-14
Apr. 24	Stephen F. Austin		Bear Stadium • Conway, AR	**L** 2-8	Todd (3-2)	**Moyer** (2-5)	None		325	12-21	7-15
Apr. 25	Stephen F. Austin		Bear Stadium • Conway, AR	**W** 7-6	**Navarro** (1-0)	Gauthe (1-2)	None		310	13-21	8-15
Apr. 25	Stephen F. Austin		Bear Stadium • Conway, AR	**W** 9-0	**Cleveland** (5-3)	Sgambelluri (2-3)	None		310	14-21	9-15
Apr. 30	Northwestern State		Bear Stadium • Conway, AR	**L** 4-8	Harmon (4-2)	**Gilbertson** (1-3)	Brown (3)		295	14-22	9-16
Apr. 30	Northwestern State		Bear Stadium • Conway, AR	**W** 3-1	**Williams** (1-1)	Carver (5-4)	**Cleveland** (7)		348	15-22	10-16

May (8–6)
Date	Opponent	Rank	Site/stadium	Score	Win	Loss	Save	TV	Attendance	Overall record	SLC Record
May 1	Northwestern State		Bear Stadium • Conway, AR	**W** 9-2	**Moyer** (3-5)	David (2-5)	None		348	16-22	11-16
May 1	Northwestern State		Bear Stadium • Conway, AR	**W** 13-8	**Verel** (1-1)	Ohnoutka (2-1)	**Navarro** (1)		348	17-22	12-16
May 7	at New Orleans		Maestri Field at Privateer Park • New Orleans, LA	**W** 15-5	**Verel** (2-1)	Erbe (1-4)	**Gilbertson** (1)		437	18-22	13-16
May 8	at New Orleans		Maestri Field at Privateer Park • New Orleans, LA	**L** 0-11	Turpin (8-2)	**Moyer** (3-6)	None		492	18-23	13-17
May 8	at New Orleans		Maestri Field at Privateer Park • New Orleans, LA	**W** 8-0	**Williams** (2-1)	Mitchell (4-2)	**Cleveland** (8)		358	19-23	14-17
May 9	at New Orleans		Maestri Field at Privateer Park • New Orleans, LA	**L** 3-4	LeBlanc (1-3)	**Gregson** (0-2)	Seroski (10)		371	19-24	14-18
May 11	Arkansas–Pine Bluff		Bear Stadium • Conway, AR	Game cancelled							
May 14	at Houston Baptist		Husky Field • Houston, TX	**L** 1-7	Coats (3-6)	**Navarro** (1-1)	None			19-25	14-19
May 14	at Houston Baptist		Husky Field • Houston, TX	**W** 8-6	**Moyer** (4-6)	Zarella (0-6)	**Cleveland** (9)		400	20-25	15-19
May 15	at Houston Baptist		Husky Field • Houston, TX	**W** 3-2	**Cleveland** (6-3)	Reitmeyer (2-4)	None			21-25	16-19
May 15	at Houston Baptist		Husky Field • Houston, TX	**L** 6-8	Smitherman (1-2)	**Janak** (2-4)	None		400	21-26	16-20
May 20	McNeese State		Bear Stadium • Conway, AR	**W** 8-1	**Moyer** (5-6)	Hudgens (1-3)	None		348	22-26	17-20
May 21	McNeese State		Bear Stadium • Conway, AR	**L** 1-6	Dion (8-4)	**Williams** (2-2)	None		304	22-27	17-21
May 21	McNeese State		Bear Stadium • Conway, AR	**L** 5-6 (10 inns)	Foster (1-3)	**Williams** (2-3)	None		255	22-28	17-22
May 22	McNeese State		Bear Stadium • Conway, AR	**W** 5-4	**Gilbertson** (2-3)	Abraham (3-3)	**Verel** (1)		410	23-28	18-22

Schedule source:

*Rankings are based on the team's current ranking in the D1Baseball poll.

== Postseason ==
=== Conference accolades ===
- Player of the Year: Colton Cowser – SHSU
- Hitter of the Year: Colton Eager – ACU
- Pitcher of the Year: Will Dion – MCNS
- Relief Pitcher of the Year: Tyler Cleveland – UCA
- Freshman of the Year: Brennan Stuprich – SELA
- Newcomer of the Year: Grayson Tatrow – ACU
- Clay Gould Coach of the Year: Rick McCarty – ACU

All Conference First Team

- Chase Kemp (LAMR)
- Nate Fisbeck (MCNS)
- Itchy Burts (TAMUCC)
- Bash Randle (ACU)
- Mitchell Dickson (ACU)
- Lee Thomas (UIW)
- Colton Cowser (SHSU)
- Colton Eager (ACU)
- Clayton Rasbeary (MCNS)
- Will Dion (MCNS)
- Brennan Stuprich (SELA)
- Will Warren (SELA)
- Tyler Cleveland (UCA)
- Anthony Quirion (LAMR)

All Conference Second Team

- Preston Faulkner (SELA)
- Daunte Stuart (NSU)
- Kasten Furr (UNO)
- Evan Keller (SELA)
- Skylar Black (SFA)
- Tre Obregon III (MCNS)
- Jack Rogers (SHSU)
- Pearce Howard (UNO)
- Grayson Tatrow (ACU)
- Chris Turpin (UNO)
- John Gaddis (TAMUCC)
- Trevin Michael (LAMR)
- Caleb Seroski (UNO)
- Jacob Burke (SELA)

All Conference Third Team

- Luke Marbach (TAMUCC)
- Salo Iza (UNO)
- Austin Cain (NICH)
- Darren Willis (UNO)
- Ryan Snell (LAMR)
- Tommy Cruz (ACU)
- Tyler Finke (SELA)
- Payton Harden (MCNS)
- Mike Williams (TAMUCC)
- Cal Carver (NSU)
- Levi David (NSU)
- Dominic Robinson (SHSU)
- Jack Dallas (LAMR)
- Brett Hammit (ACU)

All Conference Defensive Team

- Luke Marbach (TAMUCC)
- Nate Fisebeck (MCNS)
- Anthony Quirion (LAMR)
- Darren Willis (UNO)
- Gaby Cruz (SELA)
- Julian Gonzales (MCNS)
- Colton Cowser (SHSU)
- Avery George (LAMR)
- Will Dion (MCNS)
