= 2021 Northwestern State Demons baseball team =

American college baseball season

2021 Northwestern State Demons baseball
- Conference: Southland Conference
- Record: 27–26 (20–16 Southland)
- Head coach: Bobby Barbier (5th season)
- Assistant coaches: Chris Bertrand; Spencer Goodwin
- Home stadium: H. Alvin Brown–C. C. Stroud Field

2021 Southland Conference baseball standings
	Conf.				Overall
Team	W		L	PCT	W		L	PCT
Abilene Christian ‍†‍‍	25	–	13	.658	36	–	21	.632
Texas A&M–Corpus Christi ‍‍‍	20	–	14	.588	25	–	29	.463
New Orleans ‍‍‍	23	–	17	.575	29	–	28	.509
Sam Houston State ‍‍‍	20	–	15	.571	30	–	25	.545
Southeastern Louisiana ‍‍‍	22	–	17	.564	32	–	24	.571
Northwestern State ‍‍‍	20	–	16	.556	27	–	26	.509
McNeese State ‍‍‡‍^{y}	21	–	18	.538	32	–	30	.516
Lamar ‍‍‍	17	–	19	.472	25	–	23	.521
Central Arkansas ‍‍‍	18	–	22	.450	23	–	28	.451
Stephen F. Austin ‍‍‍	17	–	22	.436	20	–	31	.392
Incarnate Word ‍‍‍	17	–	23	.425	21	–	28	.429
Nicholls ‍‍‍	16	–	24	.400	21	–	34	.382
Houston Baptist ‍‍‍	11	–	27	.289	14	–	38	.269
† – Conference champion ‡ – Tournament champion y – Invited to the NCAA tournament As of June 6, 2021; Rankings from D1Baseball

The 2021 Northwestern State Demons baseball team represented Northwestern State University during the 2021 NCAA Division I baseball season. The Demons played their home games at H. Alvin Brown–C. C. Stroud Field and were led by fifth–year head coach Bobby Barbier. They were members of the Southland Conference.

== Preseason ==
=== Southland Conference Coaches Poll ===
The Southland Conference Coaches Poll was released on February 11, 2021 and the Demons were picked to finish fifth in the conference with 193 votes.

Coaches poll
Predicted finish	Team	Votes (1st place)
1	Sam Houston State	276 (17)
2	Central Arkansas	247 (5)
3	McNeese State	244 (1)
4	Southeastern Louisiana	243 (3)
5	Northwestern State	193
6	Texas A&M–Corpus Christi	146
7	Incarnate Word	144
8	Nicholls	108
9	New Orleans	101
10	Abilene Christian	98
11	Stephen F. Austin	92
12	Lamar	87
13	Houston Baptist	49

=== Preseason All-Southland Team & Honors ===
==== First Team ====
- Ryan Flores (UIW, 1st Base)
- Nate Fisbeck (MCNS, 2nd Base)
- Beau Orlando (UCA, 3rd Base)
- JC Correa (LAMR, Shortstop)
- Gavin Johnson (SHSU, Catcher)
- Clayton Rasbeary (MCNS, Designated Hitter)
- Sean Arnold (UIW, Outfielder)
- Brandon Bena (HBU, Outfielder)
- Colton Cowser (SHSU, Outfielder)
- Noah Cameron (UCA, Pitcher)
- Will Dion (MCNS, Pitcher)
- Kyle Gruller (HBU, Pitcher)
- Conner Williams (UCA, Pitcher)
- Itchy Burts (TAMUCC, Utility)

==== Second Team ====
- Preston Faulkner (SELA, 1st Base)
- Logan Berlof (LAMR, 2nd Base)
- Anthony Quirion (LAMR, 3rd Base)
- Reid Bourque (MCNS, Shortstop)
- Chris Sandberg (NICH, Catcher)
- Lee Thomas (UIW, Designated Hitter)
- Josh Ragan (UCA, Outfielder)
- Jack Rogers (SHSU, Outfielder)
- Tyler Smith (NSU, Outfielder)
- John Gaddis (TAMUCC, Pitcher)
- Gavin Stone (UCA, Pitcher)
- Luke Taggart (UIW, Pitcher)
- Jeremy Rodriguez (SFA, Pitcher)
- Jake Dickerson (MCNS, Utility)

== Roster ==
2021 Northwestern State Demons baseball team
Players
Coaches

#	Pos.	Name	B/T	Height	Weight	Year	Home town
1	OF	Larson Fontenot	R/R	6 ft 2 in (1.88 m)	210 lb (95 kg)	Jr	St. Amant, Louisiana
2	RHP	Ethan Francis	L/R	5 ft 11 in (1.8 m)	175 lb (79 kg)	So	Miscouche, Canada
3		Lenni Kunert	R/R	5 ft 8 in (1.73 m)	170 lb (77 kg)	Sr	Watson, Louisiana
4	OF	Kendall Foster	L/L	5 ft 9 in (1.75 m)	180 lb (82 kg)	So	Prosper, Texas
5	INF	Jake Haze	S/R	5 ft 9 in (1.75 m)	165 lb (75 kg)	Fr	Highlands Ranch, Colorado
8	LHP	Reed Michel	R/L	6 ft 1 in (1.85 m)	180 lb (82 kg)	RS Sr	Meridian, Mississippi
9	INF	Hilton Brown	R/R	6 ft 2 in (1.88 m)	205 lb (93 kg)	So	San Antonio, Texas
11	OF	Ryan Zimmerman	L/R	6 ft 2 in (1.88 m)	198 lb (90 kg)	Jr	Mandeville, Louisiana
12	C	Cole Horton	L/R	5 ft 9 in (1.75 m)	190 lb (86 kg)	Fr	Bossier City, Louisiana
13	C	Marshall Skinner	R/R	6 ft 1 in (1.85 m)	210 lb (95 kg)	Sr	Cypress, Texas
14	OF	Gabe Colaianni	L/L	5 ft 10 in (1.78 m)	190 lb (86 kg)	Fr	Missouri City, Texas
15	INF	Lance Hicks	L/L	6 ft 1 in (1.85 m)	230 lb (104 kg)	Fr	Spring, Texas
16	RHP	Alex Makarewich	R/R	6 ft 0 in (1.83 m)	185 lb (84 kg)	Fr	Keller, Texas
18	LHP	Cal Carver	L/L	6 ft 3 in (1.91 m)	190 lb (86 kg)	So	San Antonio, Texas
19	INF	Daunte Stuart	R/R	5 ft 11 in (1.8 m)	180 lb (82 kg)	Fr	The Woodlands, Texas
20	C	Austin Kirkpatrick	R/R	6 ft 1 in (1.85 m)	180 lb (82 kg)	Jr	Parks, Louisiana
21	OF	Jacob Farrell	R/R	6 ft 1 in (1.85 m)	200 lb (91 kg)	RS Fr	Cypress, Texas
22	RHP	Ryan Olchoway	R/R	6 ft 3 in (1.91 m)	180 lb (82 kg)	So	Saskatoon, Canada
23	OF	Tyler Smith	L/L	5 ft 11 in (1.8 m)	180 lb (82 kg)	Sr	Franklinton, Louisiana
24	RHP	Josh Banes	R/R	5 ft 10 in (1.78 m)	185 lb (84 kg)	Jr	Learned, Mississippi
25	C	Tyler Thibodeaux	R/R	6 ft 1 in (1.85 m)	190 lb (86 kg)	RS So	Breaux Bridge, Louisiana
26	RHP	Donovan Ohnoutka	R/R	6 ft 1 in (1.85 m)	200 lb (91 kg)	Jr	Natchitoches, Louisiana
27	RHP	Peyton Graham	R/R	5 ft 11 in (1.8 m)	170 lb (77 kg)	Sr	Wylie, Texas
31	INF	Cameron Parikh	R/R	6 ft 2 in (1.88 m)	200 lb (91 kg)	So	Bossier City, Louisiana
32	INF	Cameron Horton	L/R	6 ft 3 in (1.91 m)	225 lb (102 kg)	Sr	Benton, Louisiana
33	INF	Peyton Davis	R/R	6 ft 4 in (1.93 m)	220 lb (100 kg)	Jr	Bossier City, Louisiana
34	RHP	Drayton Brown	R/R	6 ft 3 in (1.91 m)	215 lb (98 kg)	Fr	Nacogdoches, Texas
35	RHP	Micah Berens	R/R	6 ft 4 in (1.93 m)	235 lb (107 kg)	Fr	Fort Worth, Texas
36	RHP	Nik Millsap	R/R	6 ft 3 in (1.91 m)	190 lb (86 kg)	RS Fr	Southlake, Texas
37	LHP	Will Hine	R/L	6 ft 4 in (1.93 m)	215 lb (98 kg)	Jr	Benton, Louisiana
38	RHP	Evan Daigle	R/R	5 ft 11 in (1.8 m)	190 lb (86 kg)	Jr	Port Allen, Louisiana
39	LHP	Cameron Taylor	L/L	5 ft 11 in (1.8 m)	195 lb (88 kg)	Jr	Bossier City, Louisiana
40	RHP	Levi David	R/R	6 ft 5 in (1.96 m)	220 lb (100 kg)	So	Waxahachie, Texas
41	RHP	Andrew Cossio	R/R	6 ft 0 in (1.83 m)	187 lb (85 kg)	So	Spring, Texas
42	RHP	Thomas Sotile	L/R	6 ft 3 in (1.91 m)	190 lb (86 kg)	Fr	Baton Rouge, Louisiana
46	RHP	Johnathan Harmon	R/R	6 ft 5 in (1.96 m)	195 lb (88 kg)	Fr	Hornbeck, Louisiana
48	OF	Reese Lipoma	R/R	5 ft 10 in (1.78 m)	175 lb (79 kg)	Fr	Gonzales, Louisiana
54	OF	Jeffrey Elkins	R/R	5 ft 10 in (1.78 m)	195 lb (88 kg)	So	Lafayette, Louisiana

Head coach

Bobby Barbier (Northwestern State)

Assistant coach(es)

Chris Bertrand (LSU–Shreveport)
Spencer Goodwin (Northwestern State)
Dan Hlad (Northwestern State)

Legend

- (C) Team captain
- (S) Suspended
- (I) Ineligible
- Injured
- Current redshirt

Roster
Last update: 2021 June 20

== Schedule and results ==
Legend
	Northwestern State win
	Northwestern State loss
	Postponement/Cancelation/Suspensions
**Bold**	Northwestern State team member

2021 Northwestern State Demons baseball game log
Regular season (27-24)

February (3-4)
Date	Opponent	Rank	Site/stadium	Score	Win	Loss	Save	TV	Attendance	Overall record	SLC Record
Feb. 21	at Southern Miss		Pete Taylor Park • Hattiesburg, MS	**L** 1-5	Stanley (1-0)	**Harmon** (0-1)	Gillentine (1)			0-1	
Feb. 21	at Southern Miss		Pete Taylor Park • Hattiesburg, MS	**W** 7-1	**Makarewich** (1-0)	Best (0-1)	None			1-1	
Feb. 22	at Southern Miss		Pete Taylor Park • Hattiesburg, MS	**L** 0-10 (7 inns)	Boyd (1-0)	**David** (0-1)	None			1-2	
Feb. 24	at Louisiana–Monroe		Warhawk Field • Monroe, LA	**L** 2-5	Barlow (1-0)	**Banes** (0-1)	None		344	1-3	
Feb. 26	Tarleton State		H. Alvin Brown–C. C. Stroud Field • Natchitoches, LA	**L** 0-3	Pinedo (1-1)	**Harmon** (0-2)	None		525	1-4	
Feb. 27	Tarleton State		H. Alvin Brown–C. C. Stroud Field • Natchitoches, LA	**W** 2-1	**Carver** (1-0)	Gagnon (0-2)	**Brown** (1)		530	2-4	
Feb. 27	Tarleton State		H. Alvin Brown–C. C. Stroud Field • Natchitoches, LA	**W** 5-3	**Banes** (1-1)	Wood (0-1)	None		530	3-4	

March (7-8)
Date	Opponent	Rank	Site/stadium	Score	Win	Loss	Save	TV	Attendance	Overall record	SLC Record
Mar. 5	Austin Peay		H. Alvin Brown–C. C. Stroud Field • Natchitoches, LA	**W** 10-8	**Ohnoutka** (1-0)	O'Shoney (0-1)	None		285	4-4	
Mar. 6	Austin Peay		H. Alvin Brown–C. C. Stroud Field • Natchitoches, LA	'W 4-0	**Carver** (2-0)	Jula (0-3)	None		478	5-4	
Mar. 7	Austin Peay		H. Alvin Brown–C. C. Stroud Field • Natchitoches, LA	**L** 2-3	Martinez (1-1)	**Brown** (1-1)	Leob (1)		470	5-5	
Mar. 12	Incarnate Word		H. Alvin Brown–C. C. Stroud Field • Natchitoches, LA	**W** 5-4	**Harmon** (1-2)	Rollins (1-1)	**Makarewich** (1)		463	6-5	1-0
Mar. 13	Incarnate Word		H. Alvin Brown–C. C. Stroud Field • Natchitoches, LA	**L** 1-2	Zavala (2-0)	**Carver** (2-1)	None		305	6-6	1-1
Mar. 13	Incarnate Word		H. Alvin Brown–C. C. Stroud Field • Natchitoches, LA	**L** 2-3	Foral (1-0)	**Michel** (0-1)	None		305	6-7	1-2
Mar. 14	Incarnate Word		H. Alvin Brown–C. C. Stroud Field • Natchitoches, LA	**W** 6-5	**Daigle** (1-0)	Hayward (0-3)	None		427	7-7	2-2
Mar. 19	at Sam Houston State		Don Sanders Stadium • Huntsville, TX	'L 2-3	Lusk (1-1)	**Makarewich** (1-1)	None		412	7-8	2-3
Mar. 20	at Sam Houston State		Don Sanders Stadium • Huntsville, TX	**W** 3-1	**Carver** (3-1)	Egli (0-1)	None		412	8-8	3-3
Mar. 20	at Sam Houston State		Don Sanders Stadium • Huntsville, TX	**W** 3-2	**David** (1-1)	Robinson (0-1)	**Ohnoutka** (1)		412	9-8	4-3
Mar. 21	at Sam Houston State		Don Sanders Stadium • Huntsville, TX	**L** 3-6	Atkinson (1-1)	**Michel** (0-2)	Lusk (1)		412	9-9	4-4
Mar. 26	South Alabama		H. Alvin Brown–C. C. Stroud Field • Natchitoches, LA	**L** 6-8	Smith (2-0)	**Makarewich** (1-2)	None		491	9-10	
Mar. 27	South Alabama		H. Alvin Brown–C. C. Stroud Field • Natchitoches, LA	**L** 5-6	Dalton (4-2)	**David** (1-2)	Samaniego (4)		434	9-11	
Mar. 28	South Alabama		H. Alvin Brown–C. C. Stroud Field • Natchitoches, LA	**L** 1-12	Booker (2-0)	**Graham** (0-1)	None		520	9-12	
Mar. 30	LSU Alexandria		H. Alvin Brown–C. C. Stroud Field • Natchitoches, LA	**W** 7-3	**Millsap** (1-0)	Noel (0-1)	None		402	10-12	

April (12-7)
Date	Opponent	Rank	Site/stadium	Score	Win	Loss	Save	TV	Attendance	Overall record	SLC Record
Apr. 1	at Abilene Christian		Crutcher Scott Field • Abilene, TX	**W** 8-2	**Brown** (1-1)	Riley (5-1)	None		231	11-12	5-4
Apr. 2	at Abilene Christian		Crutcher Scott Field • Abilene, TX	**L** 0-11 (7 inns)	Cervantes (5-0)	**Carver** (3-2)	None		242	11-13	5-5
Apr. 2	at Abilene Christian		Crutcher Scott Field • Abilene, TX	**W** 5-3	**David** (2-2)	Stephenson (0-4)	None		286	12-13	6-5
Apr. 3	at Abilene Christian		Crutcher Scott Field • Abilene, TX	**W** 6-5	**Taylor** (1-0)	Carlton (0-1)	None		298	13-13	7-5
Apr. 10	Lamar		H. Alvin Brown–C. C. Stroud Field • Natchitoches, LA	**W** 11-7	**Harmon** (2-2)	Michael (2-2)	**Brown** (2)		510	14-13	8-5
Apr. 10	Lamar		H. Alvin Brown–C. C. Stroud Field • Natchitoches, LA	**L** 4-16 (8 inns)	Bravo (3-1)	**Carver** (3-3)	None		510	14-14	8-6
Apr. 11	Lamar		H. Alvin Brown–C. C. Stroud Field • Natchitoches, LA	**L** 2-3	Ekness (1-1)	**David** (2-3)	Dallas (7)			14-15	8-7
Apr. 11	Lamar		H. Alvin Brown–C. C. Stroud Field • Natchitoches, LA	**W** 8-1					15-15	9-7	
Apr. 16	at Houston Baptist		Husky Field • Houston, TX	**L** 6-7	Morris (3-0)	**Brown** (1-2)	None		200	15-16	9-8
Apr. 17	at Houston Baptist		Husky Field • Houston, TX	**W** 3-2	**Carver** (4-3)	Burch (2-1)	None		400	16-16	10-8
Apr. 17	at Houston Baptist		Husky Field • Houston, TX	**L** 2-6	Coats (2-4)	**David** (2-4)	Reitmeyer (3)		400	16-17	10-9
Apr. 18	at Houston Baptist		Husky Field • Houston, TX	**W** 6-5	**Banes** (2-1)	Morris (3-1)	None		200	17-17	11-9
Apr. 24	Nicholls		H. Alvin Brown–C. C. Stroud Field • Natchitoches, LA	**W** 7-3	**Harmon** (3-2)	Gearing (3-3)	None		501	18-17	12-9
Apr. 24	Nicholls		H. Alvin Brown–C. C. Stroud Field • Natchitoches, LA	**W** 13-6	**Carver** (5-3)	Kilcrease (2-5)	None		501	19-17	13-9
Apr. 25	Nicholls		H. Alvin Brown–C. C. Stroud Field • Natchitoches, LA	**W** 3-2	**Michel** (2-2)	Balado (2-1)	None		511	20-17	14-9
Apr. 25	Nicholls		H. Alvin Brown–C. C. Stroud Field • Natchitoches, LA	**W** 2-1	**Ohnoutka** (2-0)	Mancuso (0-1)	**Makarewich** (2)		511	21-17	15-9
Apr. 30	at Central Arkansas Bears		Bear Stadium • Conway, AR	**W** 8-4	**Harmon** (4-2)	Gilbertson (1-3)	**Brown** (3)		295	22-17	16-9
Apr. 30	at Central Arkansas		Bear Stadium • Conway, AR	**L** 1-3	Williams (1-1)	**Carver** (5-4)	Cleveland (7)		348	22-18	16-10

May (5–6)
Date	Opponent	Rank	Site/stadium	Score	Win	Loss	Save	TV	Attendance	Overall record	SLC Record
May 1	at Central Arkansas		Bear Stadium • Conway, AR	**L** 2-9	Moyer (3-5)	**David** (2-5)	None		348	22-19	16-11
May 1	at Central Arkansas		Bear Stadium • Conway, AR	**L** 8-13	Verel (1-1)	**Ohnoutka** (2-1)	Navarro (1)		348	22-20	16-12
May 7	McNeese State		H. Alvin Brown–C. C. Stroud Field • Natchitoches, LA	**L** 1-7	Dion (6-4)	**Harmon** (4-3)	None		458	22-21	16-13
May 7	McNeese State		H. Alvin Brown–C. C. Stroud Field • Natchitoches, LA	**W** 4-3	**Carver** (6-4)	Hudgens (0-2)	**Brown** (4)		458	23-21	17-13
May 8	McNeese State		H. Alvin Brown–C. C. Stroud Field • Natchitoches, LA	**W** 4-3	**Brown** (2-2)	Foster (0-2)	None		510	24-21	18-13
May 8	McNeese State		H. Alvin Brown–C. C. Stroud Field • Natchitoches, LA	**W** 6-5	**Taylor** (2-0)	Vega (1-5)	None		510	25-21	19-13
May 14	at Stephen F. Austin		Jaycees Field • Nacogdoches, TX	**L** 3-8	Emmons (2-0)	**Carver** (6-5)	Koch (1)		185	25-22	19-14
May 15	at Stephen F. Austin		Jaycees Field • Nacogdoches, TX	**L** 4-9	Lee (2-2)	**Ohnoutka** (2-2)	None		151	25-23	19-15
May 15	at Stephen F. Austin		Jaycees Field • Nacogdoches, TX	**W** 5-4	**Berens** (1-0)	Mangus (0-1)	**Brown** (5)		140	26-23	20-15
May 16	at Stephen F. Austin		Jaycees Field • Nacogdoches, TX	**L** 2-7	Cuellar (1-1)	**Harmon** (4-4)	None		210	26-24	20-16
May 18	at LSU		Alex Box Stadium, Skip Bertman Field • Baton Rouge, LA	**W** 7-3	**Francis** (1-0)	Hellmers (6-2)	**Brown** (6)	SECN+	3,274	27-24	
May 21	Texas A&M–Corpus Christi		H. Alvin Brown–C. C. Stroud Field • Natchitoches, LA	Game cancelled							
May 21	Texas A&M–Corpus Christi		H. Alvin Brown–C. C. Stroud Field • Natchitoches, LA	Game cancelled							
May 22	Texas A&M–Corpus Christi		H. Alvin Brown–C. C. Stroud Field • Natchitoches, LA	Game cancelled							
May 22	Texas A&M–Corpus Christi		H. Alvin Brown–C. C. Stroud Field • Natchitoches, LA	Game cancelled							

Postseason (0–2)

SBC Tournament (0–2)
Date	Opponent	Seed/Rank	Site/stadium	Score	Win	Loss	Save	TV	Attendance	Overall record	Tournament record
May 26	vs. (3) Southeastern Louisiana	(6)	Pat Kenelly Diamond at Alumni Field • Hammond, LA	**L** 1-2	Shaffer (3-3)	**Brown** (2-3)	None	ESPN+	1,467	27-25	0-1
May 27	vs. (2) New Orleans	(6)	Pat Kenelly Diamond at Alumni Field • Hammond, LA	**L** 1-14 (7 inns)	Mitchell (5-2)	**David** (2-6)	None	ESPN+	914	27-26	0-2

Schedule source:

*Rankings are based on the team's current ranking in the D1Baseball poll.

== Postseason ==
=== Conference accolades ===
- Player of the Year: Colton Cowser – SHSU
- Hitter of the Year: Colton Eager – ACU
- Pitcher of the Year: Will Dion – MCNS
- Relief Pitcher of the Year: Tyler Cleveland – UCA
- Freshman of the Year: Brennan Stuprich – SELA
- Newcomer of the Year: Grayson Tatrow – ACU
- Clay Gould Coach of the Year: Rick McCarty – ACU

All Conference First Team

- Chase Kemp (LAMR)
- Nate Fisbeck (MCNS)
- Itchy Burts (TAMUCC)
- Bash Randle (ACU)
- Mitchell Dickson (ACU)
- Lee Thomas (UIW)
- Colton Cowser (SHSU)
- Colton Eager (ACU)
- Clayton Rasbeary (MCNS)
- Will Dion (MCNS)
- Brennan Stuprich (SELA)
- Will Warren (SELA)
- Tyler Cleveland (UCA)
- Anthony Quirion (LAMR)

All Conference Second Team

- Preston Faulkner (SELA)
- Daunte Stuart (NSU)
- Kasten Furr (UNO)
- Evan Keller (SELA)
- Skylar Black (SFA)
- Tre Obregon III (MCNS)
- Jack Rogers (SHSU)
- Pearce Howard (UNO)
- Grayson Tatrow (ACU)
- Chris Turpin (UNO)
- John Gaddis (TAMUCC)
- Trevin Michael (LAMR)
- Caleb Seroski (UNO)
- Jacob Burke (SELA)

All Conference Third Team

- Luke Marbach (TAMUCC)
- Salo Iza (UNO)
- Austin Cain (NICH)
- Darren Willis (UNO)
- Ryan Snell (LAMR)
- Tommy Cruz (ACU)
- Tyler Finke (SELA)
- Payton Harden (MCNS)
- Mike Williams (TAMUCC)
- Cal Carver (NSU)
- Levi David (NSU)
- Dominic Robinson (SHSU)
- Jack Dallas (LAMR)
- Brett Hammit (ACU)

All Conference Defensive Team

- Luke Marbach (TAMUCC)
- Nate Fisebeck (MCNS)
- Anthony Quirion (LAMR)
- Darren Willis (UNO)
- Gaby Cruz (SELA)
- Julian Gonzales (MCNS)
- Colton Cowser (SHSU)
- Avery George (LAMR)
- Will Dion (MCNS)
