= 2021 Texas A&M–Corpus Christi Islanders baseball team =

American college baseball season

2021 Texas A&M–Corpus Christi Islanders baseball
- Conference: Southland Conference
- Record: 25–29 (20–14 Southland)
- Head coach: Scott Malone (14th season)
- Assistant coaches: Marty Smith; Seth LaRue
- Home stadium: Chapman Field

2021 Southland Conference baseball standings
	Conf.				Overall
Team	W		L	PCT	W		L	PCT
Abilene Christian ‍†‍‍	25	–	13	.658	36	–	21	.632
Texas A&M–Corpus Christi ‍‍‍	20	–	14	.588	25	–	29	.463
New Orleans ‍‍‍	23	–	17	.575	29	–	28	.509
Sam Houston State ‍‍‍	20	–	15	.571	30	–	25	.545
Southeastern Louisiana ‍‍‍	22	–	17	.564	32	–	24	.571
Northwestern State ‍‍‍	20	–	16	.556	27	–	26	.509
McNeese State ‍‍‡‍^{y}	21	–	18	.538	32	–	30	.516
Lamar ‍‍‍	17	–	19	.472	25	–	23	.521
Central Arkansas ‍‍‍	18	–	22	.450	23	–	28	.451
Stephen F. Austin ‍‍‍	17	–	22	.436	20	–	31	.392
Incarnate Word ‍‍‍	17	–	23	.425	21	–	28	.429
Nicholls ‍‍‍	16	–	24	.400	21	–	34	.382
Houston Baptist ‍‍‍	11	–	27	.289	14	–	38	.269
† – Conference champion ‡ – Tournament champion y – Invited to the NCAA tournament As of June 6, 2021; Rankings from D1Baseball

The 2021 Texas A&M–Corpus Christi Islanders baseball team represented Texas A&M University–Corpus Christi during the 2021 NCAA Division I baseball season. The Islanders played their home games at Chapman Field and were led by fourteenth–year head coach Scott Malone. They were members of the Southland Conference.

== Preseason ==
=== Southland Conference Coaches Poll ===
The Southland Conference Coaches Poll was released on February 11, 2021 and the Islanders were picked to finish sixth in the conference with 146 votes.

Coaches poll
Predicted finish	Team	Votes (1st place)
1	Sam Houston State	276 (17)
2	Central Arkansas	247 (5)
3	McNeese State	244 (1)
4	Southeastern Louisiana	243 (3)
5	Northwestern State	193
6	Texas A&M–Corpus Christi	146
7	Incarnate Word	144
8	Nicholls	108
9	New Orleans	101
10	Abilene Christian	98
11	Stephen F. Austin	92
12	Lamar	87
13	Houston Baptist	49

== Roster ==
2021 Texas A&M–Corpus Christi Islanders baseball team
Players
Coaches

#	Pos.	Name	B/T	Height	Weight	Year	Home town
1	OF	Itchy Burts	L/R	5 ft 7 in (1.7 m)	180 lb (82 kg)	Sr	League City, Texas
2	INF	Luke Marbach	R/R	5 ft 11 in (1.8 m)	175 lb (79 kg)	Sr	New Braunfels, Texas
3	LHP	Tre Jones	L/L	6 ft 2 in (1.88 m)	195 lb (88 kg)	Fr	Houston, Texas
4	INF	Diego Johnson	R/R	5 ft 10 in (1.78 m)	170 lb (77 kg)	Fr	Carrollton, Texas
5	INF	Cole Fluta	R/R	5 ft 7 in (1.7 m)	155 lb (70 kg)	Sr	Middletown, New Jersey
6	LHP	John Gaddis	L/L	6 ft 0 in (1.83 m)	190 lb (86 kg)	Jr	Corpus Christi, Texas
7	RHP	Henry Bird	R/R	6 ft 2 in (1.88 m)	195 lb (88 kg)	Jr	Alvin, Texas
9	LHP	Dom Lopez	L/L	5 ft 9 in (1.75 m)	190 lb (86 kg)	Fr	Corpus Christi, Texas
10	INF	Brendan Ryan	L/R	6 ft 0 in (1.83 m)	185 lb (84 kg)	So	Leawood, Kansas
11	INF	Steven Rivera-Chijin	L/R	6 ft 0 in (1.83 m)	200 lb (91 kg)	Jr	Toa Baja, Puerto Rico
12	RHP	David Hankins	R/R	6 ft 4 in (1.93 m)	178 lb (81 kg)	Fr	Katy, Texas
13	C	Josh Caraway	R/R	6 ft 1 in (1.85 m)	216 lb (98 kg)	Fr	Roanoke, Texas
15	OF	Tristan Welch	R/R	6 ft 2 in (1.88 m)	190 lb (86 kg)	Jr	Baton Rouge, Louisiana
16	INF	Scott Hastings	L/R	6 ft 1 in (1.85 m)	205 lb (93 kg)	Sr	Double Oak, Texas
17	RHP	Mason Hopkins	R/R	6 ft 3 in (1.91 m)	170 lb (77 kg)	So	Sinton, Texas
18	INF	Leo Markotic	R/R	5 ft 11 in (1.8 m)	190 lb (86 kg)	So	Toronto, Canada
20	INF	Bryce Balusek	L/L	6 ft 3 in (1.91 m)	205 lb (93 kg)	Fr	Corpus Christi, Texas
21	C	Justin Taylor	R/R	6 ft 0 in (1.83 m)	190 lb (86 kg)	So	Dripping Springs, Texas
22	LHP	Jaime Ramirez Jr.	L/L	5 ft 10 in (1.78 m)	190 lb (86 kg)	Fr	San Antonio, Texas
23	INF	Nate White	R/R	6 ft 0 in (1.83 m)	190 lb (86 kg)	Fr	Arlington, Texas
24	OF	Mike Williams	L/R	6 ft 4 in (1.93 m)	190 lb (86 kg)	Sr	Rowlett, Texas
25	LHP	Nic Hernandez	L/L	5 ft 8 in (1.73 m)	155 lb (70 kg)	Fr	Bishop, Texas
26	RHP	Dylan Johnson	R/R	5 ft 10 in (1.78 m)	175 lb (79 kg)	Fr	San Antonio, Texas
27	LHP	Cassius Shy	L/L	6 ft 6 in (1.98 m)	200 lb (91 kg)	Jr	Las Vegas, Nevada
28	C	Tyler Byrd	R/R	6 ft 0 in (1.83 m)	210 lb (95 kg)	Fr	Atascocita, Texas
29	RHP	Colin Purcell	R/R	6 ft 4 in (1.93 m)	185 lb (84 kg)	Fr	Tomball, Texas
30	LHP	Nick Urbantke	L/L	6 ft 1 in (1.85 m)	220 lb (100 kg)	Sr	Lorena, Texas
31	RHP	Leo Perez	R/R	6 ft 1 in (1.85 m)	240 lb (109 kg)	Jr	Palmview, Texas
32	LHP	Justin Lewis	L/L	6 ft 0 in (1.83 m)	215 lb (98 kg)	So	Sachse, Texas
33	RHP	Daniel Nelson	R/R	6 ft 3 in (1.91 m)	195 lb (88 kg)	Jr	Crosby, Texas
34	RHP	Hayden Thomas	R/R	6 ft 1 in (1.85 m)	190 lb (86 kg)	So	Leander, Texas
35	RHP	Sebastian Mejia	R/R	5 ft 11 in (1.8 m)	186 lb (84 kg)	Fr	Humble, Texas
36	RHP	Tyler Miller	R/R	6 ft 7 in (2.01 m)	215 lb (98 kg)	So	Houston, Texas
38	INF	Wesley Mitchell	R/R	6 ft 3 in (1.91 m)	190 lb (86 kg)	Fr	Katy, Texas
39	OF	Brandon Petkoff	L/L	6 ft 1 in (1.85 m)	185 lb (84 kg)	Fr	Frankfort, Illinois
41	OF	Nick Mueller	L/L	6 ft 1 in (1.85 m)	175 lb (79 kg)	Fr	League City, Texas
43	RHP	JT Moeller	R/R	6 ft 1 in (1.85 m)	180 lb (82 kg)	Fr	San Antonio, Texas
44	OF	Trevor Davis	R/R	6 ft 5 in (1.96 m)	230 lb (104 kg)	So	Mesquite, Texas
45	RHP	Trace Blue	R/R	6 ft 3 in (1.91 m)	205 lb (93 kg)	Fr	Fulshear, Texas
46	INF	Tucker McEnroe	R/R	6 ft 1 in (1.85 m)	190 lb (86 kg)	Fr	Spring, Texas
47	OF	Caden Queck	R/R	6 ft 2 in (1.88 m)	200 lb (91 kg)	Fr	The Woodlands, Texas
48	OF	Carson Winkler	R/R	6 ft 0 in (1.83 m)	175 lb (79 kg)	Fr	Magnolia, Texas

Head coach

Scott Malone (McMurray)

Assistant coach(es)

Marty Smith (Hardin–Simmons)
Seth LaRue (Campbell)
Alan Sailors (Mary Hardin–Baylor)

Legend

- (C) Team captain
- (S) Suspended
- (I) Ineligible
- Injured
- Current redshirt

Roster
Last update: 2021 June 14

== Schedule and results ==
Legend
	Texas A&M–Corpus Christi win
	Texas A&M–Corpus Christi loss
	Postponement/Cancelation/Suspensions
**Bold**	Texas A&M–Corpus Christi team member

2021 Texas A&M–Corpus Christi Islanders baseball game log
Regular season (24-27)

February (4-3)
Date	Opponent	Rank	Site/stadium	Score	Win	Loss	Save	TV	Attendance	Overall record	SLC Record
Feb. 21	Central Michigan		Chapman Field • Corpus Christi, TX	**W** 4-3	**Moeller** (1-0)	Frazer (0-1)	None		176	1-0	
Feb. 21	Central Michigan		Chapman Field • Corpus Christi, TX	**W** 5-1	**Bird** (1-0)	Taylor (0-1)	None		258	2-0	
Feb. 22	Central Michigan		Chapman Field • Corpus Christi, TX	**W** 6-3	**Thomas** (1-0)	Rogoszewski (0-1)	**Shy** (1)		260	3-0	
Feb. 23	at Houston		Schroeder Park • Houston, TX	**L** 8-12	Miller (1-0)	**Urbantke** (0-1)	None		122	3-1	
Feb. 26	Houston		Whataburger Field • Corpus Christi, TX	**W** 3-2	**Perez** (1-0)	Gasser (1-1)	**Shy** (2)		714	4-1	
Feb. 27	Houston		Whataburger Field • Corpus Christi, TX	**L** 1-14	Sears (1-0)	**Bird** (1-1)	None		1,274	4-2	
Feb. 28	Houston		Whataburger Field • Corpus Christi, TX	**L** 3-4 (10 inns)	Cherry (1-0)	**Shy** (0-1)	None		716	4-3	

March (1-14)
Date	Opponent	Rank	Site/stadium	Score	Win	Loss	Save	TV	Attendance	Overall record	SLC Record
Mar. 2	at No. 19 Texas		UFCU Disch–Falk Field • Austin, TX	**L** 1-12	Kubichek (1-1)	**Ramirez** (0-1)	None		1,455	4-4	
Shriner's Hospital for Children College Classic
Mar. 5	vs. No. 13 TCU		Minute Maid Park • Houston, TX	**L** 5-15	Hill (1-0)	**Perez** (1-1)	None			4-5	
Mar. 6	vs. Rice		Minute Maid Park • Houston, TX	**L** 5-16	Garcia (1-0)	**Bird** (1-2)	None		1,000	4-6	
Mar. 7	vs. No. 10 Texas Tech		Minute Maid Park • Houston, TX	**L** 3-4	Queen (1-0)	**Thomas** (0-1)	Sublette (1)			4-7	
Mar. 9	at Texas A&M		Olsen Field at Blue Bell Park • College Station, TX	**L** 0-7	Dettmer (2-0)	**Shy** (0-2)	None	SECN+	1,146	4-8	
Mar. 12	at McNeese State		Joe Miller Ballpark • Lake Charles, LA	**L** 2-4	Kincaid (1-0)	**Gaddis** (0-1)	Dion (1)		236	4-9	0-1
Mar. 13	at McNeese State		Joe Miller Ballpark • Lake Charles, LA	**L** 8-9	Duplechain (2-1)	**Miller** (0-1)	None		312	4-10	0-2
Mar. 14	at McNeese State		Joe Miller Ballpark • Lake Charles, LA	**L** 7-12	Reeves (1-0)	**Purcell** (0-1)	None		298	4-11	0-3
Mar. 19	UTSA		Chapman Field • Corpus Christi, TX	**L** 5-11	Mason (2-2)	**Perez** (1-2)	None		315	4-12	
Mar. 20	UTSA		Chapman Field • Corpus Christi, TX	**L** 4-7	Garza (1-0)	**Gaddis** (0-2)	None		394	4-13	
Mar. 21	UTSA		Chapman Field • Corpus Christi, TX	**L** 1-10	Miller (1-0)	**Bird** (1-3)	None		287	4-14	
Mar. 26	at Sam Houston State		Don Sanders Stadium • Huntsville, TX	**L** 2-13 (7 inns)	Davis (3-1)	**Perez** (1-3)	None	ESPN+	412	4-15	0-4
Mar. 27	at Sam Houston State		Don Sanders Stadium • Huntsville, TX	**W** 12-6	**Ramirez** (1-1)	Dillard (0-3)	None		462	5-15	1-4
Mar. 27	at Sam Houston State		Don Sanders Stadium • Huntsville, TX	**L** 4-9	Robinson (1-1)	**Gaddis** (0-3)	Lusk (2)		462	5-16	1-5
Mar. 28	at Sam Houston State		Don Sanders Stadium • Huntsville, TX	**L** 6-7 (10 inns)	Atkinson (2-1)	**Miller** (0-2)	None		462	5-17	1-6

April (13-7)
Date	Opponent	Rank	Site/stadium	Score	Win	Loss	Save	TV	Attendance	Overall record	SLC Record
Apr. 1	New Orleans		Chapman Field • Corpus Christi, TX	**L** 4-5	Mitchell (1-0)	**Ramirez** (1-2)	Seroski (1)		212	5-18	1-7
Apr. 2	New Orleans		Chapman Field • Corpus Christi, TX	**L** 6-7 (8 inns)	Turpin (4-1)	**Johnson** (0-1)	None		189	5-19	1-8
Apr. 2	New Orleans		Chapman Field • Corpus Christi, TX	**W** 6-4	**Miller** (1-2)	Kulivan (0-1)	None		191	6-19	2-8
Apr. 3	New Orleans		Chapman Field • Corpus Christi, TX	**L** 4-6	Cerejo (1-1)	**Lopez** (0-1)	Seroski (2)		156	6-20	2-9
Apr. 6	at No. 4 Texas		UFCU Disch–Falk Field • Austin, TX	**L** 4-14	Wenzel (3-0)	**Johnson** (0-2)	None		1,596	6-21	
Apr. 9	at Nicholls		Ben Meyer Diamond at Ray E. Didier Field • Thibodaux, LA	**W** 7-3 (10 inns)	**Ramirez** (2-2)	Theriot (2-3)	None		673	7-21	3-9
Apr. 9	at Nicholls		Ben Meyer Diamond at Ray E. Didier Field • Thibodaux, LA	**W** 5-1	**Gaddis** (1-3)	Gearing (2-2)	None		627	8-21	4-9
Apr. 10	at Nicholls		Ben Meyer Diamond at Ray E. Didier Field • Thibodaux, LA	**L** 0-1	Desandro (2-1)	**Shy** (0-3)	Taylor (6)		793	8-22	4-10
Apr. 11	at Nicholls		Ben Meyer Diamond at Ray E. Didier Field • Thibodaux, LA	**W** 12-2	**Moeller** (2-0)	Heckman (1-4)	**Ramirez** (1)		787	9-22	5-10
South Texas Showdown Presented by: Navy/Army Community Credit Union
Apr. 13	Texas–Rio Grande Valley		Chapman Field • Corpus Christi, TX	Game cancelled							
Apr. 16	Central Arkansas		Chapman Field • Corpus Christi, TX	**W** 7-4 (12 inns)	**Ramirez** (3-2)	Cleveland (3-3)	None		239	10-22	6-10
Apr. 17	Central Arkansas		Chapman Field • Corpus Christi, TX	**W** 2-1	**Thomas** (2-1)	Moyer (2-4)	**Bird** (1)		197	11-22	7-10
Apr. 18	Central Arkansas		Chapman Field • Corpus Christi, TX	**W** 5-1	**Gaddis** (2-3)	Gilbertson (1-2)	None		167	12-22	8-10
Apr. 18	Central Arkansas		Chapman Field • Corpus Christi, TX	**W** 10-4	**Ramirez** (4-1)	Busey (0-2)	None		167	13-22	9-10
South Texas Showdown Presented by Navy/Army Community Credit Union
Apr. 20	at Texas–Rio Grande Valley		UTRGV Baseball Stadium • Edinburg, TX	**L** 4-14 (8 inns)	Tjelmeland (1-0)	**Nelson** (0-1)	None		1,175	13-23	
Apr. 23	Houston Baptist		Chapman Field • Corpus Christi, TX	**W** 13-6	**Ramirez** (5-2)	Coats (2-5)	None		286	14-23	10-10
Apr. 24	Houston Baptist		Chapman Field • Corpus Christi, TX	**W** 4-0	**Gaddis** (3-3)	Burch (2-2)	None		156	15-23	11-10
Apr. 24	Houston Baptist		Chapman Field • Corpus Christi, TX	**L** 2-3	Tinker (1-0)	**Thomas** (2-2)	Reitmeyer (4)		256	15-24	11-11
Apr. 25	Houston Baptist		Chapman Field • Corpus Christi, TX	**W** 9-8	**Moeller** (3-0)	Spinney (0-5)	None		268	16-24	12-11
Apr. 30	at Lamar		Vincent–Beck Stadium • Beaumont, TX	**W** 6-0	**Gaddis** (4-3)	Douthit (1-2)	None		565	17-24	13-11
Apr. 30	at Lamar		Vincent–Beck Stadium • Beaumont, TX	**W** 11-7	**Perez** (2-3)	Ekness (1-3)	None		565	18-24	14-11

May (6–3)
Date	Opponent	Rank	Site/stadium	Score	Win	Loss	Save	TV	Attendance	Overall record	SLC Record
May 1	at Lamar		Vincent–Beck Stadium • Beaumont, TX	**L** 3-7	Bravo (5-1)	**Shy** (0-4)	Dallas (9)		615	18-25	14-12
May 2	at Lamar		Vincent–Beck Stadium • Beaumont, TX	**L** 3-6	Michael (4-2)	**Thomas** (2-3)	Dallas (10)		520	18-26	14-13
May 7	Stephen F. Austin		Chapman Field • Corpus Christi, TX	**W** 5-1	**Ramirez** (6-2)	Sgambelluri (3-4)	None		246	19-26	15-13
May 8	Stephen F. Austin		Chapman Field • Corpus Christi, TX	**W** 10-2	**Gaddis** (5-3)	Todd (3-3)	None		230	20-26	16-13
May 8	Stephen F. Austin		Chapman Field • Corpus Christi, TX	**W** 5-2	**Thomas** (3-3)	Stobart (0-5)	None		236	21-26	17-13
May 9	Stephen F. Austin		Chapman Field • Corpus Christi, TX	**L** 3-5	Gennari (3-4)	**Miller** (1-3)	Rodriguez (1)		223	21-27	17-14
May 14	Southeastern Louisiana		Chapman Field • Corpus Christi, TX	**W** 4-3 (8 inns)	**Miller** (2-3)	Hoskins (2-1)	None		210	22-27	18-14
May 14	Southeastern Louisiana		Chapman Field • Corpus Christi, TX	**W** 2-1	**Ramirez** (7-2)	Stuprich (6-2)	None		210	23-27	19-14
May 15	Southeastern Louisiana		Chapman Field • Corpus Christi, TX	**W** 10-6	**Thomas** (4-3)	Kinzeler (4-4)	None		290	24-27	20-14
May 16	Southeastern Louisiana		Chapman Field • Corpus Christi, TX	Game cancelled							
May 21	at Northwestern State		H. Alvin Brown–C. C. Stroud Field • Natchitoches, LA	Game cancelled							
May 21	at Northwestern State		H. Alvin Brown–C. C. Stroud Field • Natchitoches, LA	Game cancelled							
May 22	at Northwestern State		H. Alvin Brown–C. C. Stroud Field • Natchitoches, LA	Game cancelled							
May 22	at Northwestern State		H. Alvin Brown–C. C. Stroud Field • Natchitoches, LA	Game cancelled							

Postseason (1–2)

SLC Tournament (1–2)
Date	Opponent	Seed/Rank	Site/stadium	Score	Win	Loss	Save	TV	Attendance	Overall record	Tournament record
May 26	vs. (5) Sam Houston State	(4)	Pat Kenelly Diamond at Alumni Field • Hammond, LA	**W** 4-3	**Miller** (3-3)	Davis (6-5)	None	ESPN+	812	25-27	1-0
May 27	vs. (1) Abilene Christian	(4)	Pat Kenelly Diamond at Alumni Field • Hammond, LA	**L** 3-4	Glaze (4-1)	**Perez** (2-4)	Riley (9)	ESPN+	976	25-28	1-1
May 28	vs. (5) Sam Houston State	(4)	Pat Kenelly Diamond at Alumni Field • Hammond, LA	**L** 2-14 (7 inns)	Atkinson (6-1)	**Shy** (0-5)	None	ESPN+	747	25-29	1-2

Schedule source:

*Rankings are based on the team's current ranking in the D1Baseball poll.

== Postseason ==
=== Conference accolades ===
- Player of the Year: Colton Cowser – SHSU
- Hitter of the Year: Colton Eager – ACU
- Pitcher of the Year: Will Dion – MCNS
- Relief Pitcher of the Year: Tyler Cleveland – UCA
- Freshman of the Year: Brennan Stuprich – SELA
- Newcomer of the Year: Grayson Tatrow – ACU
- Clay Gould Coach of the Year: Rick McCarty – ACU

All Conference First Team

- Chase Kemp (LAMR)
- Nate Fisbeck (MCNS)
- Itchy Burts (TAMUCC)
- Bash Randle (ACU)
- Mitchell Dickson (ACU)
- Lee Thomas (UIW)
- Colton Cowser (SHSU)
- Colton Eager (ACU)
- Clayton Rasbeary (MCNS)
- Will Dion (MCNS)
- Brennan Stuprich (SELA)
- Will Warren (SELA)
- Tyler Cleveland (UCA)
- Anthony Quirion (LAMR)

All Conference Second Team

- Preston Faulkner (SELA)
- Daunte Stuart (NSU)
- Kasten Furr (UNO)
- Evan Keller (SELA)
- Skylar Black (SFA)
- Tre Obregon III (MCNS)
- Jack Rogers (SHSU)
- Pearce Howard (UNO)
- Grayson Tatrow (ACU)
- Chris Turpin (UNO)
- John Gaddis (TAMUCC)
- Trevin Michael (LAMR)
- Caleb Seroski (UNO)
- Jacob Burke (SELA)

All Conference Third Team

- Luke Marbach (TAMUCC)
- Salo Iza (UNO)
- Austin Cain (NICH)
- Darren Willis (UNO)
- Ryan Snell (LAMR)
- Tommy Cruz (ACU)
- Tyler Finke (SELA)
- Payton Harden (MCNS)
- Mike Williams (TAMUCC)
- Cal Carver (NSU)
- Levi David (NSU)
- Dominic Robinson (SHSU)
- Jack Dallas (LAMR)
- Brett Hammit (ACU)

All Conference Defensive Team

- Luke Marbach (TAMUCC)
- Nate Fisebeck (MCNS)
- Anthony Quirion (LAMR)
- Darren Willis (UNO)
- Gaby Cruz (SELA)
- Julian Gonzales (MCNS)
- Colton Cowser (SHSU)
- Avery George (LAMR)
- Will Dion (MCNS)
