= 2021 Houston Baptist Huskies baseball team =

American college baseball season

2021 Houston Baptist Huskies baseball
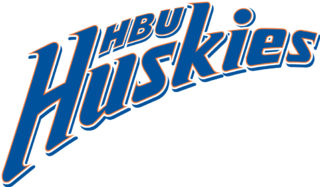
- Conference: Southland Conference
- Record: 14–38 (11–27 Southland)
- Head coach: Jared Moon (16th season)
- Assistant coaches: Xavier Hernandez; Russell Stockton
- Home stadium: Husky Field

2021 Southland Conference baseball standings
	Conf.				Overall
Team	W		L	PCT	W		L	PCT
Abilene Christian ‍†‍‍	25	–	13	.658	36	–	21	.632
Texas A&M–Corpus Christi ‍‍‍	20	–	14	.588	25	–	29	.463
New Orleans ‍‍‍	23	–	17	.575	29	–	28	.509
Sam Houston State ‍‍‍	20	–	15	.571	30	–	25	.545
Southeastern Louisiana ‍‍‍	22	–	17	.564	32	–	24	.571
Northwestern State ‍‍‍	20	–	16	.556	27	–	26	.509
McNeese State ‍‍‡‍^{y}	21	–	18	.538	32	–	30	.516
Lamar ‍‍‍	17	–	19	.472	25	–	23	.521
Central Arkansas ‍‍‍	18	–	22	.450	23	–	28	.451
Stephen F. Austin ‍‍‍	17	–	22	.436	20	–	31	.392
Incarnate Word ‍‍‍	17	–	23	.425	21	–	28	.429
Nicholls ‍‍‍	16	–	24	.400	21	–	34	.382
Houston Baptist ‍‍‍	11	–	27	.289	14	–	38	.269
† – Conference champion ‡ – Tournament champion y – Invited to the NCAA tournament As of June 6, 2021; Rankings from D1Baseball

The 2021 Houston Baptist Huskies baseball team represented Houston Baptist University during the 2021 NCAA Division I baseball season. The Huskies played their home games at Husky Field and were led by sixteenth–year head coach Jared Moon. They were members of the Southland Conference. On March 25, 2021, following the conclusion of the 2021 season, Jared Moon resigned from his head coaching duties after amassing an overall record of 401–441–2 in his sixteen seasons to take care of family matters.

== Preseason ==
=== Southland Conference Coaches Poll ===
The Southland Conference Coaches Poll was released on February 11, 2021, and the Huskies were picked to finish thirteenth and last in the conference with 49 votes.

Coaches poll
Predicted finish	Team	Votes (1st place)
1	Sam Houston State	276 (17)
2	Central Arkansas	247 (5)
3	McNeese State	244 (1)
4	Southeastern Louisiana	243 (3)
5	Northwestern State	193
6	Texas A&M–Corpus Christi	146
7	Incarnate Word	144
8	Nicholls	108
9	New Orleans	101
10	Abilene Christian	98
11	Stephen F. Austin	92
12	Lamar	87
13	Houston Baptist	49

=== Preseason All-Southland Team & Honors ===
==== First Team ====
- Ryan Flores (UIW, 1st Base)
- Nate Fisbeck (MCNS, 2nd Base)
- Beau Orlando (UCA, 3rd Base)
- JC Correa (LAMR, Shortstop)
- Gavin Johnson (SHSU, Catcher)
- Clayton Rasbeary (MCNS, Designated Hitter)
- Sean Arnold (UIW, Outfielder)
- Brandon Bena (HBU, Outfielder)
- Colton Cowser (SHSU, Outfielder)
- Noah Cameron (UCA, Pitcher)
- Will Dion (MCNS, Pitcher)
- Kyle Gruller (HBU, Pitcher)
- Conner Williams (UCA, Pitcher)
- Itchy Burts (TAMUCC, Utility)

==== Second Team ====
- Preston Faulkner (SELA, 1st Base)
- Logan Berlof (LAMR, 2nd Base)
- Anthony Quirion (LAMR, 3rd Base)
- Reid Bourque (MCNS, Shortstop)
- Chris Sandberg (NICH, Catcher)
- Lee Thomas (UIW, Designated Hitter)
- Josh Ragan (UCA, Outfielder)
- Jack Rogers (SHSU, Outfielder)
- Tyler Smith (NSU, Outfielder)
- John Gaddis (TAMUCC, Pitcher)
- Gavin Stone (UCA, Pitcher)
- Luke Taggart (UIW, Pitcher)
- Jeremy Rodriguez (SFA, Pitcher)
- Jake Dickerson (MCNS, Utility)

== Roster ==
2021 Houston Baptist Huskies baseball team
Players
Coaches

#	Pos.	Name	B/T	Height	Weight	Year	Home town
1	OF	Christian Dumont	R/R	5 ft 10 in (1.78 m)	175 lb (79 kg)	Jr	Bellevue, Nebraska
2	INF	Sebastian Trinidad	R/R	5 ft 11 in (1.8 m)	165 lb (75 kg)	Fr	Houston, Texas
3	C	Dawson Woods	L/R	6 ft 0 in (1.83 m)	200 lb (91 kg)	So	Corsicana, Texas
4	INF	Trent Franson	R/R	5 ft 9 in (1.75 m)	175 lb (79 kg)	Sr	Houston, Texas
5	C	Matt Solomon	R/R	5 ft 10 in (1.78 m)	195 lb (88 kg)	Sr	Katy, Texas
6	INF	Jake Miller	R/R	5 ft 10 in (1.78 m)	190 lb (86 kg)	Jr	Round Rock, Texas
8	RHP	Tyler Zarella	R/R	5 ft 10 in (1.78 m)	175 lb (79 kg)	So	League City, Texas
9	RHP	Kobe Calderone (redshirt)	R/R	6 ft 5 in (1.96 m)	220 lb (100 kg)	Fr	League City, Texas
10	OF	Chase Talbot	L/R	6 ft 0 in (1.83 m)	195 lb (88 kg)	Sr	Beaumont, Texas
11	RHP	Jacob Coats	R/R	6 ft 6 in (1.98 m)	235 lb (107 kg)	Sr	Schertz, Texas
12	INF	Sean Horgan (redshirt)	L/R	6 ft 0 in (1.83 m)	215 lb (98 kg)	Fr	Katy, Texas
13	INF	Braden Sanford	R/R	5 ft 9 in (1.75 m)	180 lb (82 kg)	So	Santee, California
14		Parker Wayne	R/R	5 ft 11 in (1.8 m)	185 lb (84 kg)	Jr	Missouri City, Texas
15	C	Brennan Bales	R/R	6 ft 0 in (1.83 m)	205 lb (93 kg)	So	Nebraska City, Nebraska
16	INF	Nathan Soriano	R/R	6 ft 2 in (1.88 m)	198 lb (90 kg)	Sr	Tucson, Arizona
17	RHP	Morris Austin	R/R	6 ft 2 in (1.88 m)	200 lb (91 kg)	So	Keller, Texas
18	RHP	Jordan Powell	R/R	5 ft 11 in (1.8 m)	185 lb (84 kg)	So	Montgomery, Texas
19	LHP	Austin Spinney	L/L	5 ft 10 in (1.78 m)	170 lb (77 kg)	Jr	Placentia, California
20	RHP	Jared Burch	R/R	6 ft 5 in (1.96 m)	210 lb (95 kg)	So	Houston, Texas
21	INF	Dylan Murphy	R/R	6 ft 2 in (1.88 m)	210 lb (95 kg)	Jr	Lufkin, Texas
23	OF	Lane Botkin	L/R	6 ft 0 in (1.83 m)	195 lb (88 kg)	Sr	Columbia, South Carolina
25	C	Daniel Budke	R/R	6 ft 0 in (1.83 m)	200 lb (91 kg)	Jr	Houston, Texas
26	OF	Brandon Bena	R/R	6 ft 2 in (1.88 m)	220 lb (100 kg)	Sr	Omaha, Nebraska
27	C	Ricky Rivera	R/R	5 ft 11 in (1.8 m)	240 lb (109 kg)	Jr	Fort Worth, Texas
29	OF	Curtis Warren (redshirt)	L/R	6 ft 1 in (1.85 m)	175 lb (79 kg)	Fr	Arlington, Texas
30	RHP	Cy Murphy	R/R	5 ft 11 in (1.8 m)	180 lb (82 kg)	Fr	Lufkin, Texas
32	INF	Knight Newcomb	R/R	6 ft 3 in (1.91 m)	210 lb (95 kg)	So	The Woodlands, Texas
34	C	Todd Jackson	R/R	6 ft 0 in (1.83 m)	185 lb (84 kg)	Jr	San Jose, California
35	RHP	Andrew Reitmeyer	R/R	6 ft 4 in (1.93 m)	220 lb (100 kg)	Jr	Oceanside, California
36	RHP	Javan Smitherman	R/R	5 ft 10 in (1.78 m)	175 lb (79 kg)	So	Kilgore, Texas
37	C	Brooks Harrison	R/R	5 ft 11 in (1.8 m)	190 lb (86 kg)	Fr	Houston, Texas
38	RHP	Blake Bolgiano	R/R	6 ft 1 in (1.85 m)	190 lb (86 kg)	So	Midlothian, Texas
39	LHP	Brent Pronger	L/L	6 ft 6 in (1.98 m)	185 lb (84 kg)	Sr	Burleson, Texas
40	INF	Matt Crossley	R/R	6 ft 2 in (1.88 m)	240 lb (109 kg)	So	Round Rock, Texas
41	RHP	Daxton Tinker	R/R	6 ft 3 in (1.91 m)	225 lb (102 kg)	So	Sulphur, Louisiana
44	RHP	Ethan Abbott	R/R	6 ft 5 in (1.96 m)	210 lb (95 kg)	RS Fr	Houston, Texas
	RHP	Chris Burns	R/R	6 ft 2 in (1.88 m)	195 lb (88 kg)	So	Houston, Texas
	RHP	Jaron Roblyer	R/R	6 ft 6 in (1.98 m)	245 lb (111 kg)	Jr	Pearland, Texas

Head coach

Jared Moon (Houston Baptist)

Assistant coach(es)

Xavier Hernandez (Houston Baptist)
Russell Stockton (Houston)
Jason LaRocque (Ottawa)

Legend

- (C) Team captain
- (S) Suspended
- (I) Ineligible
- Injured
- Current redshirt

Roster
Last update: 2021 June 13

== Schedule and results ==
Legend
	Houston Baptist win
	Houston Baptist loss
	Postponement/Cancelation/Suspensions
**Bold**	Houston Baptist team member

2021 Houston Baptist Huskies baseball game log
Regular season (14–38)

February (1–5)
Date	Opponent	Rank	Site/stadium	Score	Win	Loss	Save	TV	Attendance	Overall record	SLC Record
Feb. 20	at Rice		Reckling Park • Houston, TX	**W** 8-7	**Reitmeyer** (1–0)	Greenwood (0–1)	None		994	1-0	
Feb. 21	at Rice		Reckling Park • Houston, TX	**L** 3-9	Zaskoda (1–0)	**Bolgiano** (0–1)	None		946	1-1	
Feb. 22	at Rice		Reckling Park • Houston, TX	**L** 0-1	Gallant (1–0)	**Tinker** (0–1)	None		835	1-2	
Feb. 26	at No. 10 Texas Tech		Dan Law Field at Rip Griffin Park • Lubbock, TX	**L** 3-18 (7 inn.)	Birdsell (1–0)	**Zarella** (0–1)	None		2,270	1-3	
Feb. 27	at No. 10 Texas Tech		Dan Law Field at Rip Griffin Park • Lubbock, TX	**L** 1-8	Monteverde (1–0)	**Coats** (0–1)	None		2,270	1-4	
Feb. 28	at No. 10 Texas Tech		Dan Law Field at Rip Griffin Park • Lubbock, TX	**L** 2-11	Montgomery (1–0)	**Spinney** (0–1)	None		2,270	1-5	

March (4–14)
Date	Opponent	Rank	Site/stadium	Score	Win	Loss	Save	TV	Attendance	Overall record	SLC Record
Mar. 2	at Texas A&M		Olsen Field at Blue Bell Park • College Station, TX	**L** 0-4	Dettmer (1–0)	**Tinker** (0–2)	Jozwiak (1)		1,151	1-6	
Mar. 6	at Louisiana		M. L. Tigue Moore Field at Russo Park • Lafayette, LA	**L** 2-5	Durke (2–0)	**Zarella** (0–2)	Talley (3)	ESPN+	737	1-7	
Mar. 6	at Louisiana		M. L. Tigue Moore Field at Russo Park • Lafayette, LA	**L** 1-4	Arrighetti (2–0)	**Coats** (0–2)	Schultz (2)	ESPN+	610	1-8	
Mar. 7	at Louisiana		M. L. Tigue Moore Field at Russo Park • Lafayette, LA	**W** 6-4	**Reitmeyer** (1-1)	Angel (0–1)	**Burch** (1)	ESPN+	735	2-8	
Mar. 9	at Rice		Reckling Park • Houston, TX	**L** 1-3	Deskins (1-1)	**Murphy** (0–1)	Garibay (1)		929	2-9	
Mar. 12	at New Orleans		Maestri Field at Privateer Park • New Orleans	**L** 0-3	Turpin (3–0)	**Zarella** (0–2)	None		262	2-10	0–1
Mar. 13	at New Orleans		Maestri Field at Privateer Park • New Orleans, LA	**L** 10-11	Barthelemy (1-1)	**Reitmeyer** (2–1)	None		413	2-11	0–2
Mar. 13	at New Orleans		Maestri Field at Privateer Park • New Orleans, LA	**L** 2-8	Khachadourian (2–0)	**Spinney** (0–2)	None		413	2-12	0–3
Mar. 14	at New Orleans		Maestri Field at Privateer Park • New Orleans, LA	**L** 2-9	Seroski (2–1)	**Tinker** (0–1)	None		396	2-13	0–4
Mar. 19	McNeese State		Husky Field • Houston, TX	**L** 6-12	Duplechain (3–1)	**Zarella** (0–3)	None		200	2-14	0–5
Mar. 20	McNeese State		Husky Field • Houston, TX	**L** 1-7	Dion (2-2)	**Coats** (0–3)	None		400	2-15	0–6
Mar. 20	McNeese State		Husky Field • Houston, TX	**W** 7-3	**Austin** (1–0)	Foster (0–1)	**Reitmeyer** (1)		400	3-15	1–6
Mar. 21	McNeese State		Husky Field • Houston, TX	**L** 0-10	Ellison (1–0)	**Tinker** (0–4)	None		200	3-16	1–7
Mar. 26	at Nicholls		Ben Meyer Diamond at Ray E. Didier Field • Thibodaux, LA	**W** 5-4	**Austin** (2–0)	Taylor (0–3)	None		545	4-16	2–7
Mar. 27	at Nicholls		Ben Meyer Diamond at Ray E. Didier Field • Thibodaux, LA	**L** 1-2	Kilcrease (1–2)	**Coats** (0–4)	Theriot (1)		671	4-17	2–8
Mar. 27	at Nicholls		Ben Meyer Diamond at Ray E. Didier Field • Thibodaux, LA	**L** 4-5	Saltaformaggio (2–0)	**Smitherman** (0–1)	None		701	4-18	2–9
Mar. 28	at Nicholls		Ben Meyer Diamond at Ray E. Didier Field • Thibodaux, LA	**W** 6-2	**Burch** (1–0)	Heckman (1–2)	None		573	5-18	3–9

April (5–11)
Date	Opponent	Rank	Site/stadium	Score	Win	Loss	Save	TV	Attendance	Overall record	SLC Record
Apr. 1	Lamar		Husky Field • Houston, TX	**L** 3-13	Michael (2–1)	**Spinney** (0–3)	None		200	5-19	3–10
Apr. 2	Lamar		Husky Field • Houston, TX	**W** 3-2	**Coats** (1–4)	Olivarez (0–1)	**Reitmeyer** (2)		400	6-19	4–10
Apr. 2	Lamar		Husky Field • Houston, TX	**L** 4-15	Grigbsy (2–0)	**Zarella** (0–4)	None		400	6-20	4–11
Apr. 3	Lamar		Husky Field • Houston, TX	**L** 0-12	Palmer (3–0)	**Smitherman** (0–2)	None		265	6-21	4–12
Apr. 9	at Oral Roberts		J. L. Johnson Stadium • Tulsa, OK	**L** 1-6	Rogen (2-2)	**Spinney** (0–4)	Scoggins (3)		584	6-22	
Apr. 10	at Oral Roberts		J. L. Johnson Stadium • Tulsa, OK	**L** 1-3	Coffey (4–1)	**Coats** (1–5)	None		668	6-23	
Apr. 11	at Oral Roberts		J. L. Johnson Stadium • Tulsa, OK	**W** 2-0	**Burch** (2–0)	Gaskins (1–2)	None		673	7-23	
Apr. 16	Northwestern State		Husky Field • Houston, TX	**W** 7-6	**Austin** (3–0)	Brown (1–2)	None		200	8-23	5–12
Apr. 17	Northwestern State		Husky Field • Houston, TX	**L** 2-3	Carver (4–3)	**Burch** (2–1)	None		400	8-24	5–13
Apr. 17	Northwestern State		Husky Field • Houston, TX	**W** 6-2	**Coats** (2–4)	David (2–4)	**Reitmeyer** (3)		400	9-24	6–13
Apr. 18	Northwestern State		Husky Field • Houston, TX	**L** 5-6	Banes (2–1)	**Austin** (3–1)	None		200	9-25	6–14
Apr. 23	at Texas A&M–Corpus Christi		Chapman Field • Corpus Christi, TX	**L** 6-13	Ramirez (5–2)	**Coats** (2–5)	None		286	9-26	6–15
Apr. 24	at Texas A&M–Corpus Christi		Chapman Field • Corpus Christi, TX	**L** 0-4	Gaddis (3-3)	**Burch** (2-2)	None		156	9-27	6–16
Apr. 24	at Texas A&M–Corpus Christi		Chapman Field • Corpus Christi, TX	**W** 3-2	**Tinker** (1–0)	Thomas (2-2)	**Reitmeyer** (4)		256	10-27	7–16
Apr. 25	at Texas A&M–Corpus Christi		Chapman Field • Corpus Christi, TX	**L** 8-9	Moeller (3–0)	**Spinney** (0–5)	None		268	10-28	7–17
Apr. 30	Abilene Christian		Husky Field • Houston, TX	**L** 2-5	Stephenson (1–4)	**Burch** (2–3)	Riley (5)		200	10-29	7–18

May (4–9)
Date	Opponent	Rank	Site/stadium	Score	Win	Loss	Save	TV	Attendance	Overall record	SLC Record
May 1	Abilene Christian		Husky Field • Houston, TX	Game cancelled							
May 1	Abilene Christian		Husky Field • Houston, TX	Game cancelled							
May 2	Abilene Christian		Husky Field • Houston, TX	**L** 6-8	Chirpich (5–3)	**Reitmeyer** (2-2)	Riley (6)		200	10-30	7–19
May 7	at Incarnate Word		Sullivan Field • San Antonio, TX	**L** 4-9	Celestino (1-1)	**Austin** (3–2)	None		50	10-31	7-20
May 7	at Incarnate Word		Sullivan Field • San Antonio, TX	**L** 4-5	Cassidy (2-2)	**Coats** (2–7)	Garza (4)		94	10-32	7-21
May 8	at Incarnate Word		Sullivan Field • San Antonio, TX	**L** 4-5	McElmeel (3–0)	**Reitmeyer** (2–3)	Foral (1)		115	10-33	7-22
May 9	at Incarnate Word		Sullivan Field • San Antonio, TX	**L** 2-3	Hayward (2–3)	**Zarella** (0–6)	Garza (6)		92	10-34	7-23
May 14	Central Arkansas		Husky Field • Houston, TX	**W** 7-1	**Coats** (3–6)	Navarro (1-1)	None		400	11-34	8-23
May 14	Central Arkansas		Husky Field • Houston, TX	**L** 6-8	Moyer (4–6)	**Zarella** (0–6)	Cleveland (9)		400	11-35	8-24
May 15	Central Arkansas		Husky Field • Houston, TX	**L** 2-3	Cleveland (6–3)	**Reitmeyer** (2–4)	None		400	11-36	8-25
May 15	Central Arkansas		Husky Field • Houston, TX	**W** 8-6	**Smitherman** (1–2)	Janak (2–4)	None		400	12-36	9-25
May 20	at Southeastern Louisiana		Pat Kenelly Diamond at Alumni Field • Hammond, LA	**L** 0-10 (8 inns)	Warren (7–2)	**Coats** (3–8)	None		825	12-37	9-26
May 21	at Southeastern Louisiana		Pat Kenelly Diamond at Alumni Field • Hammond, LA	**W** 3-1	**Tinker** (2–4)	Hoskins (2-2)	None		848	13-37	10–26
May 21	at Southeastern Louisiana		Pat Kenelly Diamond at Alumni Field • Hammond, LA	**W** 4-3	**Reitmeyer** (3–4)	Harrington (1–2)	None		879	14-37	11–26
May 22	at Southeastern Louisiana		Pat Kenelly Diamond at Alumni Field • Hammond, LA	**L** 2-8	Bartley (4–1)	**Zarella** (0–7)	None		915	14-38	11–27

Schedule source:

*Rankings are based on the team's current ranking in the D1Baseball poll.
