= Tim Donnelly (baseball) =

American college baseball coach

Current position
- Title: Associate head coach
- Team: Marshall
- Conference: Sun Belt

Biographical details
- Born: September 8, 1980 (age 46); Arlington, Texas, U.S.

Playing career
- 2000–2001: Northeast Texas CC
- 2002–2004: Hardin–Simmons

Coaching career (HC unless noted)
- 2005: Malone (Asst)
- 2006: Kent State (H/IF)
- 2007–2016: Marshall (H/IF)
- 2017–2018: Middle Tennessee (H/IF)
- 2019–2021: Southeastern Louisiana (AHC/RC)
- 2022: Western Kentucky (H)
- 2023: Akron (Interim HC)
- 2024–present: Marshall (Associate HC)

Head coaching record
- Overall: 21–34 (.382)
- Tournaments: 0–0

Tim Donnelly (born September 8, 1980) is an American baseball coach who is the associate head baseball coach at Marshall. He previously served interim head baseball coach of the Akron Zips during the 2023 season. He played college baseball at Northeast Texas Community College before transferring to Hardin–Simmons.

== Coaching career ==
On January 4, 2023, Donnelly was promoted from assistant coach to the interim head coach of the Akron Zips. After the season, Donnelly was hired as the associate head coach under Greg Beals at Marshall.

== Head coaching record ==
Record table
Season	Team	Overall	Conference	Standing	Postseason
Akron Zips (Mid-American Conference) (2023–present)
2023	Akron	21–34	12–18	T–9th	
Akron:		21–34	12–18		
Total:		21–34			
National champion Postseason invitational champion Conference regular season champion Conference regular season and conference tournament champion Division regular season champion Division regular season and conference tournament champion Conference tournament champion
