= List of Sam Houston State University alumni =

Since graduating its first class, Sam Houston State University has had many of its former students go on to garner recognition and accolades.

== Science and academics ==
- Hiram Abiff Boaz – bishop; president of Polytechnic College 1902–1911, and of Southern Methodist University, 1920–1922
- Willie Dee Bowles – historian of women's suffrage
- William "Bill" R. Brinkley – Professor and Dean of the Graduate School of Biomedical Sciences at Baylor College of Medicine
- Melinda Estes – neuropathologist and president and chief executive of the Fletcher Allen Health Care corporation

== Arts and media ==
- David Adickes – painter; sculptor; creator of '65 Sam Houston statue, President heads at Presidents Park
- Jonathan Aibel – screenwriter of Kung Fu Panda and Kung Fu Panda 2
- Dana Andrews – Hollywood actor and president of the Screen Actors Guild, 1963–1965
- Frank Bielec – Trading Spaces designer
- Katie Rose Clarke – Broadway actor
- Roger Creager – country-western musician
- Brooke Daniels – Miss Texas USA 2009
- Frank Q. Dobbs – writer, director, producer (Streets of Laredo, Gunsmoke)
- Dan Dunn – cartoonist, creator of Paintjam
- Lauren Galley – author, spokesperson
- Randy Galloway – writer, Fort Worth Star-Telegram; radio personality ESPN 103.3
- Greg Graham – Broadway choreographer
- James Havard – painter and sculptor
- Roy Hazelwood – FBI profiler and author
- Richard Linklater – Oscar-nominated film director
- Steven Long – true crime writer
- Debra Maffett – Miss America, 1983; now host of The Harvest Show on LeSea Broadcasting Network (RTF major)
- Joel McDonald – voice actor
- Emily Neves – voice actor
- Dan Rather – newscaster (1953, B.A. Journalism)
- James Surls – modernist artist
- Jack Tinsley – Fort Worth Star-Telegram executive editor who led the paper to two Pulitzer Prizes in the 1980s

== Athletics ==
- Walt Anderson – NFL referee (1974) and head referee for Super Bowl XLV
- Michael Bankston – professional football player, defensive tackle; 3rd round draft choice in 1991 by the Arizona Cardinals; played ten years in the NFL for AZ, Wash., Cin.
- Stan Blinka – linebacker for the NFL's New York Jets
- Rhett Bomar – quarterback for the NFL's Minnesota Vikings
- Ronnie Carroll – offensive guard for the NFL's Houston Oilers
- Tina Chandler – IFBB professional bodybuilder
- Keith Davis – former safety for the NFL's Dallas Cowboys
- Johnnie Dirden – wide receiver for the NFL's Houston Oilers
- Matt Dominguez – wide receiver for the CFL's Saskatchewan Roughriders
- Keith Heinrich – tight end for the NFL's Tampa Bay Buccaneers
- Phil Hennigan – former Major League Baseball pitcher, Cleveland Indians and New York Mets
- Ben Hightower – tight end for the AFL's Cleveland Rams
- Hubbard Law – offensive guard for the NFL's Pittsburgh Steelers
- Josh McCown – backup quarterback for the NFL's Cleveland Browns
- Guido Merkens – quarterback, wide receiver, running back, and defensive back for multiple teams
- McNeil Moore – defensive back for the NFL's Chicago Bears
- Sam Moore – gridiron football player
- Monty Sopp, born Billy Gunn – professional wrestler
- Steve Sparks – professional baseball player (1987)
- D.D. Terry – running back for the NFL's Jacksonville Jaguars
- Hayden Wesneski – MLB pitcher
- George Wright – defensive tackle for the NFL's Baltimore Colts

== Politics ==
- Joseph A. Adame – mayor of Corpus Christi
- Kenneth Armbrister – former Texas state senator and director of legislative affairs
- Robert Gammage – former US congressman; former Texas Supreme Court justice
- Lyda Green – retired educator; Republican politician in Alaska
- John H. Hannah, Jr. – former United States federal judge
- Gibson D. Lewis – former Texas speaker of the House, the longest serving in state history
- Borris L. Miles – member of the Texas House of Representatives from District 146
- Thaksin Shinawatra – former prime minister of Thailand (1979, PhD in Criminal Justice)
- Charlie Wilson – member of the United States House of Representatives from Texas's 2nd congressional district
- Ralph Yarborough – Texas Democratic politician who served in the United States Senate (1957–1971)
- Bill Zedler – member of the Texas House of Representatives from Tarrant County, 2003–2009 and since 2011 ('67 M.B.A.)

== Armed services ==
- William F. Garrison – retired major general of the United States Army; commander of Operation Gothic Serpent, the military operation launched in 1993 to capture Somali warlord Mohamed Farrah Aidid
- Hiram "Doc" Jones – deputy chief of chaplains of the United States Air Force
- Marcus Luttrell – Navy Cross recipient for his actions in 2005 facing Taliban fighters during Operation Red Wing; co-authored the New York Times bestseller Lone Survivor: The Eyewitness Account of Operation Redwing and the Lost Heroes of SEAL Team 10
- J. Michael Myatt – retired major general of the United States Marine Corps; commanded the 1st Marine Division during Operation Desert Storm in 1990–91; his division liberated Kuwait City; president and CEO of the Marines Memorial Association
- Larry Snook – former United States Army colonel; former Grimes County judge
