= 2021 Sam Houston State Bearkats baseball team =

American college baseball season

2021 Sam Houston State Bearkats baseball
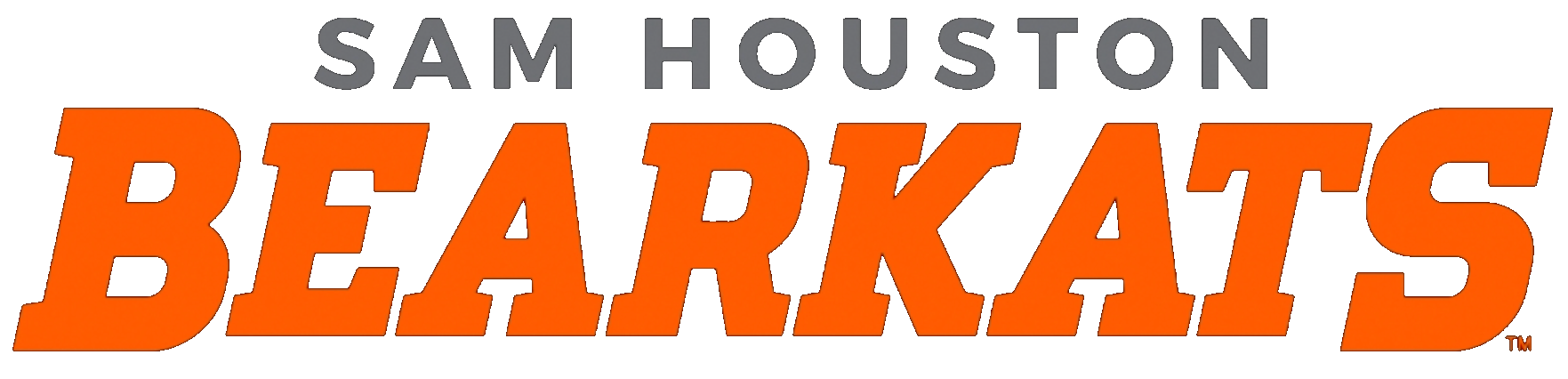
- Conference: Southland Conference
- Record: 30–25 (20–15 Southland)
- Head coach: Jay Sirianni (2nd season)
- Assistant coaches: Fuller Smith; Shane Wedd
- Home stadium: Don Sanders Stadium

2021 Southland Conference baseball standings
	Conf.				Overall
Team	W		L	PCT	W		L	PCT
Abilene Christian ‍†‍‍	25	–	13	.658	36	–	21	.632
Texas A&M–Corpus Christi ‍‍‍	20	–	14	.588	25	–	29	.463
New Orleans ‍‍‍	23	–	17	.575	29	–	28	.509
Sam Houston State ‍‍‍	20	–	15	.571	30	–	25	.545
Southeastern Louisiana ‍‍‍	22	–	17	.564	32	–	24	.571
Northwestern State ‍‍‍	20	–	16	.556	27	–	26	.509
McNeese State ‍‍‡‍^{y}	21	–	18	.538	32	–	30	.516
Lamar ‍‍‍	17	–	19	.472	25	–	23	.521
Central Arkansas ‍‍‍	18	–	22	.450	23	–	28	.451
Stephen F. Austin ‍‍‍	17	–	22	.436	20	–	31	.392
Incarnate Word ‍‍‍	17	–	23	.425	21	–	28	.429
Nicholls ‍‍‍	16	–	24	.400	21	–	34	.382
Houston Baptist ‍‍‍	11	–	27	.289	14	–	38	.269
† – Conference champion ‡ – Tournament champion y – Invited to the NCAA tournament As of June 6, 2021; Rankings from D1Baseball

The 2021 Sam Houston State Bearkats baseball team represented Sam Houston State University during the 2021 NCAA Division I baseball season. The Bearkats played their home games at Don Sanders Stadium and were led by second–year head coach Jay Sirianni. They were members of the Southland Conference. This was Sam Houston State's final year in the Southland as they will be moving to the Western Athletic Conference for the 2022 season.

== Preseason ==
=== Southland Conference Coaches Poll ===
The Southland Conference Coaches Poll was released on February 11, 2021 and the Bearkats were picked to finish first in the conference with 276 votes and 17 first place votes.

Coaches poll
Predicted finish	Team	Votes (1st place)
1	Sam Houston State	276 (17)
2	Central Arkansas	247 (5)
3	McNeese State	244 (1)
4	Southeastern Louisiana	243 (3)
5	Northwestern State	193
6	Texas A&M–Corpus Christi	146
7	Incarnate Word	144
8	Nicholls	108
9	New Orleans	101
10	Abilene Christian	98
11	Stephen F. Austin	92
12	Lamar	87
13	Houston Baptist	49

=== Preseason All-Southland Team & Honors ===
==== First Team ====
- Ryan Flores (UIW, 1st Base)
- Nate Fisbeck (MCNS, 2nd Base)
- Beau Orlando (UCA, 3rd Base)
- JC Correa (LAMR, Shortstop)
- Gavin Johnson (SHSU, Catcher)
- Clayton Rasbeary (MCNS, Designated Hitter)
- Sean Arnold (UIW, Outfielder)
- Brandon Bena (HBU, Outfielder)
- Colton Cowser (SHSU, Outfielder)
- Noah Cameron (UCA, Pitcher)
- Will Dion (MCNS, Pitcher)
- Kyle Gruller (HBU, Pitcher)
- Conner Williams (UCA, Pitcher)
- Itchy Burts (TAMUCC, Utility)

==== Second Team ====
- Preston Faulkner (SELA, 1st Base)
- Logan Berlof (LAMR, 2nd Base)
- Anthony Quirion (LAMR, 3rd Base)
- Reid Bourque (MCNS, Shortstop)
- Chris Sandberg (NICH, Catcher)
- Lee Thomas (UIW, Designated Hitter)
- Josh Ragan (UCA, Outfielder)
- Jack Rogers (SHSU, Outfielder)
- Tyler Smith (NSU, Outfielder)
- John Gaddis (TAMUCC, Pitcher)
- Gavin Stone (UCA, Pitcher)
- Luke Taggart (UIW, Pitcher)
- Jeremy Rodriguez (SFA, Pitcher)
- Jake Dickerson (MCNS, Utility)

== Roster ==
2021 Sam Houston State Bearkats baseball team
Players
Coaches

#	Pos.	Name	B/T	Height	Weight	Year	Home town
1	INF	Erick Davila	L/R	5 ft 9 in (1.75 m)	175 lb (79 kg)	So	Bayamon, Puerto Rico
2	INF	Anthony Mackenzie	S/R	6 ft 0 in (1.83 m)	195 lb (88 kg)	Fr	Houston, Texas
3	OF	Blake Faecher	R/R	6 ft 0 in (1.83 m)	205 lb (93 kg)	Jr	Cypress, Texas
4		Brandon Pruitt	R/R	5 ft 10 in (1.78 m)	165 lb (75 kg)	RS So	Richmond, Texas
5	OF	Eric Bohnert	R/R	5 ft 11 in (1.8 m)	185 lb (84 kg)	Jr	Cypress, Texas
6	INF	Easton Loyd	L/R	5 ft 9 in (1.75 m)	160 lb (73 kg)	Fr	Marshall, Texas
7	INF	Jackson Loftin	R/R	6 ft 1 in (1.85 m)	195 lb (88 kg)	So	Spring, Texas
8	OF	Christian Smith	R/R	5 ft 10 in (1.78 m)	185 lb (84 kg)	Jr	El Paso, Texas
9	INF	Bryce Holmes	L/R	6 ft 0 in (1.83 m)	195 lb (88 kg)	Jr	Dallardsville, Texas
10	C	Wes Folse	R/R	6 ft 1 in (1.85 m)	190 lb (86 kg)	Fr	Sweeny, Texas
11	INF	Mason Schultz	L/R	5 ft 10 in (1.78 m)	180 lb (82 kg)	Fr	League City, Texas
12	INF	Clayton Chadwick	L/R	5 ft 9 in (1.75 m)	195 lb (88 kg)	Fr	La Vernia, Texas
13	OF	JT Mounce	L/L	5 ft 11 in (1.8 m)	160 lb (73 kg)	Fr	Cypress, Texas
14	INF	Luke Repka	L/R	5 ft 11 in (1.8 m)	200 lb (91 kg)	So	The Woodlands, Texas
15	RHP	Lance Lusk	R/R	6 ft 1 in (1.85 m)	180 lb (82 kg)	Jr	Spring, Texas
16		Clay Stevens	R/R	5 ft 10 in (1.78 m)	185 lb (84 kg)	So	Muenster, Texas
17	OF	Colton Cowser	L/R	6 ft 3 in (1.91 m)	195 lb (88 kg)	So	Cypress, Texas
18	RHP	Tyler Davis	R/R	6 ft 3 in (1.91 m)	210 lb (95 kg)	Jr	Spring, Texas
19	LHP	Kyle Backhus	L/L	6 ft 4 in (1.93 m)	185 lb (84 kg)	Sr	New Waverly, Texas
20	LHP	Bryson Lucas	L/L	6 ft 1 in (1.85 m)	180 lb (82 kg)	Fr	College Station, Texas
21	RHP	Hayden Collins	R/R	6 ft 0 in (1.83 m)	175 lb (79 kg)	So	Cypress, Texas
22	LHP	Dakota Palmer	L/L	5 ft 11 in (1.8 m)	215 lb (98 kg)	Fr	Guy, Texas
23	RHP	Garrett Egli	R/R	6 ft 4 in (1.93 m)	205 lb (93 kg)	Jr	San Antonio, Texas
25	C	Trent Touchet	R/R	6 ft 1 in (1.85 m)	200 lb (91 kg)	RS Jr	Shreveport, Louisiana
26	LHP	Steven Beard	L/L	6 ft 0 in (1.83 m)	190 lb (86 kg)	So	The Woodlands, Texas
27	INF	Corbin Vines	R/R	6 ft 3 in (1.91 m)	200 lb (91 kg)	Jr	Hempstead, Texas
29	LHP	Tanner Sembera	L/L	6 ft 1 in (1.85 m)	170 lb (77 kg)	Jr	Weimar, Texas
30	LHP	Dominic Robinson	L/L	6 ft 1 in (1.85 m)	195 lb (88 kg)	Sr	Tomball, Texas
32	RHP	Ryan Peters	R/R	6 ft 2 in (1.88 m)	165 lb (75 kg)	Fr	Cypress, Texas
33	RHP	Landon Ausley	R/R	6 ft 6 in (1.98 m)	210 lb (95 kg)	Jr	Austin, Texas
34	RHP	Caleb Cannon	R/R	6 ft 4 in (1.93 m)	215 lb (98 kg)	Fr	Humble, Texas
35	RHP	Jack Driskell	R/R	6 ft 1 in (1.85 m)	185 lb (84 kg)	So	Round Rock, Texas
36	RHP	Coltin Atkinson	R/R	6 ft 1 in (1.85 m)	195 lb (88 kg)	Fr	Porter, Texas
37	LHP	Matt Dillard	L/L	6 ft 2 in (1.88 m)	200 lb (91 kg)	So	Houston, Texas
41	RHP	Cole Wesneski	R/R	6 ft 2 in (1.88 m)	215 lb (98 kg)	Jr	Cypress, Texas
42	RHP	Matt Rudis	R/R	6 ft 3 in (1.91 m)	195 lb (88 kg)	So	Madisonville, Texas
43	C	Gavin Johnson	L/R	6 ft 0 in (1.83 m)	195 lb (88 kg)	RS Sr	San Antonio, Texas
44	INF	Jack Rogers	L/L	6 ft 2 in (1.88 m)	185 lb (84 kg)	Jr	Spring, Texas
45	RHP	Hunter Murray (redshirt)	R/R	6 ft 1 in (1.85 m)	190 lb (86 kg)	So	Lovelady, Texas
47	RHP	Logan Hewitt	R/R	5 ft 11 in (1.8 m)	165 lb (75 kg)	Fr	Aledo, Texas
48	RHP	Alex Havlicek	R/R	6 ft 5 in (1.96 m)	220 lb (100 kg)	So	Oakland, New Jersey

Head coach

Jay Sirianni (Nebraska–Lincoln)

Assistant coach(es)

Fuller Smith (Mississippi)
Shane Wedd (Kansas)
Lance Miles (Sam Houston State)

Legend

- (C) Team captain
- (S) Suspended
- (I) Ineligible
- Injured
- Current redshirt

Roster
Last update: 2021 June 16

== Schedule and results ==
Legend
	Sam Houston State win
	Sam Houston State loss
	Postponement/Cancelation/Suspensions
**Bold**	Sam Houston State team member

2021 Sam Houston State Bearkats baseball game log
Regular season (26-23)

February (1-3)
Date	Opponent	Rank	Site/stadium	Score	Win	Loss	Save	TV	Attendance	Overall record	SLC Record
Feb. 19	No. 20 Oklahoma State		Don Sanders Stadium • Huntsville, TX	Game cancelled							
Feb. 20	No. 20 Oklahoma State		Don Sanders Stadium • Huntsville, TX	Game cancelled							
Feb. 21	No. 20 Oklahoma State		Don Sanders Stadium • Huntsville, TX	Game cancelled							
Feb. 24	vs. Texas State		Globe Life Field • Arlington, TX	**L** 4-5	Gould (1-0)	**Beard** (0-1)	Sundgren (1)	FloBaseball	225	0-1	
Feb. 26	UTSA		Don Sanders Stadium • Huntsville, TX	**W** 4-2	**Davis** (1-0)	Malone (0-1)	**Havlicek** (1)	ESPN+	387	1-1	
Feb. 27	UTSA		Don Sanders Stadium • Huntsville, TX	**L** 4-10	Daughety (1-0)	**Dillard** (0-1)	None		387	1-2	
Feb. 28	UTSA		Don Sanders Stadium • Huntsville, TX	**L** 5-18	Mason (1-0)	**Atkinson** (0-1)	None		387	1-3	

March (7-10)
Date	Opponent	Rank	Site/stadium	Score	Win	Loss	Save	TV	Attendance	Overall record	SLC Record
Mar. 2	at Baylor		Baylor Ballpark • Waco, TX	**L** 0-4	Hambleton (2-0)	**Rudis** (0-1)	None	ESPN+	1,036	1-4	
Shriners Hospital for Children College Classic
Mar. 5	vs. Rice		Minute Maid Park • Houston, TX	**W** 12-4	**Davis** (2-0)	Brogdon (0-2)	None	AT&T SportsNet		2-4	
Mar. 6	vs. No. 10 Texas Tech		Minute Maid Park • Houston, TX	**L** 0-8	Monteverde (2-0)	**Dillard** (0-2)	None	AT&T SportsNet		2-5	
Mar. 7	vs. No. 13 TCU		Minute Maid Park • Houston, TX	**W** 6-5	**Havelicek** (1-0)	Wright (0-1)	None	AT&T SportsNet		3-5	
Mar. 9	at No. 19 Texas		UFCU Disch–Falk Field • Austin, TX	**L** 9-15	Hansen (1-0)	**Wesneski** (0-1)	None	LHN	1,490	3-6	
Mar. 12	at Southeastern Louisiana		Pat Kenelly Diamond at Alumni Field • Hammond, LA	**L** 3-12	Kinzeler (2-1)	**Davis** (2-1)	None		895	3-7	0-1
Mar. 13	at Southeastern Louisiana		Pat Kenelly Diamond at Alumni Field • Hammond, LA	**L** 2-3 (7 inns)	Warren (3-0)	**Havlicek** (1-1)	None		837	3-8	0-2
Mar. 13	at Southeastern Louisiana		Pat Kenelly Diamond at Alumni Field • Hammond, LA	**L** 6-7	Hoskins (1-0)	**Lusk** (0-1)	None		849	3-9	0-3
Mar. 14	at Southeastern Louisiana		Pat Kenelly Diamond at Alumni Field • Hammond, LA	**L** 1-3	Stuprich (2-0)	**Driskell** (0-1)	Hoskins (1)	ESPN+	895	3-10	0-4
Mar. 19	Northwestern State		Don Sanders Stadium • Huntsville, TX	**W** 3-2	**Lusk** (1-1)	Makarewich (1-1)	None		412	4-10	1-4
Mar. 20	Northwestern State		Don Sanders Stadium • Huntsville, TX	**L** 1-3	Carver (3-1)	**Egli** (0-1)	None		412	4-11	1-5
Mar. 20	Northwestern State		Don Sanders Stadium • Huntsville, TX	**L** 2-3	David (1-1)	**Robinson** (0-1)	Ohnoutka (1)		412	4-12	1-6
Mar. 21	Northwestern State		Don Sanders Stadium • Huntsville, TX	**W** 6-3	**Atkinson** (1-1)	Michel (0-2)	**Lusk** (1)		412	5-12	2-6
Mar. 26	Texas A&M–Corpus Christi		Don Sanders Stadium • Huntsville, TX	**W** 13-2 (7 inns)	**Davis** (3-1)	Perez (1-3)	None		412	6-12	3-6
Mar. 27	Texas A&M–Corpus Christi		Don Sanders Stadium • Huntsville, TX	**L** 6-12 (7 inns)	Ramirez (1-1)	**Dillard** (0-3)	None		462	6-13	3-7
Mar. 27	Texas A&M–Corpus Christi		Don Sanders Stadium • Huntsville, TX	**W** 9-4	**Robinson** (1-1)	Gaddis (0-3)	**Lusk** (2)		462	7-13	4-7
Mar. 28	Texas A&M–Corpus Christi		Don Sanders Stadium • Huntsville, TX	**W** 7-6 (10 inns)	**Atkinson** (2-1)	Miller (0-2)	None		462	8-13	5-7

April (11-4)
Date	Opponent	Rank	Site/stadium	Score	Win	Loss D	Save	TV	Attendance	Overall record	SLC Record
Apr. 1	at Central Arkansas		Bear Stadium • Conway, AR	**W** 3-2	**Davis** (4-1)	Williams (0-1)	**Lusk** (3)		185	9-13	6-7
Apr. 2	at Central Arkansas		Bear Stadium • Conway, AR	**W** 2-0 (7 inns)	**Robinson** (2-1)	Moyer (1-3)	**Lusk** (4)		122	10-13	7-7
Apr. 2	at Central Arkansas		Bear Stadium • Conway, AR	**W** 3-1	**Dillard** (1-3)	Busey (0-1)	**Lusk** (5)		155	11-13	8-7
Apr. 3	at Central Arkansas		Bear Stadium • Conway, AR	**W** 10-4	**Atkinson** (3-1)	Gilbertson (1-1)	None		258	12-13	9-7
Apr. 6	Texas A&M		Don Sanders Stadium • Huntsville, TX	**W** 8-6	**Sembera** (1-0)	Childress (2-4)	**Lusk** (6)	ESPN+	462	13-13	
Apr. 9	at New Orleans		Maestri Field at Privateer Park • New Orleans, LA	**L** 7-9 (7 inns)	Turpin (5-1)	**Davis** (4-2)	Khachadourian (2)		286	13-14	9-8
Apr. 9	at New Orleans		Maestri Field at Privateer Park • New Orleans, LA	**W** 13-4	**Robinson** (3-1)	Mitchell (1-1)	None		286	14-14	10-8
Apr. 10	at New Orleans		Maestri Field at Privateer Park • New Orleans, LA	**L** 13-20	Kulivan (1-1)	**Sembera** (1-1)	Seroski (3)		262	14-15	10-9
Apr. 11	at New Orleans		Maestri Field at Privateer Park • New Orleans, LA	**W** 7-1	**Backhus** (1-0)	LeBlanc (0-2)	**Atkinson** (1)		283	15-15	11-9
Apr. 13	Baylor		Don Sanders Stadium • Huntsville, TX	**L** 1-4	Winston (5-2)	**Beard** (0-2)	Boyd (8)		462	15-16	
Apr. 17	McNeese State		Don Sanders Stadium • Huntsville, TX	**W** 6-2	**Davis** (5-2)	Hudgens (0-1)	None		512	16-16	12-9
Apr. 17	McNeese State		Don Sanders Stadium • Huntsville, TX	**W** 6-5 (14 inns)	**Wesneski** (1-1)	Foster (0-2)	None		512	17-16	13-9
Apr. 18	McNeese State		Don Sanders Stadium • Huntsville, TX	**W** 5-4 (7 inns)	**Atkinson** (4-1)	Ellison (2-2)	**Beard** (1)		512	18-16	14-9
Apr. 19	McNeese State		Don Sanders Stadium • Huntsville, TX	**W** 6-4	**Backhus** (2-0)	Vega (1-4)	**Havlicek** (2)		512	19-16	15-9
Apr. 23	Lamar		Don Sanders Stadium • Huntsville, TX	Game postponed due to COVID-19 protocol							
Apr. 24	Lamar		Don Sanders Stadium • Huntsville, TX	Game postponed due to COVID-19 protocol							
Apr. 25	Lamar		Don Sanders Stadium • Huntsville, TX	Game postponed due to COVID-19 protocol							
Apr. 25	Lamar		Don Sanders Stadium • Huntsville, TX	Game postponed due to COVID-19 protocol							
Apr. 30	at Stephen F. Austin		Jaycees Field • Nacogdoches, TX	**L** 3-6	Sgambelluri (3-3)	**Davis** (5-3)	Poell (2)		337	19-17	15-10

May (7–6)
Date	Opponent	Rank	Site/stadium	Score	Win	Loss	Save	TV	Attendance	Overall record	SLC Record
May 1	at Stephen F. Austin		Jaycees Field • Nacogdoches, TX	**L** 4-5 (10 inns)	Gauthe (2-2)	**Lusk** (1-2)	None		346	19-18	15-11
May 1	at Stephen F. Austin		Jaycees Field • Nacogdoches, TX	**W** 9-3 (7 inns)	**Backhus** (3-0)	Gennari (2-4)	None		346	20-18	16-11
May 2	at Stephen F. Austin		Jaycees Field • Nacogdoches, TX	Game cancelled							
May 7	Little Rock		Don Sanders Stadium • Huntsville, TX	**L** 3-5	Barkley (6-3)	**Dillard** (1-4)	None		462	20-19	
May 8	Little Rock		Don Sanders Stadium • Huntsville, TX	**W** 9-4	**Wesneski** (2-1)	Funk (1-5)	**Atkinson** (2)		462	21-19	
May 9	Little Rock		Don Sanders Stadium • Huntsville, TX	**W** 8-4	**Backhus** (4-0)	Weatherley (2-1)	None		462	22-19	
May 14	Abilene Christian		Don Sanders Stadium • Huntsville, TX	**L** 1-10	Morgan (1-3)	**Davis** (5-4)	None		462	22-20	16-12
May 15	Abilene Christian		Don Sanders Stadium • Huntsville, TX	**L** 6-12 (7 inns)	Huffling (7-1)	**Lusk** (1-3)	None		462	22-21	16-13
May 15	Abilene Christian		Don Sanders Stadium • Huntsville, TX	**W** 5-4	**Havlicek** (2-1)	Riley (6-2)	None		462	23-21	17-13
May 16	Abilene Christian		Don Sanders Stadium • Huntsville, TX	**L** 3-5	Chirpich (6-3)	**Backhus** (4-1)	Carlton (1)		372	23-22	17-14
May 21	at Nicholls		Ben Meyer Diamond at Ray E. Didier Field • Thibodaux, LA	**W** 11-4	**Davis** (6-4)	Gearing (4-5)	**Rudis** (1)		727	24-22	18-14
May 21	at Nicholls		Ben Meyer Diamond at Ray E. Didier Field • Thibodaux, LA	**W** 16-3 (7 inns)	**Robinson** (4-1)	Kilcrease (2-9)	**Peters** (1)		697	25-22	19-14
May 22	at Nicholls		Ben Meyer Diamond at Ray E. Didier Field • Thibodaux, LA	**W** 5-4 (7 inns)	**Atkinson** (5-1)	Desandro (3-4)	**Lusk** (7)		642	26-22	20-14
May 22	at Nicholls		Ben Meyer Diamond at Ray E. Didier Field • Thibodaux, LA	**L** 4-5 (11 inns)	Theriot (3-3)	**Wesneski** (2-2)	None		787	26-23	20-15

Postseason (4–2)

SLC Tournament (4–2)
Date	Opponent	Seed/Rank	Site/stadium	Score	Win	Loss	Save	TV	Attendance	Overall record	Tournament record
May 26	vs. (4) Texas A&M–Corpus Christi	(5)	Pat Kenelly Diamond at Alumni Field • Hammond, LA	**L** 3-4	Miller (3-3)	**Davis** (6-5)	None	ESPN+	812	26-24	0-1
May 27	vs. (8) Lamar	(5)	Pat Kenelly Diamond at Alumni Field • Hammond, LA	**W** 7-4	**Lusk** (2-3)	Dallas (2-3)	None	ESPN+	757	27-24	1-1
May 28	vs. (4) Texas A&M–Corpus Christi	(5)	Pat Kenelly Diamond at Alumni Field • Hammond, LA	**W** 14-2 (7 inns)	**Atkinson** (6-1)	Shy (0-5)	None	ESPN+	747	28-24	2-1
May 28	vs. (1) Abilene Christian	(5)	Pat Kenelly Diamond at Alumni Field • Hammond, LA	**W** 14-12	**Dillard** (2-4)	Cervantes (7-2)	**Lusk** (8)	ESPN+	968	29-24	3-1
May 29	vs. (1) Abilene Christian	(5)	Pat Kenelly Diamond at Alumni Field • Hammond, LA	**W** 15-13	**Beard** (1-2)	Chirpich (6-5)	**Lusk** (9)	ESPN+	817	30-24	4-1
May 29	vs. (7) McNeese State	(5)	Pat Kenelly Diamond at Alumni Field • Hammond, LA	**L** 1-2	Hudgens (2-3)	**Backhus** (4-2)	Foster (5)	ESPN+	903	30-25	4-2

Schedule source:

*Rankings are based on the team's current ranking in the D1Baseball poll.

== Postseason ==
=== Conference accolades ===
- Player of the Year: Colton Cowser – SHSU
- Hitter of the Year: Colton Eager – ACU
- Pitcher of the Year: Will Dion – MCNS
- Relief Pitcher of the Year: Tyler Cleveland – UCA
- Freshman of the Year: Brennan Stuprich – SELA
- Newcomer of the Year: Grayson Tatrow – ACU
- Clay Gould Coach of the Year: Rick McCarty – ACU

All Conference First Team

- Chase Kemp (LAMR)
- Nate Fisbeck (MCNS)
- Itchy Burts (TAMUCC)
- Bash Randle (ACU)
- Mitchell Dickson (ACU)
- Lee Thomas (UIW)
- Colton Cowser (SHSU)
- Colton Eager (ACU)
- Clayton Rasbeary (MCNS)
- Will Dion (MCNS)
- Brennan Stuprich (SELA)
- Will Warren (SELA)
- Tyler Cleveland (UCA)
- Anthony Quirion (LAMR)

All Conference Second Team

- Preston Faulkner (SELA)
- Daunte Stuart (NSU)
- Kasten Furr (UNO)
- Evan Keller (SELA)
- Skylar Black (SFA)
- Tre Obregon III (MCNS)
- Jack Rogers (SHSU)
- Pearce Howard (UNO)
- Grayson Tatrow (ACU)
- Chris Turpin (UNO)
- John Gaddis (TAMUCC)
- Trevin Michael (LAMR)
- Caleb Seroski (UNO)
- Jacob Burke (SELA)

All Conference Third Team

- Luke Marbach (TAMUCC)
- Salo Iza (UNO)
- Austin Cain (NICH)
- Darren Willis (UNO)
- Ryan Snell (LAMR)
- Tommy Cruz (ACU)
- Tyler Finke (SELA)
- Payton Harden (MCNS)
- Mike Williams (TAMUCC)
- Cal Carver (NSU)
- Levi David (NSU)
- Dominic Robinson (SHSU)
- Jack Dallas (LAMR)
- Brett Hammit (ACU)

All Conference Defensive Team

- Luke Marbach (TAMUCC)
- Nate Fisebeck (MCNS)
- Anthony Quirion (LAMR)
- Darren Willis (UNO)
- Gaby Cruz (SELA)
- Julian Gonzales (MCNS)
- Colton Cowser (SHSU)
- Avery George (LAMR)
- Will Dion (MCNS)

== 2021 MLB draft ==
Player	Position	Round	Overall	MLB team
Colton Cowser	OF	1	5	Baltimore Orioles
Jack Rogers	OF	9	270	Cincinnati Reds
