= 2012 Corpus Christi mayoral election =

- November 6, 2012
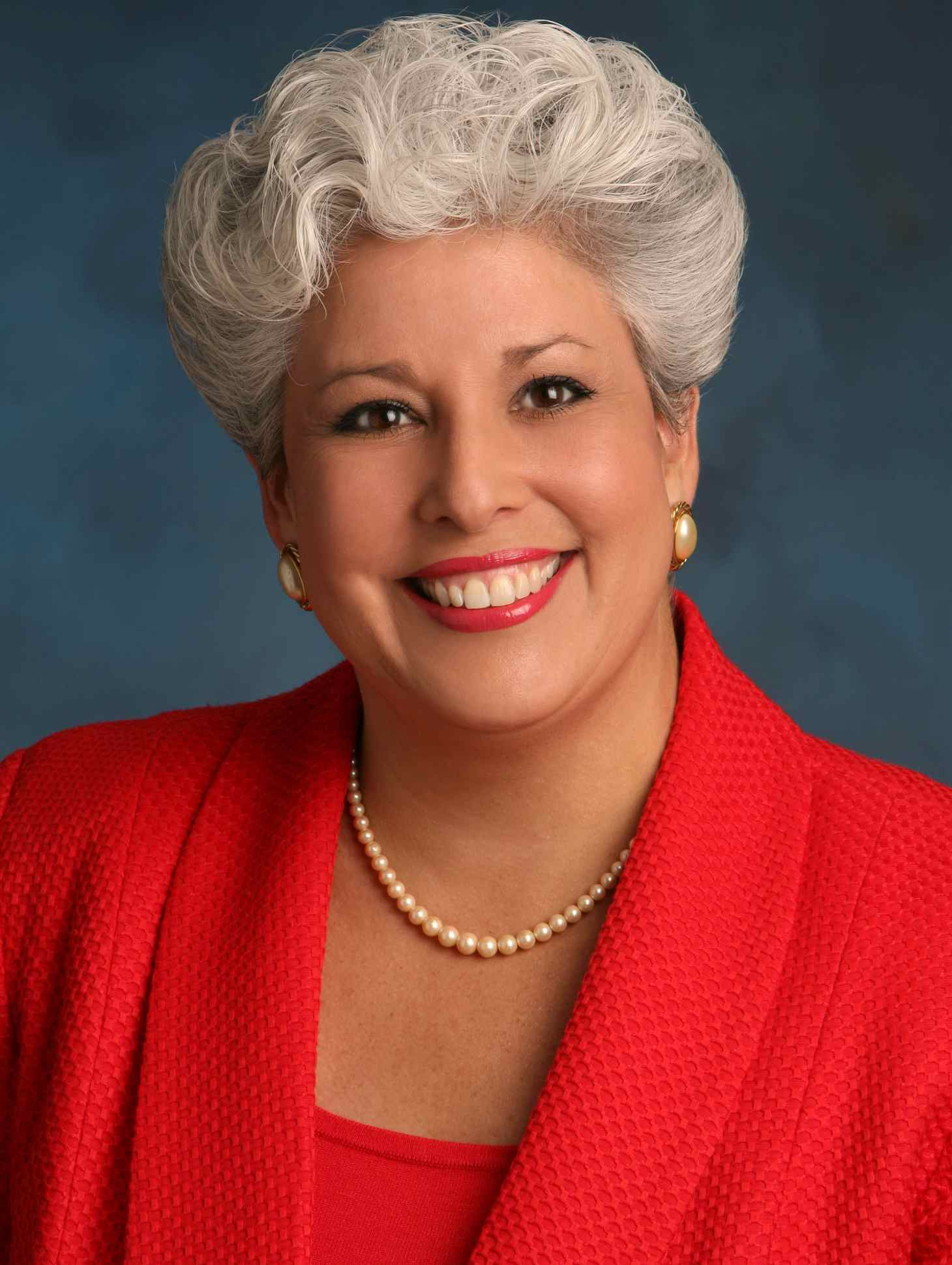

Candidate	Nelda Martinez	Chris N. Adler	Ray Madrigal
Party	Nonpartisan	Nonpartisan	Nonpartisan
Alliance	Democratic
Popular vote	38,117	26,853	4,106
Percentage	56.15%	32.75%	6.37%
Mayor before election
Joe Adame
Nonpartisan
Elected mayor
Nelda Martinez
Nonpartisan

The 2012 Corpus Christi mayoral election was held on November 6, 2012, to elect the mayor of Corpus Christi, Texas. It saw the election of Nelda Martinez.

== Results ==
Results
Candidate	Votes	%
Nelda Martinez	38,117	56.15
Chris N. Adler	26,853	32.75
Ray Madrigal	4,106	6.37
Josey Wales	3,231	4.73
Total votes	72,307	
