= Sam Houston Bearkats baseball =

- 2026 Sam Houston State Bearkats baseball team
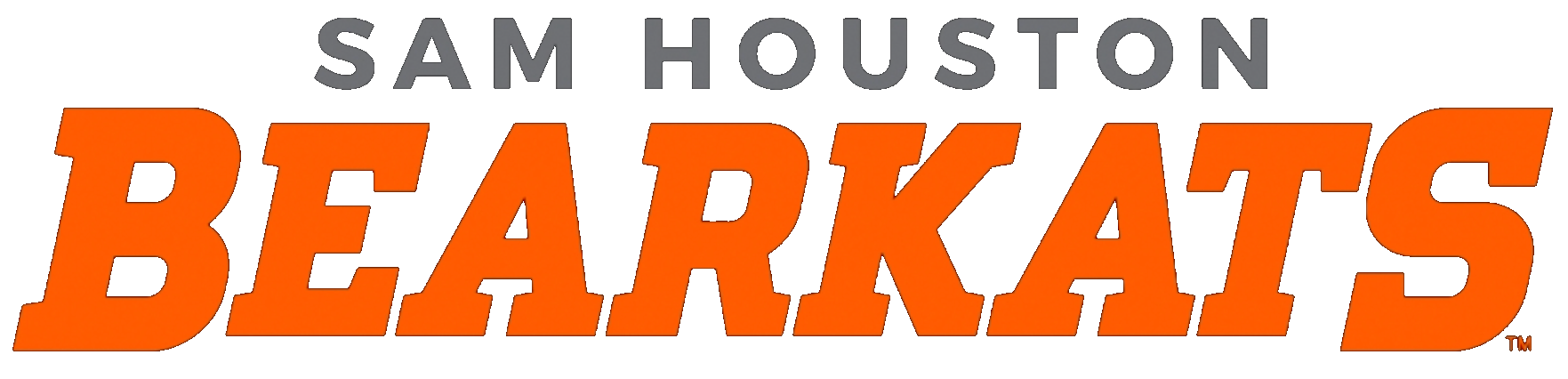
- Founded: 1906; 120 years ago
- University: Sam Houston State University
- Head coach: Jay Sirianni (7th season)
- Conference: C-USA
- Location: Huntsville, Texas
- Home stadium: Don Sanders Stadium (Capacity: 2,500)
- Nickname: Bearkats
- Colors: Orange and white

College World Series champions
- NAIA: 1963

College World Series appearances
- NAIA: 1960, 1961, 1962, 1963, 1964, 1965, 1974, 1975

NCAA regional champions
- 2017

NCAA tournament appearances
- NCAA Division II: 1984, 1985, 1986, NCAA Division I: 1987, 1989, 1996, 2007, 2008, 2009, 2012, 2013, 2014, 2016, 2017, 2023

Conference tournament champions
- Southland: 1996, 2007, 2008, 2009, 2016, 2017; WAC: 2023

Conference regular season champions
- Lone Star: 1954, 1955, 1981, 1982; Gulf Star: 1985, 1986, 1987; Southland: 1989, 2012, 2013, 2014, 2016, 2018

The Sam Houston State Bearkats baseball team is a varsity intercollegiate athletic team of Sam Houston State University in Huntsville, Texas, United States. The team is currently a member of Conference USA, an athletic conference in Division I of the National Collegiate Athletic Association (NCAA). The team plays its home games at Don Sanders Stadium.

== History ==
The first Sam Houston baseball team was fielded in 1906 and was the university's first collegiate athletic team. After disbandment following their 1926 campaign, the Bearkats returned in 1947 as a member of the Lone Star Conference. The modern era for the Bearkats baseball team began in 1949, as the Sam Houston athletic department does not include any statistics prior to the season in the program's record books. Since 1949, however, Sam Houston State baseball has been one of the most productive sports out of all the university athletic programs. The Bearkats boast an overall 1732-1134-7 (.604) WLT record from 1949 through the 2012 season. The Bearkats claim one national title from the NAIA World Series in 1963.

=== The Malone years (1949–1956) ===
To begin the modern era, Hayden "Hap" Malone, former graduate and professor of Physical Education at SHSTC was hired as the head baseball coach in 1949. As a NAIA independent in baseball, Hap Malone's Bearkats saw mixed results in his first 6 years as the Bearkats head coach. The program was quite successful from 1949 through 1950 as the Bearkats posted a combined 24–14 record in those two seasons (15–5 and 19–9 respectively). The next two seasons saw two losing records, (11–13 and 11–14). The 1953 and 1954 seasons were both winning seasons, with the Bearkats posting a 20 win record in 1954. However, the roller coaster ride was not over and the Kats once again fell into mediocrity in 1955–56. After the 1956 season resulting in 10–18 record, their lowest win total to date, Coach Malone was relieved of his duties. Hap Malone was inducted into Sam Houston Hall of Honor in 1971.

=== The Benge supremacy (1957–1968) ===
To right the ship left by Hap Malone, Sam Houston hired Ray Benge as the new head coach of the Bearkats. Ray Benge formerly pitched for Sam Houston in the early twenties before being drafted by the Phillies and playing 12 years in the Major Leagues. Benge proved to be the cure to ail all of the Bearkats woes as his teams never saw a losing record. Benge took the Bearkats to six straight NAIA Baseball World Series appearances including one national championship win in 1963 over Grambling. He finished with a 237–102 record and was inducted into SHSU's Hall of Honor with Hap Malone in 1971.

=== The Bob Britt years (1969–1975) ===
Despite being the university's shortest tenured coach (excluding current head coach David Pierce), Bob Britt continued the success of the baseball squad following Benge's departure. Like his predecessor, Britt also never head a losing season. He also coached the Bearkats to two NAIA Area Playoff berths in 1969 and 1970, and three NAIA World Series appearances in 1972, 1974, and in 1975 which all were top 3 finishes with the latter two seasons being national runner-up years. Britt also coached Sam Houston to its first two 40-win seasons in 1974 and 1975. He retired from coaching following the 1975 season, but continued to teach Physical Education as a professor at Sam Houston until 1995. Britt was inducted into Sam Houston Hall of Honor in 1979.

=== The John Skeeters era (1976–2002) ===
Coach John Skeeters was Sam Houston longest tenured baseball coach with over 25 years as the Bearkats' head coach. He picked up right were Britt left off as the Skeeters led Bearkats to winning seasons in his first 16 years as head coach. During this stretch, the Bearkats saw post-season action in 9 different years, including 4 NAIA Area Playoff berths from 1979 through 1982.

In 1984, the Bearkats moved into NCAA Division II and stayed here for three years as an independent and later as a member of the Gulf Star Conference. In Division II, the Bearkats were selected to the regional playoffs in all three years. The Bearkats also were the Gulf Star Champions in 1985 and 1986.

In 1987, the Gulf Star Conference moved up into Division I. In addition to winning the Gulf Star Conference championship in 1987, Sam Houston State also earned a berth into its first Division I regional thanks to a 44–18–1 record, its highest win total to date.

The Bearkats moved to the Southland Conference in 1988 and while they struggled in conference play (11–10 record), they still managed to earn a winning record, finishing 32–25. Despite a rough first season in the Southland, Sam Houston quickly acclimated to its new home and won the 1989 conference championship. In addition to the championship, Sam Houston earned a berth to the NCAA regionals. Following the 1989 season, the Bearkats would not win another conference championship again until Coach Pierce took over in 2012, and would only go to the NCAA regionals once more under Coach Skeeters (1996).

Following four straight losing seasons from 1999–2002, Skeeters decided to resign as head coach of the Sam Houston Bearkats. His overall mark of 860 wins and 628 losses will cement his legacy as the longest tenured coach for years to come.

=== Chris Rupp's Bearkats (2003–2006) ===
Chris Rupp was hired following Skeeters' resignation prior to the 2003 season. In his four years as head coach, Rupp's teams failed to finish with a winning season. In 2006, he resigned as the head coach and finished with an overall record of 86–123 record.

=== The Mark Johnson years (2007–2012) ===
Mark Johnson, former Texas A&M coaching legend and member of the American Baseball Coaches Association and Texas Baseball halls of fame, took over as head coach a little more than a month after Rupp's resignation and immediately began working on improving the baseball team. Johnson brought in two full-time assistants to his coaching staff, a luxury the previous two Bearkats coaches did not have. There was seemingly no rebuilding stage for the Bearkats, as Johnson led Sam Houston to a 40–24 record his first year as coach, only a year removed from a 23–31 season under Chris Rupp. Since Johnson joined the Bearkat staff as head coach, the team saw post season action in 4 of his 5 seasons at Sam Houston, including 3 NCAA regional appearances.

=== Under David Pierce (2012–2014) ===
==== 2012 ====
David Pierce, who joined the staff in 2011 from Rice, continued where Johnson left off, as the 2012 baseball team saw its best ever Regional finish (2nd) and coached the Bearkats to its first outright league title in 23 years. The 2012 Bearkats lost in the regional title game to Arkansas, who would eventually go on to become a Super Regional Champion to earn a berth in the College World Series. Coach Pierce would later win both the Southland Conference Coach of the Year and the ABCA Coach of the Year at the end of the season.

==== 2013 ====
The start of the 2013 season came with very high expectations for Coach Pierce and the Bearkats. Coming into the season, the Kats received votes in the NCBWA poll and was picked to repeat as Southland Conference champions by the Coaches' and SID polls. After a disappointing 3–4 start, the Bearkats would go on to beat then #22 ranked Texas in Austin, and then #19 ranked Rice in Houston to right the ship. Following these big games, however, Sam Houston would lose back to back series' against UCONN and Dallas Baptist. Following these games, the Bearkats went 13–8 in their next 21, including wins over #17 Rice and #19 Houston, but lost a major home series to Oral Roberts which dropped SHSU's Ratings Percentage Index (RPI) far enough down to put an at-large bid for the 2013 regionals in jeopardy. Sam Houston accepted the challenge and worked its way back to finish the season going 13–1 after the Oral Roberts series, earning the #27 spot in the Collegiate Baseball poll. On May 17, 2013, Sam Houston clinched its second straight outright Southland Conference Title with a 4–0 shutout of Central Arkansas. Following the regular season, Coach Pierce would win the Conference Coach of the Year award yet again, and would earn an at-large bid to the NCAA tournament Baton Rouge Regional after failing to win the Southland Conference Tournament. In the NCAA tournament, the Bearkats defeated Louisiana-Lafayette in the first game 4–2 behind Luke Plucheck's 3 RBIs. In the winner's bracket, Sam Houston faced regional host and #1 overall LSU Tigers. With the help of a 5 run first inning the Bearkats led the top ranked Tigers 5–4 until the 8th inning. Sam Houston could not upset the Tigers, losing in heartbreaking fashion 8–5. In the last day of the Baton Rouge regional, Sam Houston faced the Ragin' Cajuns for the second time in three days. Sam Houston would jump out to a 3–0 lead, but errors would send the Bearkats home early, as they lost the final game of the season 5–7.

== SHSU career coaching records ==
Coach	Number of Seasons	Overall record	Winning Percentage
Hap Malone	8; (1949–1956)	112–92	.549
Ray Benge	12; (1957–1968)	237–102	.699
Bob Britt	7; (1969–1975)	225–88	.719
John Skeeters	27; (1976–2002)	860–621	.581
Chris Rupp	4; (2003–2006)	86–123	.411
Mark Johnson	5; (2007–2011)	127–109	.538
David Pierce	3; (2012–2014)	122–63	.650
Matt Deggs	5; (2015–2019)	187–118	.613
Jay Sirianni	5; (2020–present)	141–106	.571

== Year-by-year results ==
Year	Division	Overall Record	Conference Record	Notes
1949	Hap Malone	15–5	–	First season in modern era.
1950	Hap Malone	19–9	–	
1951	Hap Malone	11–13	–	
1952	Hap Malone	11–14	–	
1953	Hap Malone	14–11	–	
1954	Hap Malone	20–7	–	
1955	Hap Malone	12–15	–	
1956	Hap Malone	10–18	–	
1957	Ray Benge	17–8	–	
1958	Ray Benge	15–6	–	
1959	Ray Benge	13–3	–	
1960	Ray Benge	23–11	–	NAIA World Series
1961	Ray Benge	19–11	–	NAIA World Series
1962	Ray Benge	22–11	–	NAIA World Series
1963	Ray Benge	27–8	-	NAIA National Champions
1964	Ray Benge	27–8	–	NAIA World Series
1965	Ray Benge	22–8	–	NAIA World Series
1966	Ray Benge	16–12	–	
1967	Ray Benge	20–7	–	
1968	Ray Benge	16–9	–	
1969	Bob Britt	24–11	–	NAIA Area playoffs
1970	Bob Britt	33–9	–	NAIA Area playoffs
1971	Bob Britt	23–18	–	
1972	Bob Britt	33–13	–	NAIA World Series
1973	Bob Britt	27–12	–	
1974	Bob Britt	42–11	–	NAIA World Series
1975	Bob Britt	43–14	–	NAIA World Series
1976	John Skeeters	30–20	–	
1977	John Skeeters	37–16	–	
1978	John Skeeters	33–20–1	–	
1979	John Skeeters	38–14	–	NAIA Area playoffs
1980	John Skeeters	40–16	–	NAIA Area playoffs
1981	John Skeeters	38–18	–	NAIA Area playoffs
1982	John Skeeters	33–23	–	NAIA Area playoffs
1983	John Skeeters	33–23–1	–	
1984	John Skeeters	42–18	–	NCAA Division II Regionals
1985	John Skeeters	35–21	12–6	NCAA Division II Regionals
1986	John Skeeters	45–17	16–4	NCAA Division II Regionals
1987	John Skeeters	44–18–1	17–3	NCAA Regionals
1988	John Skeeters	32–25	11–10	
1989	John Skeeters	31–23	13–5	Southland Conference Regular season champions, NCAA Regionals
1990	John Skeeters	34–22–1	11–6	
1991	John Skeeters	33–17	9–5	
1992	John Skeeters	28–28	10–11	
1993	John Skeeters	30–26	13–9	Southland Tournament
1994	John Skeeters	29–24	15–9	Southland Tournament
1995	John Skeeters	22–32	10–14	
1996	John Skeeters	31–29	15–15	Southland Tournament champions, NCAA Regionals
1997	John Skeeters	26–27	17–11	Southland Tournament, NCAA Regionals
1998	John Skeeters	29–28	12–10	Southland Tournament
1999	John Skeeters	22–23	8–19	
2000	John Skeeters	25–29	14–13	Southland Tournament
2001	John Skeeters	19–31	8–19	
2002	John Skeeters	21–33	9–18	
2003	Chris Rupp	20–33	9–18	
2004	Chris Rupp	19–30–1	11–14	
2005	Chris Rupp	24–29–2	13–14	
2006	Chris Rupp	23–31	12–18	
2007	Mark Johnson	40–24	18–12	Southland Tournament champions, NCAA Regionals
2008	Mark Johnson	37–25	18–12	Southland Tournament champions, NCAA Regionals
2009	Mark Johnson	36–24	18–14	Southland Tournament champions, NCAA Regionals
2010	Mark Johnson	19–36	11–22	
2011	Mark Johnson	35–24	17–16	Southland Tournament
2012	David Pierce	40–22	24–9	Southland Conference Regular season champions, Southland Tournament, NCAA Regionals
2013	David Pierce	38–22	20–7	Southland Conference Regular season champions, Southland Tournament, NCAA Regionals
2014	David Pierce	44–19	20–7	Southland Conference Regular season champions, Southland Tournament, NCAA Regionals
2015	Matt Deggs	31–28	17–12	Southland Tournament
2016	Matt Deggs	42–22	24–6	Southland Conference Regular season champions, Southland Tournament champions, NCAA Regionals
2017	Matt Deggs	44–23	19–11	Southland Tournament champions, NCAA Regionals champions, NCAA Super Regionals
2018	Matt Deggs	39–20	24–6	Southland Conference Regular season champions, Southland Tournament
2019	Matt Deggs	31–25	20–10	Southland Conference Regular season champions, Southland Tournament
2020	Jay Sirianni	7–7	1–2	Season cancelled due to the COVID-19 pandemic.
2021	Jay Sirianni	30–25	20–15	Southland Tournament
2022	Jay Sirianni	31–25	21–9	Western Athletic Conference Tournament
2023	Jay Sirianni	39–25	21–8	Western Athletic Conference Tournament champions, NCAA Regionals
2024	Jay Sirianni	33-22	13-11	Conference USA Tournament

Source: Sam Houston Baseball Record Book

== Post season appearances ==
=== Conference tournaments ===
Year	Conference	Record	%	Finished
1993	Southland	2–2	.500	2nd
1994	Southland	0–2	.000	4th
1996	Southland	4–0	1.000	Champions
1997	Southland	2–2	.500	3rd
1998	Southland	2–2	.500	3rd
2000	Southland	1–2	.333	4th
2007	Southland	4–0	1.000	Champions
2008	Southland	4–0	1.000	Champions
2009	Southland	4–0	1.000	Champions
2011	Southland	1–2	.333	5th
2012	Southland	2–2	.500	3rd
2013	Southland	1–2	.333	5th
2014	Southland	1–2	.333	5th
2015	Southland	3–2	.600	2nd
2016	Southland	4–1	.800	Champions
2017	Southland	4-0	1.000	Champions
2018	Southland	1-2	.333	5th
2019	Southland	1-2	.333	5th
2021	Southland	3–1	.750	2nd
2022	Western Athletic	0–2	.000	8th
2023	Western Athletic	5–1	.833	Champions
2024	CUSA	1-2	.333	5th
Total		50–31	.630	22 Appearances

=== National tournaments ===
Year	Division	Record	%	Notes
1960	NAIA	2–2	.500	CWS 4th place
1961	NAIA	1–1	.500	CWS 5th place
1962	NAIA	1–2	.333	CWS 6th place
1963	NAIA	4–0	1.000	NAIA National Champions
1964	NAIA	1–2	.333	CWS 4th place
1965	NAIA	2–2	.500	CWS 4th place
1969	NAIA	2–2	.500	Area playoffs 2nd place
1970	NAIA	1–2	.333	Area playoffs 2nd place
1972	NAIA	5–3	.625	Area Champions, CWS 3rd place
1974	NAIA	6–2	.750	Area Champions, CWS Runner-Up
1975	NAIA	7–3	.700	Area Champions, CWS Runner-Up
1979	NAIA	2–2	.500	Area Runner-Up
1980	NAIA	1–2	.333	Area playoffs 3rd place
1981	NAIA	2–2	.500	Area Runner-Up
1982	NAIA	0–2	.000	Area playoffs 4th place
NAIA Total		37–29	.560	15 Appearances
1984	NCAA D-II	0–2	.000	Brookings Regional 5th place
1985	NCAA D-II	2–2	.500	Romeoville Regional 3rd place
1986	NCAA D-II	2–2	.500	Troy Regional 3rd place
1987	NCAA D-I	2–2	.500	Austin Regional 3rd place
1989	NCAA D-I	0–2	.000	Austin Regional 5th place
1996	NCAA D-I	1–2	.333	Austin Regional 3rd place
2007	NCAA D-I	2–2	.500	Oxford Regional Runner-Up
2008	NCAA D-I	0–2	.000	Houston Regional 4th place
2009	NCAA D-I	0–2	.000	Houston Regional 4th place
2012	NCAA D-I	2–2	.500	Houston Regional Runner-Up
2013	NCAA D-1	1–2	.333	Baton Rouge Regional 3rd place
2014	NCAA D-1	2–2	.500	Fort Worth regional Runner-Up
2016	NCAA D-1	1-2	.333	Lafayette Regional 3rd Place
2017	NCAA D-1	4-3	.571	1st Place Lubbock Regional, Tallahassee Super Regional
2023	NCAA D-1	1-2	.333	Baton Rouge Regional 3rd Place
NCAA Total		19–31	.380	15 Appearances
Total		56-60	.483	30 Appearances

Source: Sam Houston Record Book: Post Season Results

== Notable players ==
Many of Sam Houston baseball players earned various awards and honors, including 95 All-Conference players, 16 All-Americans, and 7 conference award winners. Film director Richard Linklater also played baseball at Sam Houston.

=== All-Americans ===
The Bearkats have produced 16 All-Americans across three different divisions (NAIA, NCAA D-I, and NCAA D-II). Four of these players earned the honor in multiple years.

- NAIA All-America

Alton Arnold, 1960 HM, 1961 1T, 1962 hm
Fred Beene, 1963 1T, 1964 1T
Doyle Campbell, 1975 HM
Jud Chamblee, 1981 HM
Albert Choate, 1965 2T
Floyd Ciruti, 1972 1T
Richard Dyer, 1961 HM
Jimmy Dodd, 1963 2T, 1965 1T
David Woolley, 1974 1T

Jackie Heard, 1974 1T Jim Miller, 1974 1T

- NCAA D-II All-America

Richard Johnson, 1983 3T 1985 1T
Bryan McDonald, 1986 1T
Terry Pirtle, 1986 1T

- NCAA D-I All-America

Kelly Eddlemon, 1999 1T
Douglas Moulder, 1999 2T
Luke Prihoda, 2007 1T
Bobby Verbick, 2007 1T
Todd Sebek, 2008 3T
Nick Zaleski, 2009 HM
Sam Odom, 2014
Riley Gossett, 2016 F
Heath Donica, 2017 3T
Hayden Wesneski, 2015 F
Colton Cowser, 2019 F, 2021 1T, 2022 1T

1T denotes 1st Team selection, 2T denotes 2nd Team selection, 3T denotes 3rd Team selection, HM denotes Honorable Mention, and F denotes freshman selection.

=== Post-season awards ===
Sam Houston has had multiple players earn end-of-the-season awards, such as Pitcher of the Year, Player of the Year, and Newcomer of the Year. These awards were handed out by the Gulf Star Conference from 1985 through 1987, the Southland Conference from 1988 through 2021, and the Western Athletic Conference in 2022 and 2023.

Conference honors

- Player of the Year

Richard Johnson, 1985
Terry Pirtle, 1986 and 1987
Anthony Azar, 2014
Colton Cowser, 2021 and 2022

- Hitter of the Year

Colton Cowser, 2019

- Pitcher of the Year

Kenneth Garza, 1989
Steve Prihoda, 1994
Greg Kubes, 1997
Luke Prihoda, 2007
Heath Donica, 2017

- Coach of the Year

John Skeeters, 1989
David Pierce, 2013 & 2014
Matt Deggs, 2016

- Newcomer of the Year

Isaias Garcia, 2005

- Relief Pitcher of the Year

Dakota Mills, 2018

- Freshman of the Year

Hayden Wesneski 2017

In 2001 the Bearkats set a new tournament record for runs scored in a game with 22. Third baseman Douglas Moulder and right fielder Josh Harrison both contributed with 2 home runs and 7 RBIs each, also tying each other for the tournament record. Harrison also stole 3 bases in the game. For Moulder, it was his 9th multi-homer game of the season< a school record.

Harrison and Moulder are also tied for the longest home run at Bearkats Stadium. In 1998 Harrison blasted a shot 437 ft. The following year, Moulder launched a ball the same distance in his second hit as a Bearkat.

Seven players have also been selected as the conference tournament's Most Valuable Player:

- Brent Bubela, 1996
- Douglas Moulder, 1999
- Luke Prihoda, 2007
- Bobby Verbick, 2008
- Matt Shelton, 2009
- Heath Donica, 2016
- Robie Rojas, 2017
- Walker Janek, 2023

Source: Houston State Record Book: Postseason Honors

=== Players in Major League Baseball ===
As of the 2021 Major League Baseball season, Sam Houston has had 16 former members go on to play Major League Baseball:

Player Name	Years at SHSU	Years in MLB
Ray Benge	1922–1925	1925–1938
Larry Miggins	1946–1946	1948, 1952
Ken Boswell	1965–1965	1967–1977
Fred Beene	1962–1964	1968–1975
Phil Hennigan	1965–1965	1969–1973
Jamie Easterly	1967–1970	1974–1987
Rick Matula	1973–1975	1979–1981
Billy Smith	1974–1977	1981-1981
Glenn Wilson	1978–1980	1982–1993
Don Welchel	1976–1978	1982–1983
Steve Sparks	1986–1987	1995–2004
Jordan Tata	2002–2003	2006–2007
Robert Manuel	2005–2005	2009–2010
Ryan Tepera	2006–2009	2015–2023
Caleb Smith	2011–2013	2017–2022
Ryan O'Hearn	2012–2014	2018–present
Colton Cowser	2019–2021	2023–present

== See also ==
- List of NCAA Division I baseball programs
