= Adamle =

Adamle is a surname. Notable people with the surname include:

- Mike Adamle (born 1949), American football running back and sports broadcaster
- Tony Adamle (1924–2000), American football running back, father of Mike

== See also ==
- Adame
