= 2016 Corpus Christi mayoral election =

Corpus Christi mayoral election, 2016
- November 8, 2016
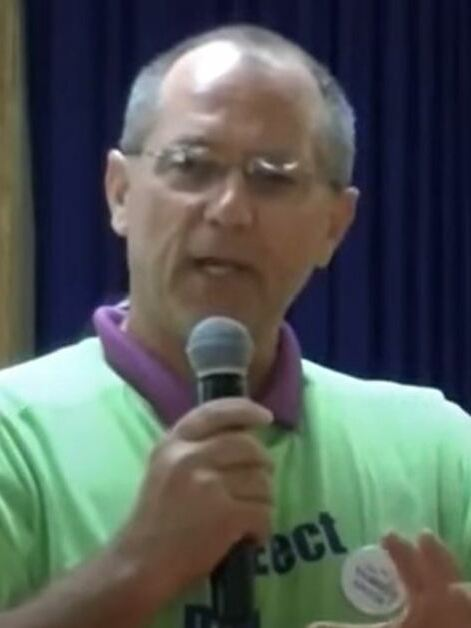

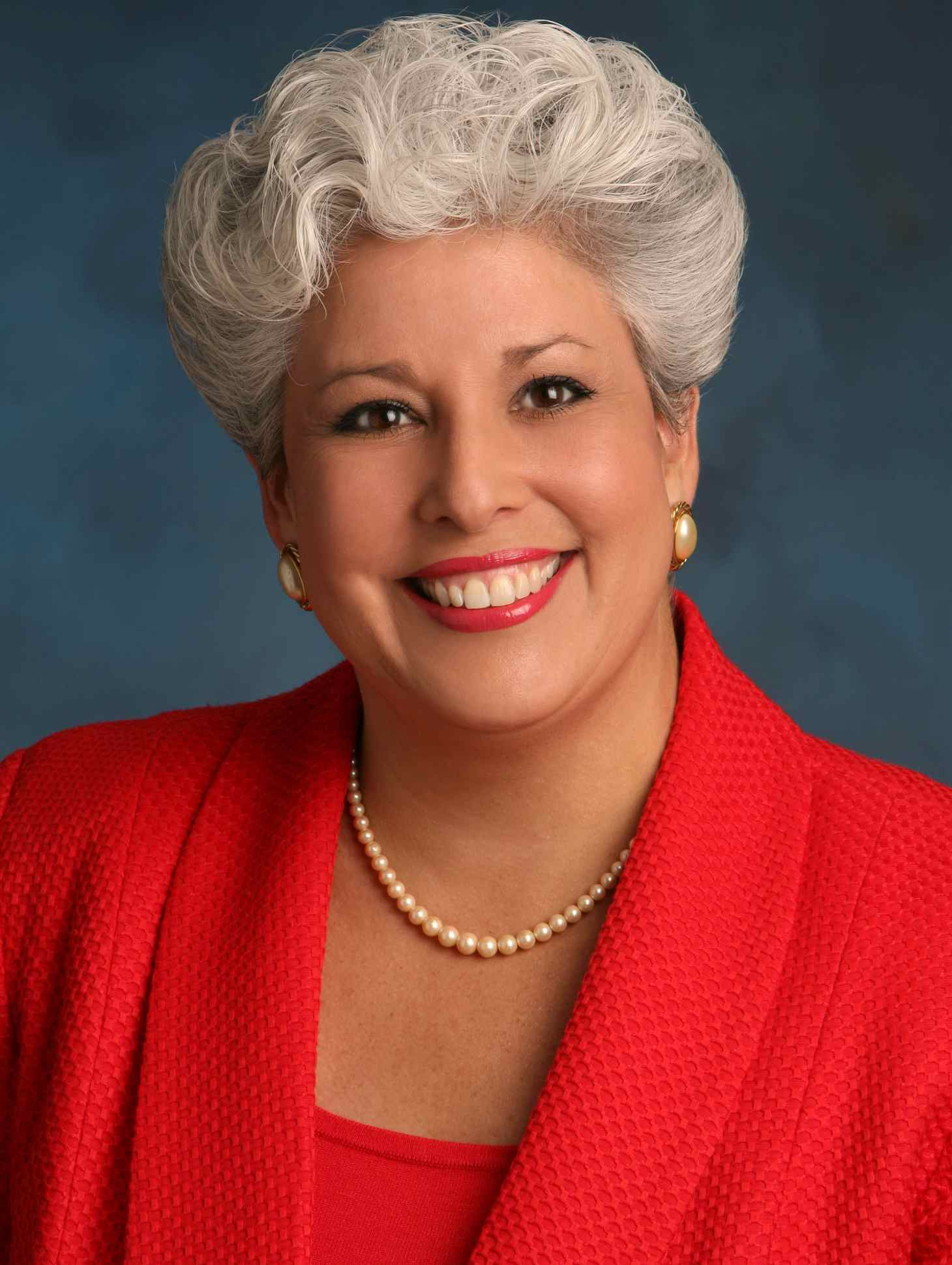
Candidate	Dan McQueen	Nelda Martinez
Party	Nonpartisan	Nonpartisan
Alliance	Republican	Democratic
Popular vote	43,736	35,782
Percentage	55.0%	45.0%
Mayor before election
Nelda Martinez
Nonpartisan
Elected mayor
Dan McQueen
Nonpartisan

The 2016 Corpus Christi mayoral election was held on November 8, 2016, to elect the mayor of Corpus Christi, Texas. It saw the election of Dan McQueen, who unseated incumbent mayor Nelda Martinez.

== Results ==
Results
Candidate	Votes	%
Dan McQueen	43,736	55.0
Nelda Martinez (incumbent)	35,782	45.0
Total votes	79,518	
