= 2014 Corpus Christi mayoral election =

Corpus Christi mayoral election, 2014
- November 4, 2014
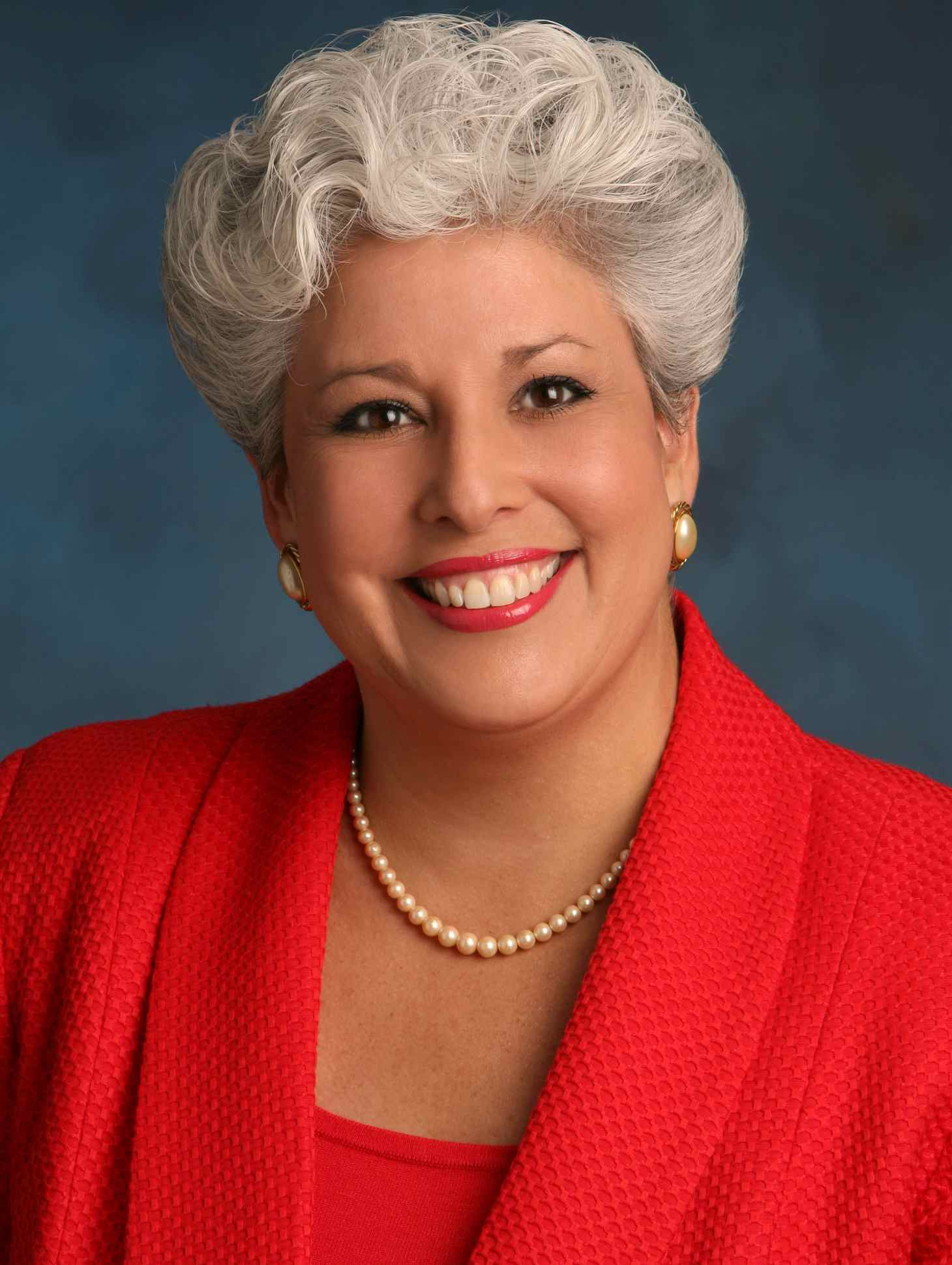

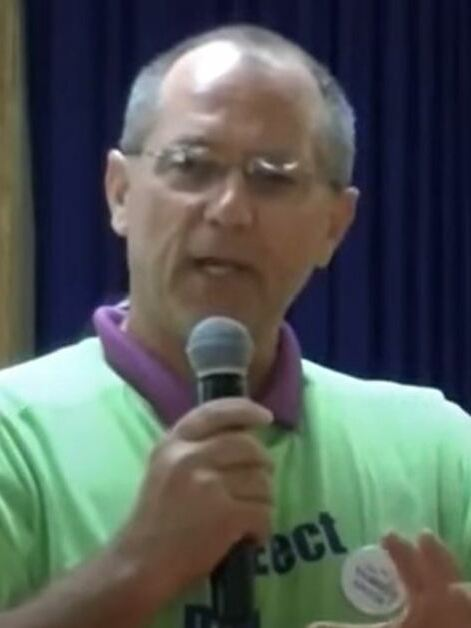
| Candidate | Nelda Martinez | Bob Jones | Dan McQueen |
| Party | Nonpartisan | Nonpartisan | Nonpartisan |
| Alliance | Democratic | Republican | Republican |
| Popular vote | 23,141 | 13,254 | 6,106 |
| Percentage | 51.76% | 29.65% | 13.66% |
Mayor before election
Nelda Martinez
Nonpartisan
Elected mayor
Nelda Martinez
Nonpartisan

The 2014 Corpus Christi mayoral election was held on November 4, 2014, to elect the mayor of Corpus Christi, Texas. It saw the reelection of Nelda Martinez.

== Results ==
Results
| Candidate | Votes | % |
|---|---|---|
| Nelda Martinez (incumbent) | 23,141 | 51.76 |
| Bob Jones | 13,254 | 29.65 |
| Dan McQueen | 6,106 | 13.66 |
| Lee McGinnis | 2,206 | 4.93 |
| Total votes | 44,707 | |
