= Hayden Wesneski =

American baseball player (born 1997)

Houston Astros – No. 39
- Pitcher
- Born: December 5, 1997 (age 28); Houston, Texas, U.S.
- Bats: Right Throws: Right

MLB debut
- September 6, 2022, for the Chicago Cubs

MLB statistics (through 2026 season)
- Win–loss record: 16–18
- Earned run average: 3.85
- Strikeouts: 258
- Stats at Baseball Reference

Teams
- Chicago Cubs (2022–2024); Houston Astros (2025–present)

Hayden Gregory Wesneski (born December 5, 1997) is an American professional baseball pitcher for the Houston Astros of Major League Baseball (MLB). He has previously played in MLB for the Chicago Cubs, with whom he made his MLB debut in 2022.

== Amateur career ==
Wesneski attended Cy-Fair High School in Cypress, Texas. He played for the school's baseball team, and had a 25–9 win–loss record and a 3.56 earned run average (ERA). He graduated in 2016. The Tampa Bay Rays selected Wesneski in the 33rd round of the 2016 MLB draft, but he instead enrolled at Sam Houston State University to play college baseball for the Sam Houston State Bearkats.

== Professional career ==
=== New York Yankees ===
The New York Yankees selected Wesneski in the sixth round of the 2019 Major League Baseball draft. He received a $217,500 signing bonus and played for the Pulaski Yankees after he signed, going 1–1 with a 4.76 ERA over 28 1/3 innings. He began the 2021 season with the Hudson Valley Renegades and was promoted to the Somerset Patriots and the Scranton/Wilkes-Barre RailRiders during the season. Over 25 games (24 starts) between the three teams, he went 11–6 with a 3.25 ERA and 151 strikeouts over 130 1/3 innings. Wesnewski returned to Scranton/Wilkes-Barre in 2022.

=== Chicago Cubs ===
On August 1, 2022, the Yankees traded Wesneski to the Chicago Cubs for relief pitcher Scott Effross. The Cubs assigned him to the Iowa Cubs, with whom he was 0-2 with a 5.66 ERA. The Cubs promoted Wesneski to the major leagues on September 6. He debuted that day and pitched five scoreless innings with eight strikeouts en route to his first career win. On September 22, Wesneski pitched an immaculate inning versus the Pittsburgh Pirates. He finished his rookie campaign with a 2.18 ERA in 6 games.

In 2023, Wesneski made 34 appearances (11 starts) for the Cubs, and registered a 3–5 record and 4.63 ERA with 83 strikeouts across 89 1/3 innings pitched. Wesneski was optioned to Triple–A Iowa to begin the 2024 season. He made 28 appearances for Chicago, posting a 3–6 record and 3.86 ERA with 67 strikeouts across 67 2/3 innings pitched.

=== Houston Astros ===
On December 13, 2024, the Cubs traded Wesneski, Isaac Paredes, and Cam Smith to the Houston Astros in exchange for Kyle Tucker. He made six starts for Houston, logging a 1-3 record and 4.50 ERA with 29 strikeouts across 32 innings pitched. Following a May 6 start against the Milwaukee Brewers, the Astros placed Wesneski on the 15-day injured list with right elbow discomfort. On May 18, it was announced that Wesneski would undergo Tommy John surgery, ruling him out for the rest of the season.

On March 30, 2026, Wesneski was placed on the 60-day injured list as he continued to recover from surgery. He was activated for his season debut on July 29. On September 2, Wesneski surrendered just one hit over seven shutout innings versus the Chicago White Sox to obtain a game score of 78. He made 11 appearances, all starts, and had a 6–2 record with a 3.25 ERA and 1.131 WHIP over 61 innings pitched.

== See also ==
- List of Major League Baseball pitchers who have thrown an immaculate inning
- List of Sam Houston State University alumni
