= Jay Sirianni =

American baseball player and coach

Current position
- Title: Head coach
- Team: Sam Houston
- Conference: Conference USA
- Record: 153–149

Biographical details
- Born: July 17, 1975 (age 50); Des Moines, Iowa, U.S.

Playing career
- 1995: Texas A&M
- 1996–1999: Nebraska
- 1999: Mahoning Valley Scrappers
- 1999: Burlington Indians
- 2000: Kinston Indians
- 2000: Columbus Red Stixx
- Position: Pitcher

Coaching career (HC unless noted)
- 2002–2004: Barton County C. C. (P)
- 2005–2014: UT Arlington (P)
- 2015–2019: Sam Houston State (P)
- 2020–present: Sam Houston

Head coaching record
- Overall: 153–149
- Tournaments: NCAA: 0–2

Accomplishments and honors

Championships
- WAC Regular Season (2023); WAC Tournament (2023)

John F. Sirianni (born July 17, 1975) is an American baseball coach and former pitcher. He is the head baseball coach at Sam Houston State University. Sirianni played college baseball at Texas A&M University in 1995 and at the University of Nebraska–Lincoln from 1996 to 1999 for coach Dave Van Horn and in Minor League Baseball (MiLB) for two seasons from 1999 to 2000.

Sirianni was born in Des Moines, Iowa. He attended Indianola High School in Indianola, Iowa. After graduation from high school, he decided to attend Texas A&M University to play baseball. After his freshman year, he transferred to play college baseball at the University of Nebraska–Lincoln. After his senior season, he was signed as a free agent with the Cleveland Indians.

In 2019, Sirianni was named the head coach of the Sam Houston State Bearkats baseball program, succeeding Matt Deggs.

== Playing career ==
Sirianni attended Indianola High School where he was a member of the school's football and baseball teams. After graduation, Sirianni choose to attend Texas A&M University. After a single season at Texas A&M, Sirianni transferred to Nebraska. Sirianni pitched 4 seasons for the Cornhuskers. Leading the team in innings pitched and wins in 1998.

== Coaching career ==
From 2002 to August, 2004, Sirianni was the pitching coach at Barton County Community College.

On August 2, 2004, Sirianni was named the pitching coach at UT Arlington.

On July 25, 2019, Sirianni was promoted to the head coach of the Bearkats.

Statistics overview
Season	Team	Overall	Conference	Standing	Postseason
Sam Houston State Bearkats (Southland Conference) (2020–2021)
2020	Sam Houston State	7–7	1–2		Season canceled due to COVID-19
2021	Sam Houston State	30–25	20–15	4th	Southland Tournament
Sam Houston State:			21–17		
Sam Houston State Bearkats (Western Athletic Conference) (2022–2023)
2022	Sam Houston State	31–25	21–9	1st (Southwest)	WAC Tournament
2023	Sam Houston	39–25	22–8	1st	NCAA Regional
Sam Houston State:			43–17		
Sam Houston Bearkats (Conference USA) (2024–present)
2024	Sam Houston	34–24	13–11	4th	C-USA Tournament
2025	Sam Houston	12–43	6–21	10th	
Sam Houston State:		153–149	19–32		
Total:		153–149			
National champion Postseason invitational champion Conference regular season champion Conference regular season and conference tournament champion Division regular season champion Division regular season and conference tournament champion Conference tournament champion

== See also ==
- List of current NCAA Division I baseball coaches
