= Adame =

Adame is both a surname and a given name. It may refer to:

Surname:

- Alfredo Adame (born 1958), Mexican actor
- Joe Adame (born 1945), American politician
- Marco Antonio Adame (born 1960), Mexican politician
- Lucy Adame-Clark (born 1972), 1st woman elected as Bexar County Clerk in Bexar County history, American politician

Given name:

- Adame Ba Konaré (born 1947), Malian historian and writer
