= 2017 Corpus Christi mayoral special election =

Corpus Christi mayoral special election, 2017
- May 7, 2017
- Turnout: 12.41%

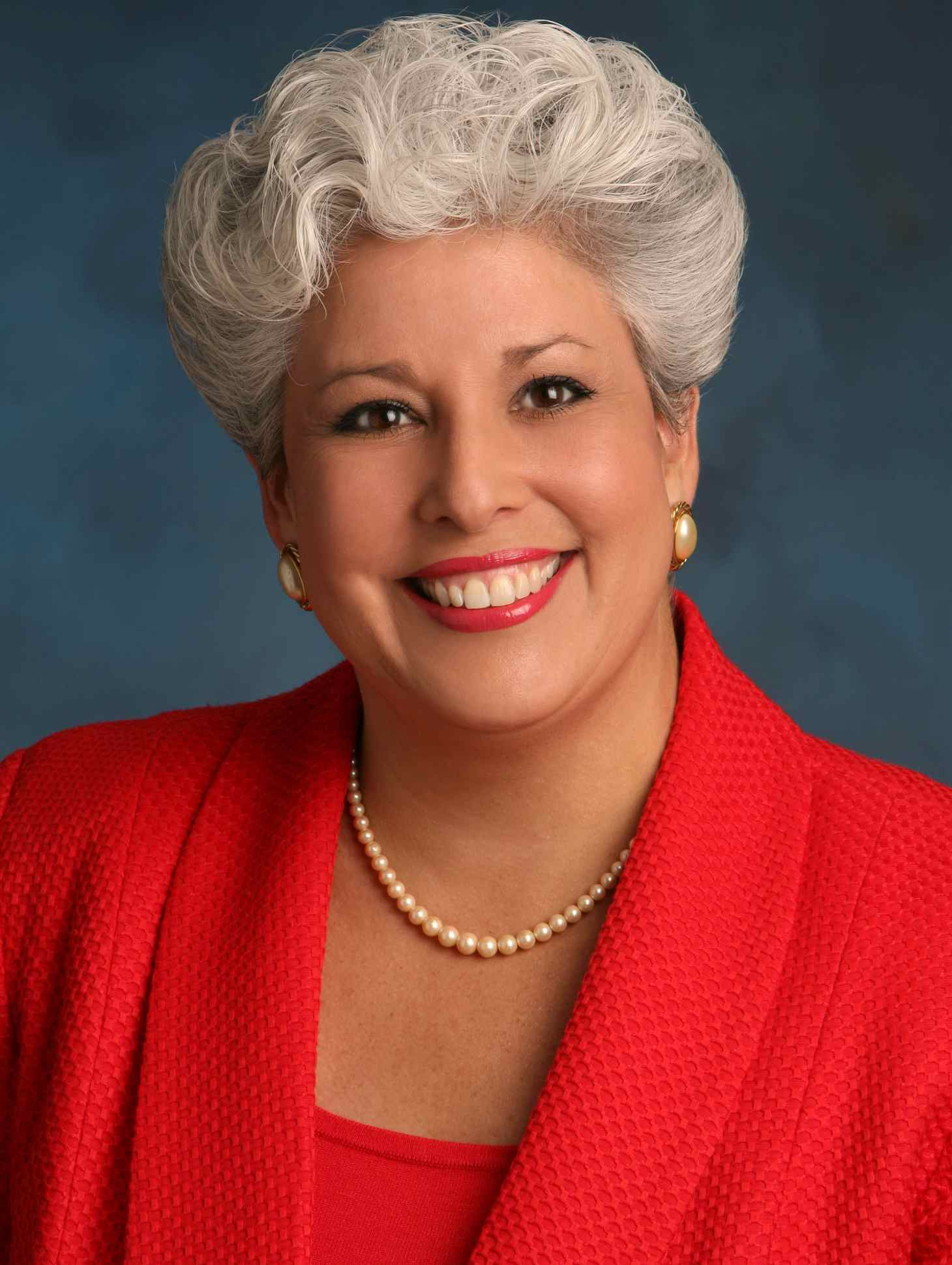

Candidate	Joe McComb	Nelda Martinez	Larry White
Party	Nonpartisan	Nonpartisan	Nonpartisan
Alliance	Republican	Democratic
Popular vote	11,112	6,445	1,518
Percentage	52.22%	30.29%	7.13%
Mayor before election
Vacant (after resignation of Dan McQueen)
Elected mayor
Joe McComb
Nonpartisan

The 2017 Corpus Christi mayoral special election was held on May 6, 2017, to elect the mayor of Corpus Christi, Texas. It was held following the resignation of Dan McQueen. It saw the election of Joe McComb.

== Results ==
Results
Candidate	Votes	%
Joe McComb	11,112	52.22
Nelda Martinez	6,445	30.29
Larry White	1,518	7.13
Mark A. Di Carlo	738	3.47
Jonathan Garison	636	2.99
James M. Henandez	385	1.81
Ray Madrigal	339	1.59
Total votes	21,280	
