= Melinda Estes =

American pathologist and CEO

Melinda L. Estes
- Other names: Dr. Estes; Mindy
- Occupations: President and CEO, Saint Luke's Health System; Board-certified Neurologist; board-certified neuropathologist
- Known for: Physician executive

Melinda L. Estes is president and CEO of Saint Luke's Health System, based in the bi-state Kansas City-metro area. Estes is a board-certified neurologist and neuropathologist. Prior to joining Saint Luke's Health System in September 2011, she was president and CEO of Fletcher Allen Health Care, based in Burlington, Vermont since October 2003.

== Education ==
Estes graduated from high school in Victoria, Texas. She holds a Bachelor of Science degree from Sam Houston State University in Huntsville, Texas, and earned her medical degree from University of Texas Medical Branch in Galveston, Texas, where she also completed a neurology residency. Estes was a neuropathology fellow at Cleveland Clinic Foundation and completed special training in pediatric neuropathology at the Children's Hospital of Philadelphia. She received a Master of Business Administration from Case Western Reserve University’s Weatherhead School of Management in 1995.

== Career ==
Estes served as Associate Chief of Staff of Cleveland Clinic Foundation from 1990 to 1997. In 1990, she became the first woman to be elected to The Cleveland Clinic's board of governors. Estes also was head of neuropathology at the Cleveland Clinic Foundation. Her research resulted in more than 100 scientific papers published.

In 1997 Estes left Cleveland Clinic Foundation to be an executive vice president and chief of staff at MetroHealth System (MHS) in Cleveland from 1997 to 2000.

In October 2000, Estes returned to the Cleveland Clinic Foundation as executive director of business development. She also was chief medical officer of Cleveland Clinic Florida from 2000 to 2001. From 2001 to September 2003, she was chief executive officer and chairperson of governors of Cleveland Clinic Florida, where she oversaw both Cleveland Clinic Naples and Cleveland Clinic Weston.

Estes moved to Burlington, Vermont in 2003 to assume the role of president and CEO of Fletcher Allen Health Care. In September 2011, she was named president and CEO of Saint Luke's Health System.

== Professional accomplishments ==
On July 25, 2018, American Hospital Association (AHA) President and CEO Rick Pollack announced Estes as the new chair-elect designate for the AHA board of trustees. A member of the board since 2015, Estes previously was on its executive committee, where she led an effort to strengthen physician engagement in the association and is on an advisory group focused on how the association engages its members. Estes served a three-year term from 2019 to 2021, during which she was chair-elect, chair, and immediate past chair.

Previously, Estes was on the board of the Council of Teaching Hospitals of the Association of American Medical Colleges, the board of directors of the University Health System Consortium, the American Hospital Association's Metropolitan Health Council, the Committee on Health Professionals, and the Regional Policy Board. She was chair of the board of the Vermont Associations of Hospitals and Health Systems and is a member of the Missouri Hospital Association.

In 2023, Estes was named in Becker's Hospital Review's "177+ women hospital presidents and CEOs to know 2023."
