= Steve Sparks (pitcher, born 1965) =

American baseball player (born 1965)

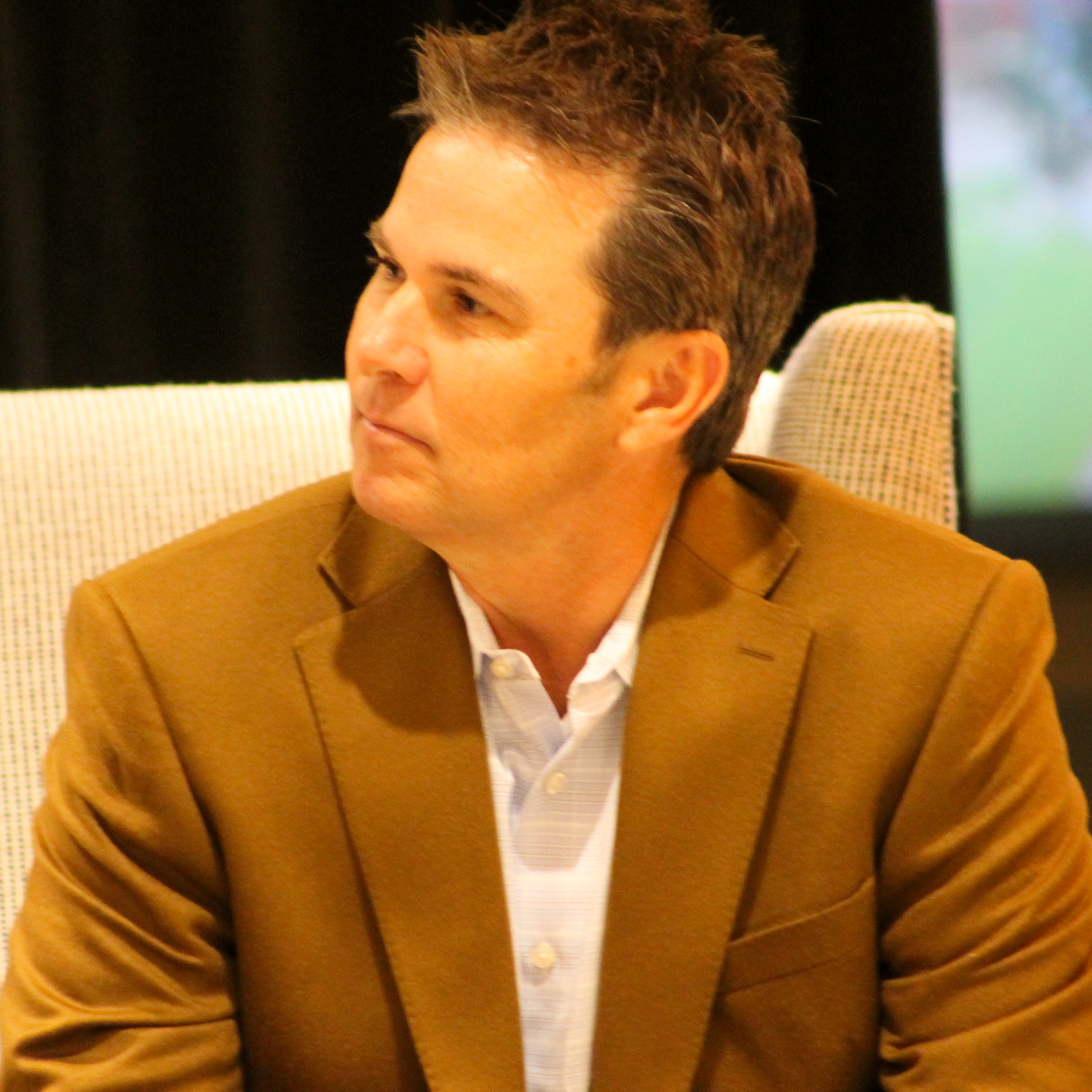
- Sparks in 2015
- Pitcher
- Born: July 2, 1965 (age 61); Tulsa, Oklahoma, U.S.
- Batted: Right Threw: Right

MLB debut
- April 28, 1995, for the Milwaukee Brewers

Last MLB appearance
- September 26, 2004, for the Arizona Diamondbacks

MLB statistics
- Win–loss record: 59–76
- Earned run average: 4.88
- Strikeouts: 658
- Stats at Baseball Reference

Teams
- Milwaukee Brewers (1995–1997); Anaheim Angels (1998–1999); Detroit Tigers (2000–2003); Oakland Athletics (2003); Arizona Diamondbacks (2004)

Steven William Sparks (born July 2, 1965) is an American former knuckleball-throwing right-handed Major League Baseball pitcher and broadcaster. A graduate from Holland Hall School, he attended Sam Houston State University in 1987. In addition to the knuckleball, Sparks threw an occasional slider and low-80s fastball.

Currently, he serves as the color commentator for the radio broadcasts of the Houston Astros, after being hired in 2013.

== Professional career ==
=== Milwaukee Brewers ===
Sparks was drafted in the 5th round by the Milwaukee Brewers. He learned to throw the knuckleball in 1991. He bounced around in the Brewers minor league system until 1995, which was when the Brewers added him to the starting rotation to begin the season. Before the 1995 season, Sparks was infamously known for having ripped a phone book and dislocating his non throwing shoulder, having kept him from making the team in 1994.

Sparks pitched in 33 games for the Brewers in 1995, also making 27 starts. He finished 9–11 with three complete games.

The following season, Sparks split time between pitching with the Brewers and pitching in AAA. He pitched in 11 games at AAA, going 2–6 with a 4.99 ERA while with the Brewers he pitched in 20 games (13 starts) and recording a record of 4–7 with a 6.60 ERA. He was beset by control issues, striking out 21 and walking 52 in 88.2 innings. He also allowed 19 home runs.

Sparks underwent Tommy John surgery in 1997. After the 1997 season, Sparks was let go by the organization, ending his 10-year run with the Brewers organization.

=== Anaheim Angels ===
In 1998, Sparks signed with the Angels while he recovered from surgery. On June 16, Sparks made his return since the end of the 1996 season, pitching 6 2/3 en route to his first win since July 1996. For the season, Sparks finished with a 9–4 record in 22 games (20 starts). In 1999, Sparks' control issues returned, prohibiting him from gaining his effectiveness from the previous year. In 26 starts, he finished with a record of 5-11 and a 5.42 ERA. He induced 82 walks while striking out 73 in 147.2 innings.

=== Detroit Tigers ===
In 2000, the Tigers signed Sparks to a minor league deal. He made four appearances with the team before getting demoted to AAA, he went 5–7 in 14 starts at the minor league level. He got called back up on July 22. He finished the season in the rotation, going 7–5.

In 2001, Sparks enjoyed the best season of his career, setting career highs in wins (14), ERA (3.65), innings (232), complete games (8) and strikeouts (116).

Sparks regressed the following year, going 8–16 in 30 starts for the Tigers and recording the highest ERA in the American League (5.52). Sparks was demoted to the bullpen in 2003 in favor of rookie pitcher Jeremy Bonderman. Sparks was let go after 42 games and signed with the Oakland A's 4 days later.

=== Oakland Athletics ===
Sparks latched on with the A's and pitched in 9 games. His record between the A's and Tigers was 0–6 in 51 games.

=== Arizona Diamondbacks ===
In 2004, the Diamondbacks signed Sparks to a one-year deal. Sparks finished 3–7 in 29 games (18 starts).

=== San Diego Padres ===
On January 25, 2005, Sparks was signed to a minor league deal with the Padres. He was injured for most of the season, only appearing in 3 starts in AAA. He was let go at mid season.

=== Oakland Athletics (second stint) ===
Sparks signed a minor league deal with the A's, making 11 starts for the AAA level.

=== Houston Astros ===
After the 2005 season, he was signed by the Houston Astros to a minor league contract, but after being cut, he retired at age 40.

== Personal life ==
Sparks lives in Houston and works as a color analyst for Houston Astros radio broadcasts.

== See also ==
- List of knuckleball pitchers
- List of Sam Houston State University alumni
