= Nelda Martinez =

American politician

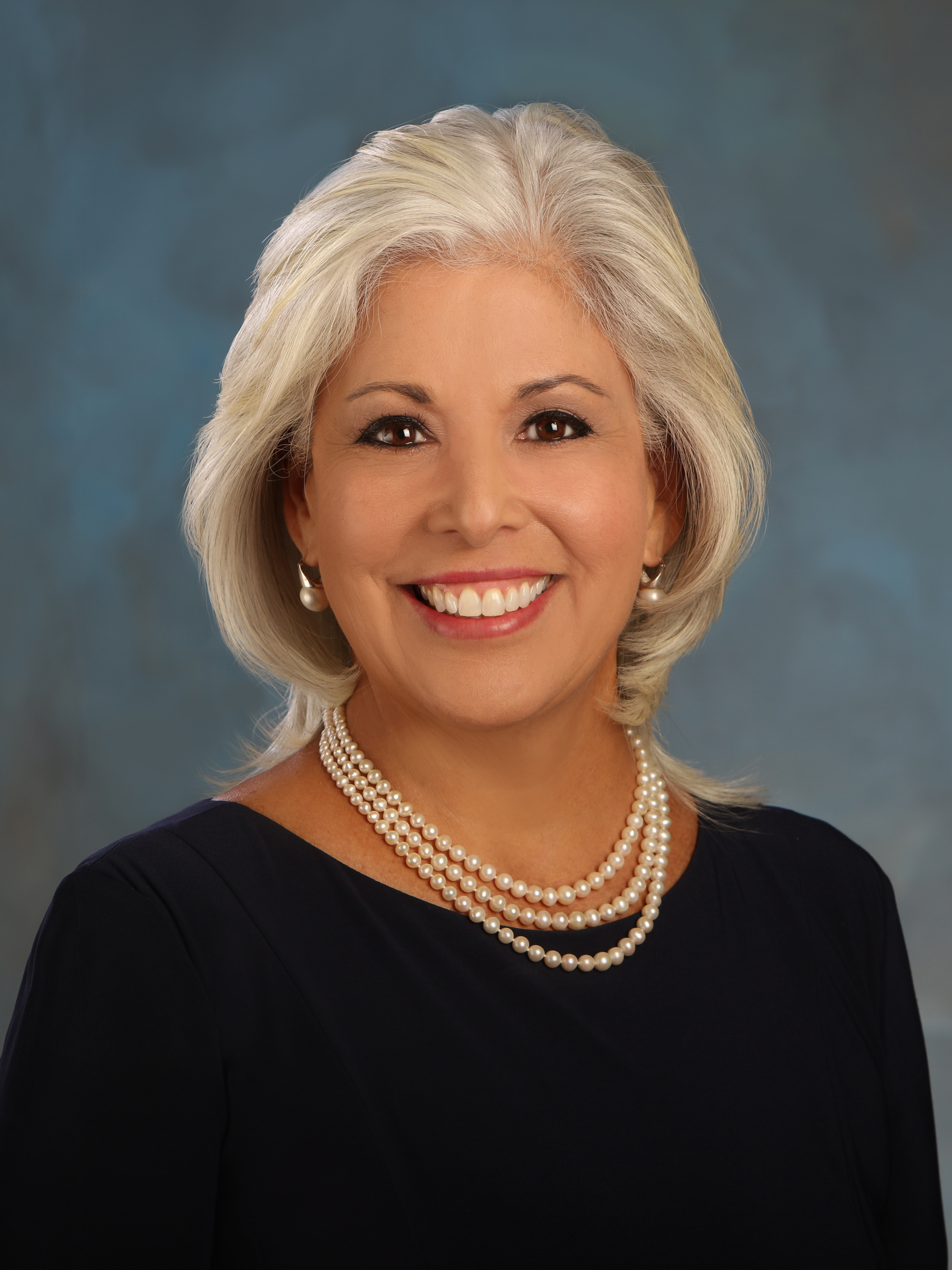
Nelda Martinez

Nelda Martinez (born July 22, 1961) is an American businesswoman and politician who served as mayor of the Texas city of Corpus Christi from 2012 to 2016. Nelda broke historical barriers in Corpus Christi city council elections becoming the first woman and first Hispanic to be the highest vote-getter in an at-large election, a feat she continued and became the first Hispanic Woman to be elected Mayor. https://txdc.org/v2/events/women-in-leadership-symposium/2015-women-in-leadership-symposium/corpus-christi/nelda-martinez/#:~:text=Nelda%20served%20as%20President%20of,Forum%20Women's%20Chapter%20honored%20Nelda Martinez is affiliated with the Democratic Party.

== Mayor of Corpus Christi, Texas ==
Nelda Martinez is a former mayor of Corpus Christi, Texas, and was the third woman to hold the position since the election of Betty Turner, the first female mayor, in 1987. She was elected in 2012. Before becoming mayor, she was an at-large member of the Corpus Christi City Council from 2007 to 2012. Martinez was reelected to a second term in 2014. Martinez announced that she would run in 2016 but lost re-election for a third and final term to Dan McQueen on November 8, 2016. After McQueen resigned from office after five weeks, Martinez announced her intent to run in the special mayoral election, formally filing on February 28, 2017. Joe McComb won the special election.

== Early life and education ==
Martinez was born in Corpus Christi, the fifth of nine children of Maria Consuelo Martinez and Roosevelt Martinez. She graduated from Corpus Christi’s Mary Carroll High School and attended Del Mar College. She has a bachelor of arts degree in government with a minor in Latin American studies from the University of Texas at Austin.

Martinez has a daughter, Amanda Rose, who she gave up for adoption shortly after birth. They were reunited 29 years later. Amanda Rose and her husband, Michael, have two daughters.

== Professional career ==
Martinez is the founder, president, and owner of Adlen Enterprises, Inc., an asset management company. She has also founded, owned and sold three other businesses, including 5102 Joint Venture, a real estate holding company; Nueces Title, and First American Closing Office, Inc. Martinez is a licensed real estate agent in the State of Texas.

== Public service career ==
Martinez served three terms as an at-large member of the Corpus Christi City Council from 2007-2012. She was the top vote-getter in each of her at-large elections. Martinez was elected mayor in 2012 with over 52 percent of the vote becoming the first Hispanic woman and the third woman to hold the position since the election of Betty Turner in 1987 and Mary Rhodes in 1991. Martinez was re-elected in 2014 with over 51 percent of the vote.

During her first term as mayor, she supported an ordinance for the first ever street maintenance fee on residents’ utility bills to help pay for city street improvements. She supported the council’s vote in 2014 to build the Mary Rhodes Pipeline Phase 2, a 42-mile, 54-inch pipeline from the Colorado River to help meet long-term regional water needs. Martinez was part of a regional team that secured funding in 2013 for replacement of the city’s aging Harbor Bridge that, in addition to being a safer design, would boost economic development by allowing larger ships to enter the Port of Corpus Christi harbor. In 2013, she supported a move to protect area military bases with the adoption of the NAS Corpus Christi Joint Land Use Study. The study identified strategies needed for greater land use compatibility surrounding three Navy training fields in Corpus Christi. In 2014, Martinez and the city council publicly opposed development of a wind energy farm in the city’s extraterritorial jurisdiction zone citing concerns that the project would stymie growth on the city’s Southside and would impact flight training operations at Naval Air Station Corpus Christi and NAS Kingsville. Martinez supported the city’s move to annex portions of the project that fell within the city’s extraterritorial jurisdiction zone as a way to stop project development. During Martinez’ second mayoral term, the city council proposed the Downtown Development Plan to revitalize Corpus Christi’s central business and entertainment district. The plan, adopted in 2018, included a re-design of the city’s major thoroughfare and downtown bayfront areas. In 2015, she supported the renewal and expansion of the Tax Increment Reinvestment Zone #3, that had been created in 2008, as a funding source for downtown development.

As mayor, Martinez sought stricter guidelines for payday and auto title loan businesses through the credit access business registration and regulation ordinance enacted in 2015. Ride share company Uber announced in March 2016 that it was leaving Corpus Christi in response to the city’s newly-enacted ordinance requiring driver fingerprint background checks. Martinez urged passage of the ordinance as a public safety concern. In July 2016, Martinez appointed Margie C. Rose as the first African-American person and first woman to hold the position of city manager. Rose, who had been serving as deputy city manager, replaced Ron Olson who had resigned in May.

After her service to the city had ended, Martinez joined Pete Buttigieg’s 2020 presidential campaign serving as a surrogate for the candidate.

== Community involvement and philanthropy ==
Martinez serves on the advisory board of the Lyndon B. Johnson School of Public Affairs Women’s Campaign School, is a lifetime member of the NAACP, and volunteered as “Madame Flutterby”, one of the Clowns Who Care at Driscoll Children's Hospital. She is a past president of the Texas Municipal League and served on the National League of Cities Transportation and Infrastructure Services Policy and Advocacy Committee, and the Gulf Coast Strategic Highway and I-69 Alliance.

A former board chair for South Texas Public Broadcasting, Inc., she led the fundraising effort for “Justice for My People,” a documentary about the life and legacy of civil rights leader Dr. Hector P. Garcia. Previous board service also includes Christus Spohn Health System Foundation, Foster Angels of South Texas, Girl Scouts of Greater South Texas, Palmer Drug Abuse Program, Coastal Bend Council of Governments, Workforce Solutions of the Coastal Bend Chief Elected Officials Council, South Texas Catholic Diocese Bishop’s Guild, Building America’s Future Education Fund, and Executive Women International Corpus Christi.

== Awards and honors ==
Martinez has received numerous awards and honors, including:

- Knight of the Honorable Order of St. Michael, Army Aviation Association of America, Inc., Corpus Christi Army Depot Chapter, 2016
- Texas Association of Mexican American Chambers of Commerce (TAMACC) Women of Distinction Award, 2015
- League of Women Voters, Corpus Christi Chapter, Trailblazers Award, 2015
- Texas Speech Communication Association Communicator of the Year, 2013
- U.S. Small Business Administration Women in Business Champion, 2007
- Hispanic Women’s Network of Texas Estrella of Texas at the 25th annual state conference
- Del Mar College Distinguished Alumni Award
- YWCA Corpus Christi Y Women in Careers Award for Corporate/Business Management, 2000
- Coastal Bend Area GI Forum Women’s Chapter “Outstanding Businesswoman of the Year,” 1999
