= Ray Benge =

American baseball player (1902–1997)

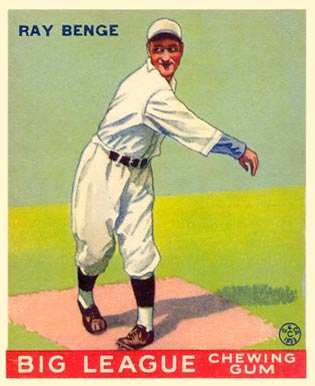
- Pitcher
- Born: April 22, 1902; Jacksonville, Texas, U.S.
- Died: June 27, 1997 (aged 95); Centerville, Texas, U.S.
- Batted: Right Threw: Right

MLB debut
- September 26, 1925, for the Cleveland Indians

Last MLB appearance
- June 2, 1938, for the Cincinnati Reds

MLB statistics
- Win–loss record: 101–130
- Earned run average: 4.52
- Strikeouts: 655
- Stats at Baseball Reference

Teams
- Cleveland Indians (1925–1926); Philadelphia Phillies (1928–1932); Brooklyn Dodgers (1933–1935); Boston Bees (1936); Philadelphia Phillies (1936); Cincinnati Reds (1938)

Raymond Adelphia Benge (April 22, 1902 – June 27, 1997) was an American pitcher for the Cleveland Indians (1925–26), Philadelphia Phillies (1928–32 and 1936), Brooklyn Dodgers (1933–35), Boston Bees (1936) and Cincinnati Reds (1938). He led the National League in home runs allowed (24) and earned runs allowed (139) in 1929.

In 12 seasons Benge had a 101–130 win–loss record, 346 games (249 started), 102 complete games, 12 shutouts, 65 games finished, 19 saves, 1,875 1/3 innings pitched, 2,177 hits allowed, 1,108 runs allowed, 941 earned runs allowed, 132 home runs allowed, 598 walks, 655 strikeouts, 30 hit batsmen, 14 wild pitches, 8,278 batters faced and a 4.52 ERA.

Benge served in the US Navy during World War II. He died in Centerville, Texas, at the age of 95.
