= Colton Cowser =

American baseball player (born 2000)

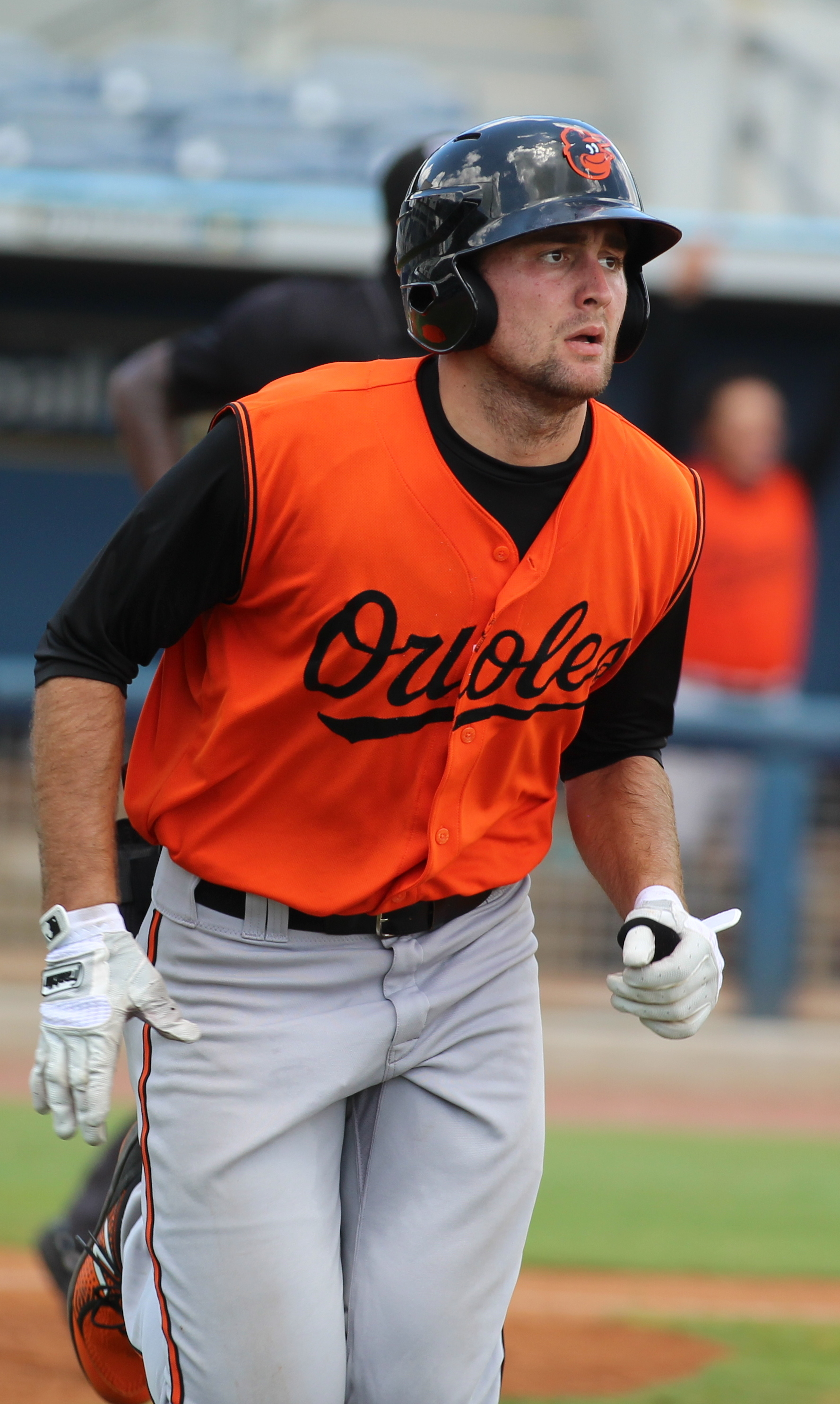
- Cowser with the FCL Orioles in 2021

Baltimore Orioles – No. 17
- Outfielder
- Born: March 20, 2000 (age 26); Houston, Texas, U.S.
- Bats: Left Throws: Right

MLB debut
- July 5, 2023, for the Baltimore Orioles

MLB statistics (through 2026 season)
- Batting average: .219
- Home runs: 53
- Runs batted in: 153
- Stats at Baseball Reference

Teams
- Baltimore Orioles (2023–present)

Colton Dale Cowser (born March 20, 2000), nicknamed “the Milkman”, is an American professional baseball outfielder for the Baltimore Orioles of Major League Baseball (MLB). He played college baseball for the Sam Houston State Bearkats and was selected by the Orioles in the first round of the 2021 MLB draft. He made his MLB debut in 2023.

== Amateur career ==
Cowser attended Cypress Ranch High School in Cypress, Texas. In 2018, his senior year, he earned all-state honors after batting .411 with 38 RBI and thirty stolen bases. He was not selected in the 2018 Major League Baseball draft and enrolled at Sam Houston State University in Huntsville, Texas to play college baseball for the Sam Houston State Bearkats.

In 2019, Cowser's freshman season at Sam Houston State, he was immediately placed into the starting lineup, and batted .361 with seven home runs, 54 runs batted in (RBI), and nine stolen bases over 56 games. He won the Southland Conference Hitter of the Year Award. He was named a Freshman All-American by multiple media outlets including Baseball America, Collegiate Baseball Newspaper, Perfect Game, and D1Baseball.com. After the season, he earned a spot on the Team USA Collegiate National Team. He was named Most Valuable Player of the 2019 USA vs Cuba Friendship Series after batting .438 with six runs. Prior to the 2020 season, Cowser was named to the Golden Spikes Award watch list alongside earning pre-season Southland Conference honors. Over 14 games for the 2020 season before the remainder of games were cancelled due to the COVID-19 pandemic, Cowser hit .255 with one home run. As a junior in 2021, he slashed .374/.490/.680 with 16 home runs and 52 RBI over 55 games. He was named the Southland Conference Player of the Year as well as being named to the All-Defensive Team.

== Professional career ==
=== Minor leagues ===
The Baltimore Orioles selected Cowser in the first round, with the fifth overall selection, of the 2021 Major League Baseball draft. He signed with the Orioles for a $4.9 million signing bonus. On August 2, 2021, Cowser made his professional debut with the Rookie-level Florida Complex League Orioles, hitting a solo home run in his second at-bat. After batting .500 over 22 at-bats, he was promoted to the Delmarva Shorebirds of the Low-A East. Over 25 games with Delmarva, Cowser batted .347 with one home run and 26 RBI.

Cowser was assigned to the Aberdeen IronBirds of the High-A South Atlantic League to begin the 2022 season. In late June, he was promoted to the Bowie Baysox of the Double-A Eastern League. In late August, he was promoted to the Norfolk Tides of the Triple-A International League. Over 138 games between the three teams, he slashed .278/.406/.469 with 19 home runs, 66 RBI, 18 stolen bases, and 36 doubles.

Opening the 2023 season, Cowser returned to Norfolk. In 56 games for the Tides, he hit .330/.459/.537 with 10 home runs and 40 RBI.

=== Major leagues ===
On July 5, 2023, Cowser was selected to the 40-man roster and promoted to the major leagues for the first time. He made his MLB debut that day in a 6–3 victory over the New York Yankees. In the 6th inning of the contest, Cowser recorded his first major league hit, an RBI single off reliever Nick Ramirez. He spent the remainder of the campaign with the Tides after being optioned for a second time on September 3 when Aaron Hicks was reinstated from the injured list. Cowser received the Most Valuable Player (MVP) Award at the Triple-A National Championship Game won by the Tides over the Oklahoma City Dodgers 7–6 on September 30. He went 2-for-4 with a two-out grand slam to center in the 7th inning. With the Orioles, he batted .115/.286/.148 with no home runs and four RBI in 61 at–bats over 26 games.

In 2024, Cowser made the Orioles' Opening Day roster. He played primarily left field alongside center field and left field. He drove in four runs in the first multi-RBI game of his MLB career in a 7–1 win over the Boston Red Sox on April 9. He had another four-RBI performance when he hit the first two home runs of his MLB career in a ten-inning 9–4 victory over the same opponent two nights later on April 11. He had a total of ten RBI during the three-game sweep of the Red Sox at Fenway Park. In 153 games for the Orioles, Cowser slashed .242/.321/.447 with 24 home runs and 69 RBI. Cowser placed second in American League Rookie of the Year voting, losing to New York Yankees starting pitcher Luis Gil by five points, the second closest vote in awards history.

On October 2, 2024, Cowser exited Game 2 of the Wild Card Series against the Kansas City Royals an inning after taking a pitch off the hand while swinging. After the game, the Orioles announced that he suffered a broken left hand. Cowser underwent successful surgery to repair the fracture on October 15. He served as the master of ceremonies of the 2025 Major League Baseball draft lottery at the Winter Meetings on December 10, 2024.

On March 31, 2025, after Baltimore's season-opening series against the Toronto Blue Jays, he was ruled out for 6-to-8 weeks with a broken left thumb. The injury occurred when he dove into first base during a close play in a game against Toronto. On June 2, he was activated off of the injured list. Cowser played left field for the Orioles before moving to center field after the trade of Cedric Mullins. Cowser played in 92 games for the Orioles and hit .196 with 16 home runs and 40 RBI.

On May 24, 2026, Cowser hit his first career walk-off home run, a three-run homer giving Baltimore a 5–3 victory in the first half of a doubleheader against the Detroit Tigers. The next day, Cowser hit another walk-off home run in the bottom of the 13th inning, a two-run shot that gave Baltimore a 9–7 win over the Tampa Bay Rays. This followed him keeping the team alive in the 12th inning with a contested head-first slide at home plate that was overturned and ruled safe. The second walk-off home run made him one of five MLB players in the last 25 years with two walk-off home runs in a three-team-game span. On August 31, Cowser ended a game against the Colorado Rockies by robbing Jake McCarthy of a walk–off home run.

== Personal life ==
Cowser and his wife, Claire, married in January 2026 in Hawaii.
