= Larry Snook =

American politician (1941–2026)

Honorable Larry Snook

Grimes County Judge
- In office January 1, 1991 – December 31, 1994
- Preceded by: Lovett T. Boggess
- Succeeded by: Ira E. "Bud" Haynie

Grimes County Commissioner Precinct 1
- In office January 1, 2000 – December 31, 2003
- Preceded by: Doug Morris
- Succeeded by: John D. Bertling

Grimes County Democratic Party Chair
- In office January 1, 2004 – December 31, 2007

Personal details
- Born: June 19, 1941 Kilgore, Texas, U.S.
- Died: January 9, 2026 (aged 84)
- Party: Democratic
- Spouse: Mary Kathryn (Viel) Snook
- Relations: Terry Dianne Snook (Sister)
- Children: Kelly Frances Snook, Dave Paul Snook, Gary Michael Snook
- Education: Sam Houston State Teachers College (now Sam Houston State University); American Technological University (now Texas A&M University-Central Texas); United States Army Command and General Staff College
- Awards: Legion of Merit; Bronze Star Medal; Meritorious Service Medal (3); Air Medal (2); Army Commendation Medal (5); Army Achievement Medal

Military service
- Allegiance: United States of America
- Branch/service: United States Army
- Years of service: 1963–1989
- Rank: Colonel
- Commands: Company D, 227th Aviation Regiment "Wagonmasters"; 213th Assault Support Helicopter Company "Black Cats"
- Battles/wars: Vietnam War

Larry Snook (June 19, 1941 – January 9, 2026) was a United States Army Colonel who served as Grimes County Judge from January 1, 1991, to December 31, 1994, and Grimes County Commissioner, Precinct 1 from January 1, 2000, to December 31, 2003.

== Early life ==
Larry Snook was born in Kilgore, Texas, on June 19, 1941, to Dave Maxie Snook and Mary Frances (Noble) Snook. Dave and Mary Snook eventually moved to Iola, Texas, where Larry was an All District football player for the Iola School Bulldogs.

== Rodeo career ==
Snook began his rodeo career in High School and continued through College and into the early part of his Army Career. He was a Member of the Professional Rodeo Cowboys Association and participated in bull riding, saddle bronc and bareback riding events.

== Military career ==
Snook was commissioned a Second Lieutenant in the Regular Army from Sam Houston State Teachers College in 1963. From 1963 to 1965 he served as a Recon Platoon Leader and Company Executive Officer in the 2nd Battalion, 8th Cavalry Regiment, which later became the 1st Squadron, 10th Cavalry Regiment in the 4th Infantry Division at Fort Lewis, Washington.

He was selected for the initial entry rotary wing aviator course in 1966. He attended flight school at Fort Wolters, Texas and Fort Rucker, Alabama (now Fort Novosel). Following flight school, he continued his military education, attending the Aviation Maintenance Officer Course at Fort Eustis, Virginia.
After the Aviation Maintenance Officer Course he shipped out to Vietnam and was assigned to the 15th Transportation Company, Aviation Maintenance and Supply serving as the Production Control officer and Shops Platoon Commander. Snook, Captain at the time, conducted numerous down aircraft recovery missions outside of his main base of operations earning him the Bronze Star Medal and two Air Medals.

In early 1968, Snook returned from Vietnam and attended the UH-1 Instructor Pilot Course and was assigned as the deputy Huey branch chief, instructing UH-1 contact course at Fort Rucker, Alabama. Snook flew over 700 instructor pilot hours teaching new pilots how to fly the UH-1 in combat.

1969 19th Assault Support Helicopter Company (CH-47), Platoon Leader, Executive Officer, Republic of Korea

1970 Eustis Transportation Corps CCC

1971 D Company, 227th Aviation (CH-47), Commander, Fort Hood (unit is now 4th Battalion, 227th Aviation Regiment)

1972 1st Cavalry Division Transportation Officer

1973 1st Cavalry Division DISCOM Security, Plans, and Operations (SPO) officer, Fort Hood

1974 XO 34th Support Battalion, Fort Hood

1975 Recruiting Command, Deputy Commander, Richmond, VA

1976 Resident CGSC

1977 Training With Industry, Petroleum Helicopters Inc., Lafayette, LA

1978 213th Assault Support Helicopter Company (CH-47) Camp Humphries, Republic of Korea

1979 Transportation School Director of the Department of Aviation trades AIT

1981 193rd Infantry Brigade, Logistics Support Command (responsible for the full SOUTHCOM AO including embassies)

1984 Inspector General Aviation Support Command (AVSCOM)/Troop Support Command (TROSCOM), St. Louis, MO

1987 AVSCOM LNO to III Corps and Fort Hood AH-64 Battalion Fielding in conjunction with the Apache Training Brigade. Personally managed damage assessment and repair of three major storm events

== Political career ==
In March 1990, months after his official retirement from the United States Army, Snook was essentially elected Grimes County Judge in his first election for any office at any level. This was the Democratic primary election and as there was no Republican candidate, he ran unopposed in the November general election.

As Precinct 1 Commissioner, Snook helped to bring about the Iola Courthouse Annex. This building provides offices for the Precinct 1 officials and a courtroom.

== Retirement and death ==
Snook officially entered retirement after his time as the Democratic Party Chairman. He enjoyed raising his donkeys and horses on his ranch.

Snook died on January 9, 2026, at the age of 84.

== Medals, badges, unit awards and ribbons ==
Legion of Merit
Bronze Star
Meritorious Service Medal (with 2 Oak Leaf Clusters)
Air Medal (with Award numeral "2")
Army Commendation Medal (with 4 Oak Leaf Clusters)
Army Achievement Medal

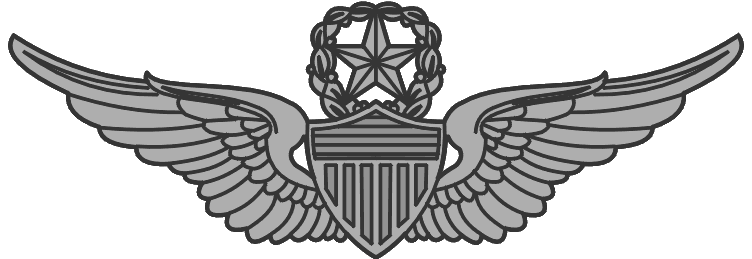
Master Army Aviator Badge
Jungle Expert Badge
