= Don Sanders Stadium =

Stadium in Huntsville, Texas, US

- "The Don"
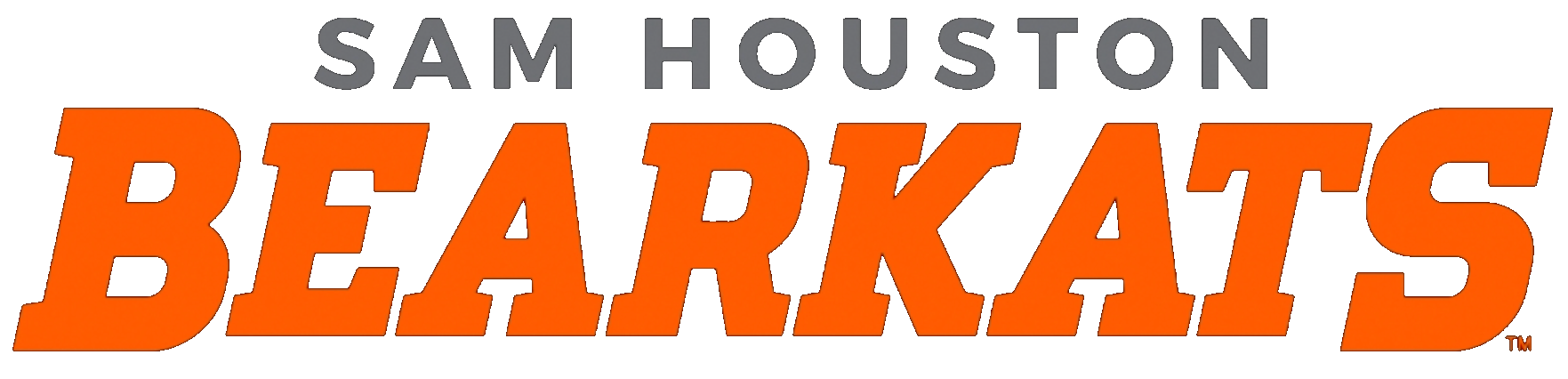

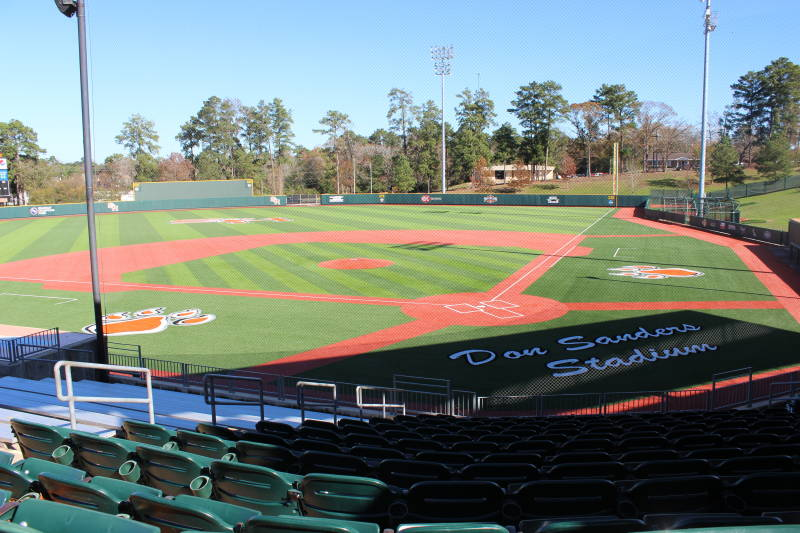
- View of the stadium in 2016
- Interactive map of Don Sanders Stadium
- Former names: Bearkat Baseball Complex
- Address: Huntsville, Tx; United States
- Coordinates: 30°42′47.2″N 95°32′24.8″W
- Operator: Sam Houston State University
- Capacity: 2,500
- Type: Ballpark
- Surface: Turf
- Record attendance: 2,815 vs Texas (February 23, 2017)
- Field size: List: Left Field Line – 330 feet (101 m) Left Center – 375 feet (114 m) Center Field – 400 feet (122 m) Right Center – 375 feet (114 m) Right Field Line – 330 feet (101 m)
- Current use: Baseball

Construction
- Opened: 2006; 20 years ago
- Renovated: 2013, 2016

Tenant
- Sam Houston Bearkats baseball (NCAA) (2006–present)

Website
- gobearkats.com/don-sanders-stadium

Don Sanders Stadium, nicknamed "The Don", is located in Huntsville, Texas, and home to the Sam Houston Bearkats baseball team. It opened on February 11, 2006. The Stadium was originally named Bearkat Baseball Complex in 2006 and in 2007 was renamed to Don Sanders Stadium. It is named after the Houston Entrepreneur Don Sanders, who donated $1 million to Sam Houston State University for enhancing the baseball program.

== Special Events ==
Don Sanders Stadium is host to many different baseball events, including many UIL games and various baseball tournaments each year.

=== CW Lighting Invitational (2006) ===
The CW Lighting Invitational in 2006 was between Dallas Baptist, Texas A&M - Corpus Christi, Southern Illinois, and host Sam Houston State. The tournament was plagued by rain as many of the games were cancelled or postponed.

=== Bearkat Classic (2008–2011) ===
Sam Houston continued to host early season tournaments beginning in 2008 with the Bearkat Classic. Sam Houston hosted this game, also called the Bearkat Invitational or Hillcrest Classic through the 2011 season. In 2011, Sam Houston State swept the tournament by going 8–0 and defeating Northern Colorado, Nebraska, Michigan and UMass twice.

=== 2008 Southland Conference Tournament ===
In 2008, Don Sanders Stadium was the host of the Southland Conference Baseball Tournament. Sam Houston State won the title winning all four games, including a victory over Lamar in the championship 15–7. The highlight of the tournament was in the semifinals, when Bearkat senior Keith Stein hit a walk-off home run in the bottom of the 9th to beat Texas A&M-Corpus Christi 7–5.

=== High School Baseball ===
UIL high school playoff games are also held at the stadium.

== Upgrades ==
=== Wall Pad installation ===
In 2012, a proposal was made by Sam Houston State University to install wall pads to the stadium's outfield fence. They were installed in time for the 2013 season.

=== New Video Board ===
On May 1, 2013, Sam Houston State alumni Don Sanders and Bud Hanley donated $240,000 towards a new video board at Don Sanders Stadium. Dimensions for the new board will be 31 feet, 10.4 inches tall by 36 feet wide with a 20 mm display.

=== Turf Installation ===
Don Sanders Stadium received a beautiful all-turf playing surface just in time for the 2016 baseball season. The outfield, infield and even the pitcher's mound all have turf surfaces. The new playing surface has been made possible thanks to donors who wish to remain anonymous on a project worth more than $1.4 million. During the 2015 season, rain affected nine out of 14 weekends during the regular season, resulting in doubleheaders having to be played due to soggy conditions. With AstroTurf being installed, lightning will be the only reason for weather related delays or cancellations of games.

== See also ==
- List of NCAA Division I baseball venues
