= Joe Adame =

American politician

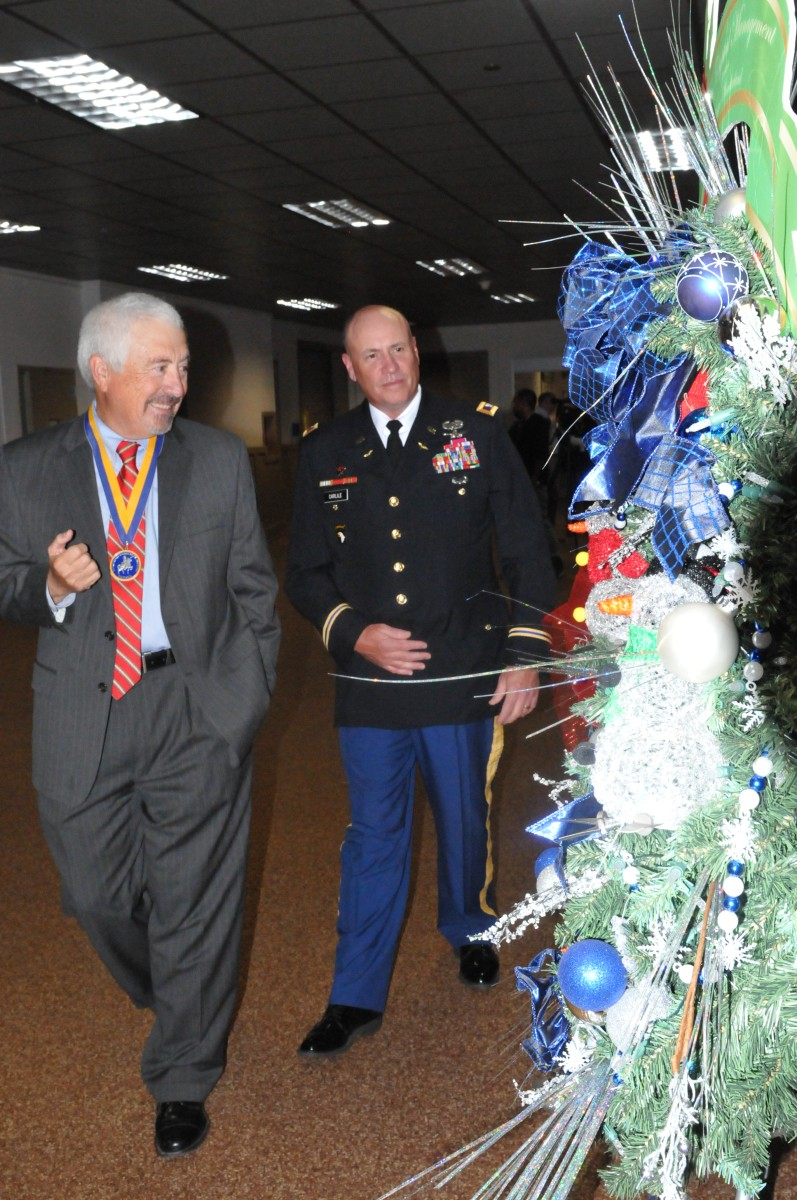
- Joe Adame (left) receiving Knight of the Special Order of St. Michael award, December 11, 2012.

Mayor of Corpus Christi, Texas
- In office 2009–2012
- Preceded by: Henry Garrett
- Succeeded by: Nelda Martinez

Personal details
- Born: October 20, 1945 (age 80) Corpus Christi, Texas
- Spouse: Kathy Ana Scogin
- Children: 3
- Profession: Real estate broker

Joseph Anthony Adame (born October 20, 1945) is an American politician and real estate broker who was the first elected Hispanic mayor of Corpus Christi, Texas, serving from May 2009 to November 2012.

== Early life and education ==
Adame was born in Corpus Christi. He graduated from Corpus Christi Academy in 1963, then attended Del Mar College in 1964. Adame graduated from Sam Houston State University in 1968 with a degree in business.

== Career ==
After college, Adame became a real estate broker and, in 1974, he founded Joe Adame & Associates, a commercial real estate firm. In 1997, Adame was appointed by the governor to the Texas Real Estate Center Advisory Committee, serving as chairman from 1997 to 2006. Adame also served as chairman of the Corpus Christi Regional Development Corporation from 1999 to 2002.

=== Mayor ===
Adame ran for mayor of Corpus Christi in 2009 "after he became frustrated with years of sluggish city growth." He received 65.58% of the vote and defeated the incumbent mayor Henry Garrett in the first defeat of an incumbent Corpus Christi mayor in 50 years. Adame won re-election to a second term in 2011, receiving 71.88% of the vote. Early in his second term, he decided not to run a third time in order to spend more time with his family. Adame's tenure as mayor was noted for several accomplishments including: an ordinance allowing residential wind turbines, demolition of the Memorial Coliseum, a stream-lined recycling program, hiring of a new city manager to balance the city budget, and approval of a $117 million tax-incentive to build a water park on Padre Island.

== Honors ==
Adame received the William Jennings Lonestar Trophy for the 1995 outstanding commercial transaction in Texas. In 2008, he was inducted into the Corpus Christi Business Hall of Fame. In 2012, Adame received the Knight of the Honorable Order of St. Michael special award from the United States Army for his support of Corpus Christi Army Depot. In 2014, Adame was named the G. Russell Kirkland Distinguished Visiting Executive by Texas A&M University–Corpus Christi.

== Personal life ==
Adame married Kathy Ana Scogin in 1971. They have three children.
