= 2021 Troy Trojans baseball team =

American college baseball team

2021 Troy Trojans baseball
- Conference: Sun Belt Conference
- East Division
- Record: 27–26 (13–11 SBC)
- Head coach: Mark Smartt (6th season)
- Assistant coaches: Shane Gierke; Matt Hancock
- Home stadium: Riddle–Pace Field

2021 Sun Belt Conference baseball standings
	Conf.				Overall
Team	W		L	PCT	W		L	PCT
East Division
South Alabama ^{x}‍‍‡‍^{y}	15	–	9	.625	36	–	22	.621
Georgia Southern ‍‍‍	14	–	10	.583	34	–	23	.596
Troy ‍‍‍	13	–	11	.542	27	–	26	.509
Appalachian State ‍‍‍	11	–	10	.524	21	–	31	.404
Georgia State ‍‍‍	12	–	12	.500	18	–	37	.327
Coastal Carolina ‍‍‍	9	–	12	.429	27	–	24	.529
West Division
Louisiana ^{x}‍‍‍	13	–	11	.542	32	–	23	.582
UT Arlington ‍‍‍	13	–	11	.542	27	–	30	.474
Louisiana–Monroe ‍‍‍	11	–	13	.458	26	–	26	.500
Little Rock ‍‍‍	11	–	13	.458	21	–	30	.412
Arkansas State ‍‍‍	10	–	14	.417	19	–	30	.388
Texas State ‍‍‍	9	–	15	.375	21	–	36	.368
x – Division champion ‡ – Tournament champion y – Invited to the NCAA tournament As of June 7, 2021; Rankings from D1Baseball

The 2021 Troy Trojans baseball team represented Troy University during the 2021 NCAA Division I baseball season. The Trojans played their home games at Riddle–Pace Field and were led by sixth-year head coach Mark Smartt. They were members of the Sun Belt Conference.

== Preseason ==
=== Signing Day Recruits ===
Player	Hometown	Previous Team
Pitchers
Dillon Cook	Huntsville, Alabama	Grissom HS
Javi Marrero	Columbus, Georgia	Pacelli HS
Keaton Fuller	Fairhope, Alabama	Fairhope HS
Dawson Hamilton	Dothan, Alabama	Dothan HS
Logan Ross	Opp, Alabama	Southern Union CC
Hitters
Michael Furry	Orlando, Florida	Lake Highland Prep
Eric Day	Oviedo, Florida	Oviedo HS

=== Sun Belt Conference Coaches Poll ===
The Sun Belt Conference Coaches Poll was released on February 15, 2021, and the Trojans were picked to finish fourth in the East Division with 44 votes.

Coaches poll (East)
Predicted finish	Team	Votes (1st place)
1	Coastal Carolina	69 (10)
2	South Alabama	51 (1)
2	Georgia Southern	51 (1)
4	Troy	44
5	Appalachian State	21
6	Georgia State	16

=== Preseason All-Sun Belt Team & Honors ===
- Aaron Funk (LR, Pitcher)
- Jordan Jackson (GASO, Pitcher)
- Conor Angel (LA, Pitcher)
- Wyatt Divis (UTA, Pitcher)
- Lance Johnson (TROY, Pitcher)
- Caleb Bartolero (TROY, Catcher)
- William Sullivan (TROY, 1st Base)
- Luke Drumheller (APP, 2nd Base)
- Drew Frederic (TROY, Shortstop)
- Cooper Weiss (CCU, 3rd Base)
- Ethan Wilson (USA, Outfielder)
- Parker Chavers (CCU, Outfielder)
- Rigsby Mosley (TROY, Outfielder)
- Eilan Merejo (GSU, Designated Hitter)
- Andrew Beesly (ULM, Utility)

== Personnel ==
=== Roster ===
2021 Troy Trojans roster
Pitchers: 10 Matt Snell - Freshman; 11 Orlando Ortiz - Junior; 13 Tyson Ellis - Sophomore; 14 Bay Witcher - Sophomore; 20 Lance Johnson - Senior; 22 Marquez Oates - Junior; 23 Max Newton - Senior; 24 Ryan Fultz - Senior; 26 Noah Janney - Freshman; 27 Davis Burgin - Sophomore; 29 Mason Kenney - Sophomore; 32 Kyle Gamble - Sophomore; 35 Ryan Pettys - Freshman; 36 DJ Wilkinson - Junior; 37 Dominick Miller - Sophomore; 42 Zach Moore - Senior; 44 Garrett Gainous - Freshman; 45 Nicholas Barber - Freshman; 46 Peyton Wesson - Freshman; 47 Grayson Stewart - Freshman; 49 Beau Fletcher - Freshman; 51 Judson Hershiser - Freshman	Catchers: 8 Caleb Bartolero - Sophomore; 38 Brady Sherrill - Junior; 40 Clay Sterns - Sophomore; 48 Logan Blackmon - Junior; Infielders: 1 Drew Frederic - Senior; 2 Jesse Hall - Junior; 4 Austin Garofalo - Junior; 6 Nic Nolan - Sophomore; 17 Easton Kirk - Junior; 18 Tanner Jackson - Sophomore; 30 William Sullivan - Freshman; 31 Donovan Whibbs - Sophomore; 33 Taylor Pridgen - Sophomore; Outfielders: 5 Reed Smith - Junior; 7 Kyle Mock - Freshman; 15 Dalton Sinquefield - Senior; 16 Logan Cerny - Sophomore; 21 Rigsby Mosley - Junior; 39 Seth Johnson - Freshman; 43 Hudson Hartsfield - Redshirt Freshman

=== Coaching staff ===
2021 Troy Trojans coaching staff
- Mark Smartt – Head Coach – 6th year
- Shane Gierke – Assistant Head Coach– 6th year
- Matt Hancock – Assistant Head Coach – 3rd year
- Peyton Fuller – Volunteer Assistant Coach – 5th year
- Adam Godwin – Director of Player Performance and Development – 3rd year
- Jackson Cofer – Director of Operations – 1st year

== Schedule and results ==
Legend
	Troy win
	Troy loss
	Postponement/Cancelation/Suspensions
**Bold**	Troy team member

2021 Troy Trojans baseball game log
Regular season (27–24)

February (7–1)
Date	Opponent	Rank	Site/stadium	Score	Win	Loss	Save	TV	Attendance	Overall record	SBC record
Feb. 19	Youngstown State		Riddle–Pace Field • Troy, AL	**W** 10-4	**Ortiz** (1–0)	Clark (0–1)	None		959	1-0	
Feb. 20	Youngstown State		Riddle–Pace Field • Troy, AL	**W** 8-2	**Gainous** (1–0)	Floyd (0–1)	**Oates** (1)		1,002	2-0	
Feb. 20	Youngstown State		Riddle–Pace Field • Troy, AL	**W** 13-6	**Witcher** (1–0)	Perry (0–1)	None		1,002	3-0	
Feb. 21	Youngstown State		Riddle–Pace Field • Troy, AL	**L** 2-4	Snyder (1–0)	**Wilkinson** (0–1)	Clift Jr. (1)		801	3-1	
Feb. 23	UAB		Riddle–Pace Field • Troy, AL	**W** 10-3	**Oates** (1–0)	Smith (0–1)	None		925	4-1	
Feb. 26	Jacksonville		Riddle–Pace Field • Troy, AL	**W** 6-3	**Ortiz** (2–0)	Santana (0–2)	**Kenney** (1)		834	5-1	
Feb. 27	Jacksonville		Riddle–Pace Field • Troy, AL	**W** 8-1	**Gainous** (2–0)	Cassala (0–1)	None		910	6-1	
Feb. 28	Jacksonville		Riddle–Pace Field • Troy, AL	**W** 9-0	**Witcher** (2–0)	Temple (0–2)	None		818	7-1	'

March (6–9)
Date	Opponent	Rank	Site/stadium	Score	Win	Loss	Save	TV	Attendance	Overall record	SBC record
Mar. 3	at Alabama		Sewell–Thomas Stadium • Tuscaloosa, AL	**L** 1-9	Shamblin (1–0)	**Gamble** (0–1)	Freeman (1)	SECN+	1,742	7-2	
Mar. 5	at Southeastern Louisiana		Pat Kenelly Diamond at Alumni Field • Hammond, LA	**L** 2-7	Bartley (1-1)	**Ortiz** (2–1)	None	ESPN+	898	7-3	
Mar. 6	at Southeastern Louisiana		Pat Kenelly Diamond at Alumni Field • Hammond, LA	**L** 1-7	Warren (2–0)	**Gainous** (2–1)	None		868	7-4	
Mar. 7	at Southeastern Louisiana		Pat Kenelly Diamond at Alumni Field • Hammond, LA	**L** 2-4	Hughes (1–0)	**Oates** (1-1)	None	ESPN+	833	7-5	
Mar. 9	Samford		Riddle–Pace Field • Troy, AL	**L** 5-6	Cupo (3–0)	**Kenney** (0–1)	Isbell (3)	ESPN+	714	7-6	
Mar. 12	Tulane		Riddle–Pace Field • Troy, AL	**L** 4-9	Olthoff (2–0)	**Gamble** (0–2)	None	ESPN+	776	7-7	
Mar. 13	Tulane		Riddle–Pace Field • Troy, AL	**W** 12-3	**Kenney** (1-1)	Benoit (0–1)	None	ESPN+	875	8-7	
Mar. 14	Tulane		Riddle–Pace Field • Troy, AL	**L** 2-14	Aldrich (1–0)	**Witcher** (2–1)	None	ESPN+	818	8-8	
Mar. 16	Alabama		Riddle–Pace Field • Troy, AL	Game Postponed							
Mar. 19	Georgia Southern		Riddle–Pace Field • Troy, AL	**L** 1-8	Owens (1–0)	**Ortiz** (2-2)	None	ESPN+	809	8-9	0–1
Mar. 20	Georgia Southern		Riddle–Pace Field • Troy, AL	**W** 11-8	**Gainous** (3–1)	Dollander (2–1)	None	ESPN+	1,057	9-9	1-1
Mar. 21	Georgia Southern		Riddle–Pace Field • Troy, AL	**W** 8-4	**Witcher** (3–1)	Johnson (1-1)	**Pettys** (1)	ESPN+	831	10-9	2–1
Mar. 24	vs. Alabama State		Montgomery Riverwalk Stadium • Montgomery, AL	**W** 16-3	**Gamble** (1–2)	Mendez (0–2)	None		1,029	11-9	
Mar. 26	UCF		Riddle–Pace Field • Troy, AL	**L** 3-6	Gordon (3–2)	**Ortiz** (2–3)	None	ESPN+	761	11-10	
Mar. 27	UCF		Riddle–Pace Field • Troy, AL	**W** 2-1	**Gainous** (4–1)	Sinclair (1–2)	**Kenney** (2)	ESPN+	1,020	12-10	
Mar. 28	UCF		Riddle–Pace Field • Troy, AL	**W** 14-12 (8 inns)	**Johnson** (1–0)	Jones (2-2)	**Oates** (2)	ESPN+	755	13-10	

April (7–10)
Date	Opponent	Rank	Site/stadium	Score	Win	Loss	Save	TV	Attendance	Overall record	SBC record
Apr. 1	at South Alabama		Eddie Stanky Field • Mobile, AL	**L** 0-6	Lee (2–1)	**Witcher** (3–2)	Smith (1)	ESPN+	787	13-11	2-2
Apr. 2	at South Alabama		Eddie Stanky Field • Mobile, AL	**L** 3-6	Boswell (2–0)	**Wilkinson** (0–2)	None	ESPN+	812	13-12	2–3
Apr. 3	at South Alabama		Eddie Stanky Field • Mobile, AL	**L** 0-8	Booker (3–0)	**Gainous** (4–2)	Dalton (2)	ESPN+	847	13-13	2–4
Apr. 6	at Samford		Joe Lee Griffin Stadium • Birmingham, AL	**L** 3-4	Isbell (2–1)	**Kenney** (1–2)	None		137	13-14	
Apr. 9	Texas State		Riddle–Pace Field • Troy, AL	**L** 2-4	Leigh (2–4)	**Ortiz** (2–4)	Stivors (5)	ESPN+	756	13-15	2–5
Apr. 10	Texas State		Riddle–Pace Field • Troy, AL	**L** 1-3	Herrmann (4–0)	**Gainous** (4–3)	Bush (1)	ESPN+	1,005	13-16	2–6
Apr. 11	Texas State		Riddle–Pace Field • Troy, AL	**W** 5-3	**Oates** (2–1)	Martinez (0–1)	**Newton** (1)	ESPN+	703	14-16	3–6
Apr. 13	at UAB		Regions Field • Birmingham, AL	**W** 12-4	**Gamble** (2-2)	Reed (0–1)	None		359	15-16	
Apr. 16	at Georgia State		Georgia State Baseball Complex • Decatur, GA	**W** 4-0	**Gainous** (5–3)	Jones (0–5)	None		214	16-16	4–6
Apr. 17	at Georgia State		Georgia State Baseball Complex • Decatur, GA	**L** 5-7	Treadway (1–4)	**Wilkinson** (0–3)	Lutz (1)		398	16-17	4–7
Apr. 18	at Georgia State		Georgia State Baseball Complex • Decatur, GA	**L** 15-17 (10 inns)	Dawson (1–2)	**Snell** (0–1)	None		401	16-18	4–8
Apr. 20	at Jacksonville State		Rudy Abbott Field • Jacksonville, AL	**L** 1-6	Luigs (2–1)	**Pettys** (0–1)	None		720	16-19	
Apr. 23	Appalachian State		Riddle–Pace Field • Troy, AL	**W** 2-0	**Gainous** (6–3)	Tuthill (2–4)	**Oates** (3)	ESPN+	843	17-19	5–8
Apr. 24	Appalachian State		Riddle–Pace Field • Troy, AL	**W** 9-4	**Ortiz** (3–4)	Cornatzer (1-1)	None	ESPN+	804	18-19	6–8
Apr. 25	Appalachian State		Riddle–Pace Field • Troy, AL	**W** 12-2 (8 inns)	**Witcher** (4–2)	Martinez (3–6)	None	ESPN+	804	19-19	7–8
Apr. 27	Jacksonville State		Riddle–Pace Field • Troy, AL	**W** 2-0	**Oates** (3–1)	Peppers (0–3)	None	ESPN+	774	20-19	
Apr. 30	at No. 20 Florida State		Mike Martin Field at Dick Howser Stadium • Tallahassee, FL	**L** 2-3	Messick (5–2)	**Gainous** (6–4)	Anderson (1)	ACCN+	1,491	20-20	

May (7–4)
Date	Opponent	Rank	Site/stadium	Score	Win	Loss	Save	TV	Attendance	Overall record	SBC record
May 1	at No. 20 Florida State		Mike Martin Field at Dick Howser Stadium • Tallahassee, FL	**W** 3-0	**Ortiz** (4-4)	Hubbart (5–3)	**Oates** (4)	ACCN+	1,687	21-20	
May 2	at No. 20 Florida State		Mike Martin Field at Dick Howser Stadium • Tallahassee, FL	**L** 2-4	Ahearn (2–1)	**Wilkinson** (0–4)	Anderson (2)	ACCN+	1,476	21-21	
May 7	at Coastal Carolina		Springs Brooks Stadium • Conway, SC	**W** 9-7	**Gainous** (7–4)	Alaska (1–2)	**Oates** (5)	ESPN+	1,000	22-21	8-8
May 8	at Coastal Carolina		Springs Brooks Stadium • Conway, SC	**W** 9-7	**Ortiz** (5–4)	Parker (3–4)	**Oates** (6)	ESPN+	1,000	23-21	9–8
May 9	at Coastal Carolina		Springs Brooks Stadium • Conway, SC	**W** 10-6	**Witcher** (5–2)	Kurki (0–1)	None	ESPN+	1,000	24-21	10–8
May 11	Alabama State		Riddle–Pace Field • Troy, AL	Game cancelled							
May 14	Arkansas State		Riddle–Pace Field • Troy, AL	**W** 12-4	**Gainous** (8–4)	Hudson (4–2)	None		834	25-21	11–8
May 15	Arkansas State		Riddle–Pace Field • Troy, AL	**W** 3-1	**Ortiz** (6–4)	Nash (3–5)	**Oates** (7)		866	26-21	12–8
May 16	Arkansas State		Riddle–Pace Field • Troy, AL	**L** 5-9	Holt (4–3)	**Witcher** (6–3)	None		816	26-22	12–9
May 20	at Louisiana		M. L. Tigue Moore Field at Russo Park • Lafayette, LA	**W** 6-5	**Gainous** (9–4)	Arrighetti (7–5)	**Oates** (8)	ESPN+	460	27-22	13–9
May 21	at Louisiana		M. L. Tigue Moore Field at Russo Park • Lafayette, LA	**L** 2-3	Cooke (7–3)	**Ortiz** (6–5)	Talley (8)	ESPN+	958	27-23	13–10
May 22	at Louisiana		M. L. Tigue Moore Field at Russo Park • Lafayette, LA	**L** 1-2	Dixon (3–0)	**Witcher** (5–4)	Schultz (4)	ESPN+	1,227	27-24	13–11

Postseason (0–2)

SBC Tournament (0–2)
Date	Opponent	Seed/Rank	Site/stadium	Score	Win	Loss	Save	TV	Attendance	Overall record	Tournament record
May 25	vs. (5W) Arkansas State	(3E)	Montgomery Riverwalk Stadium • Montgomery, AL	**L** 6-9	Stone (1–2)	**Oates** (3–2)	None	ESPN+		27-25	0–1
May 28	vs. (2W) UT Arlington	(3E)	Montgomery Riverwalk Stadium • Montgomery, AL	**L** 5-11	Seals (4–0)	**Gainous** (9–5)	None	ESPN+		27-26	0–2

Schedule source:

*Rankings are based on the team's current ranking in the D1Baseball poll.

== Postseason ==
=== Conference accolades ===
- Player of the Year: Mason McWhorter – GASO
- Pitcher of the Year: Hayden Arnold – LR
- Freshman of the Year: Garrett Gainous – TROY
- Newcomer of the Year: Drake Osborn – LA
- Coach of the Year: Mark Calvi – USA

All Conference First Team

- Connor Cooke (LA)
- Hayden Arnold (LR)
- Carlos Tavera (UTA)
- Nick Jones (GASO)
- Drake Osborn (LA)
- Robbie Young (APP)
- Luke Drumheller (APP)
- Drew Frederic (TROY)
- Ben Klutts (ARST)
- Mason McWhorter (GASO)
- Logan Cerny (TROY)
- Ethan Wilson (USA)
- Cameron Jones (GSU)
- Ben Fitzgerald (LA)

All Conference Second Team

- JoJo Booker (USA)
- Tyler Tuthill (APP)
- Jeremy Lee (USA)
- Aaron Barkley (LR)
- BT Riopelle (CCU)
- Dylan Paul (UTA)
- Travis Washburn (ULM)
- Eric Brown (CCU)
- Grant Schulz (ULM)
- Tyler Duncan (ARST)
- Parker Chavers (CCU)
- Josh Smith (GSU)
- Andrew Miller (UTA)
- Noah Ledford (GASO)

== Rankings ==
Ranking movements Legend: ██ Increase in ranking ██ Decrease in ranking — = Not ranked RV = Received votes
	Week																
Poll	Pre	1	2	3	4	5	6	7	8	9	10	11	12	13	14	15	Final
Coaches'	—	—*	—	—	—	—	—	—	—	—	—						
Baseball America	—	—	—	—	—	—	—	—	—	—	—						
Collegiate Baseball^	RV	—	—	—	—	—	—	—	—	—	—						
NCBWA†	—	—	—	—	—	—	—	—	—	—	—						
D1Baseball	—	—	—	—	—	—	—	—	—	—	—						

^ Collegiate Baseball ranked 40 teams in their preseason poll, but only ranked 30 teams weekly during the season.
† NCBWA ranks 30 teams in their preseason poll, but only ranks 25 teams weekly during the season.
* A new poll was not released for this week, so for comparison purposes, the previous week's ranking is inserted in this week's slot.
