= 2021 South Alabama Jaguars baseball team =

College baseball season

2021 South Alabama Jaguars baseball

Gainesville Regional runner-up Sun Belt Conference Tournament champions SBC Tournament Pool A champions Sun Belt Conference East Division champions
- Conference: Sun Belt Conference
- East Division
- Record: 36–22 (15–9 SBC)
- Head coach: Mark Calvi (10th season)
- Assistant coaches: Alan Luckie; Brad Phillips; Nick Magnifico
- Home stadium: Eddie Stanky Field

2021 Sun Belt Conference baseball standings
	Conf.				Overall
Team	W		L	PCT	W		L	PCT
East Division
South Alabama ^{x}‍‍‡‍^{y}	15	–	9	.625	36	–	22	.621
Georgia Southern ‍‍‍	14	–	10	.583	34	–	23	.596
Troy ‍‍‍	13	–	11	.542	27	–	26	.509
Appalachian State ‍‍‍	11	–	10	.524	21	–	31	.404
Georgia State ‍‍‍	12	–	12	.500	18	–	37	.327
Coastal Carolina ‍‍‍	9	–	12	.429	27	–	24	.529
West Division
Louisiana ^{x}‍‍‍	13	–	11	.542	32	–	23	.582
UT Arlington ‍‍‍	13	–	11	.542	27	–	30	.474
Louisiana–Monroe ‍‍‍	11	–	13	.458	26	–	26	.500
Little Rock ‍‍‍	11	–	13	.458	21	–	30	.412
Arkansas State ‍‍‍	10	–	14	.417	19	–	30	.388
Texas State ‍‍‍	9	–	15	.375	21	–	36	.368
x – Division champion ‡ – Tournament champion y – Invited to the NCAA tournament As of June 7, 2021; Rankings from D1Baseball

The 2021 South Alabama Jaguars baseball team represented the University of South Alabama during the 2021 NCAA Division I baseball season. The Jaguars played their home games at Eddie Stanky Field and were led by tenth-year head coach Mark Calvi. They were members of the Sun Belt Conference.

== Preseason ==
=== Signing Day Recruits ===
Player	Hometown	Previous Team
Pitchers
Justin Barry-Smith	The Woodlands, Texas	The Woodlands HS
Eli Copenhaver	Birmingham, Alabama	Spain Park HS
Brock Hill	Chelsea, Alabama	Chelsea HS
Eli Runyan	Bowden, Georgia	Carrollton HS
Zach Bale	Niceville, Florida	Niceville Senior HS
Hitters
Brennon McNair	Magee, Mississippi	Magee HS
Zeke Bishop	Florence, Alabama	Florence HS
Will Turner	Auburn, Alabama	Auburn HS
Joseph Sullivan	Birmingham, Alabama	Vestavia Hills HS

=== Sun Belt Conference Coaches Poll ===
The Sun Belt Conference Coaches Poll was released on February 15, 2021 and the Jaguars were picked to finish second in the East Division with 51 votes.

Coaches poll (East)
Predicted finish	Team	Votes (1st place)
1	Coastal Carolina	69 (10)
2	South Alabama	51 (1)
3	Georgia Southern	51 (1)
4	Troy	44
5	Appalachian State	21
6	Georgia State	16

=== Preseason All-Sun Belt Team & Honors ===
- Aaron Funk (LR, Pitcher)
- Jordan Jackson (GASO, Pitcher)
- Conor Angel (LA, Pitcher)
- Wyatt Divis (UTA, Pitcher)
- Lance Johnson (TROY, Pitcher)
- Caleb Bartolero (TROY, Catcher)
- William Sullivan (TROY, 1st Base)
- Luke Drumheller (APP, 2nd Base)
- Drew Frederic (TROY, Shortstop)
- Cooper Weiss (CCU, 3rd Base)
- Ethan Wilson (USA, Outfielder)
- Parker Chavers (CCU, Outfielder)
- Rigsby Mosley (TROY, Outfielder)
- Eilan Merejo (GSU, Designated Hitter)
- Andrew Beesly (ULM, Utility)

== Personnel ==
=== Roster ===
2021 South Alabama Jaguars roster
Pitchers: 11 JoJo Booker - Senior; 17 Miles Smith - Senior; 18 Tyler Samaniego - Senior; 19 Andy Arguelles - Senior; 21 Jeremy Lee - Freshman; 23 Steven Lacey - Senior; 24 Zach Harlan - Redshirt Junior; 26 Peyton Millirons - Senior; 30 Jackson Boyd - Junior; 33 Tyler Perez - Senior; 35 Jase Dalton - Senior; 37 Carson Hall - Junior; 38 Austin Mills - Freshman; 39 Noah Michael - Senior; 40 Tyler Trussell - Senior; 42 Sam Knowlton - Junior; 43 Cade Henry - Freshman; 44 Matt Boswell - Senior; 45 Tyler Lehrmann - Senior; 46 Collin Brougham - Junior; 47 Allen Roulette - Junior; 49 Michael Cauble - Freshman	Catchers: 13 Richard Sorrenti - Senior; 15 Carter Sanford - Freshman; 20 Reid Powers - Senior; 41 D. J. Law - Sophomore; Infielders: 6 Santi Montiel - Junior; 7 Noah Bailey - Junior; 8 Cameron Tissue - Junior; 9 Logan Malone - Freshman; 14 Brandon Auerbach - Junior; 16 Kaleb Delatorre - Senior; 22 Hunter Stokes - Redshirt Senior; 28 Aries Gardner - Freshman; 29 Alden Davis - Senior; 31 Tommy Van de Sanden - Junior; 50 Cameron Smith - Freshman; Outfielders: 2 Drake Dobyanski - Junior; 25 Michael Sandle - Senior; 27 Andrew Bates - Redshirt Junior; 32 Bennett Shell - Junior; 34 Ethan Wilson - Junior; 36 Bailee Hendon - Junior; Utility': 4 Hunter Donaldson - Freshman; 10 Caleb Balgaard - Redshirt Junior; 48 Harrison Ware - Freshman

=== Coaching staff ===
2021 South Alabama Jaguars coaching staff
- Mark Calvi – Head Coach – 10th year
- Alan Luckie – Assistant Head Coach – 15th year
- Brad Phillips – Assistant Head Coach – 3rd year
- Nick Magnifico – Assistant Head Coach/Recruiting Coordinator – 1st year
- Joey Jones – Director of Baseball Operations – 2nd year

== Schedule and results ==
Legend
	South Alabama win
	South Alabama loss
	Postponement/Cancelation/Suspensions
**Bold**	South Alabama team member

2021 South Alabama Jaguars baseball game log
Regular season (29-20)

February (4-3)
Date	Opponent	Rank	Site/stadium	Score	Win	Loss	Save	TV	Attendance	Overall record	SBC record
Feb. 19	Southeast Missouri State		Eddie Stanky Field • Mobile, AL	**L** 2-4	Dodd (1-0)	**Arguelles** (0-1)	None		665	0-1	
Feb. 20	Southeast Missouri State		Eddie Stanky Field • Mobile, AL	**W** 6-5	**Samaniego** (1-0)	Cisneros (0-1)	**Brougham** (1)		751	1-1	
Feb. 21	Southeast Missouri State		Eddie Stanky Field • Mobile, AL	**L** 6-8	Cisneros (1-0)	**Michael** (0-1)	None		785	1-2	
Feb. 23	Southern Miss		Eddie Stanky Field • Mobile, AL	**W** 5-3	**Lee** (0-1)	Hall (0-1)	Samaniego (1)		850	2-2	
Feb. 26	at Oral Roberts		J. L. Johnson Stadium • Tulsa, OK	**W** 7-1	**Lehrmann** (1-0)	Notary (0-1)	**Arguelles** (1)		565	3-2	
Feb. 27	at Oral Roberts		J. L. Johnson Stadium • Tulsa, OK	**W** 4-3	**Dalton** (1-0)	Scoggins (0-1)	**Samaniego** (1)			4-2	
Feb. 27	at Oral Roberts		J. L. Johnson Stadium • Tulsa, OK	**L** 2-9	Kowalski (1-0)	Millirons (0-1)	None		622	4-3	

March (9-7)
Date	Opponent	Rank	Site/stadium	Score	Win	Loss	Save	TV	Attendance	Overall record	SBC record
Mar. 3	at New Orleans		Maestri Field at Privateer Park • New Orleans, LA	**W** 5-0	**Boyd** (2-1)	Erbe (0-1)	None		195	5-3	
Mar. 5	Middle Tennessee		Eddie Stanky Field • Mobile, AL	**W** 5-4	**Dalton** (2-0)	Cheeley (0-1)	None		731	6-3	
Mar. 6	Middle Tennessee		Eddie Stanky Field • Mobile, AL	**L** 2-8	Link (1-0)	**Arguelles** (0-2)	None		687	6-4	
Mar. 7	Middle Tennessee		Eddie Stanky Field • Mobile, AL	**L** 2-4	Zoz (2-0)	**Boyd** (1-1)	Siebert (1)		598	6-5	
Mar. 9	at Alabama		Sewell–Thomas Stadium • Tuscaloosa, AL	**L** 8-11	Lee (3-0)	**Dalton** (2-1)	None		1,764	6-6	
Mar. 12	Jacksonville State		Eddie Stanky Field • Mobile, AL	**L** 2-11	Edwards (2-1)	**Lee** (1-1)	Woods (2)		684	6-7	
Mar. 13	Jacksonville State		Eddie Stanky Field • Mobile, AL	**L** 2-8	Hathcock (2-1)	**Lehrmann** (1-1)	None		751	6-8	
Mar. 14	Jacksonville State		Eddie Stanky Field • Mobile, AL	**W** 7-5	**Dalton** (3-1)	Tavel (0-1)	None			7-8	
Mar. 16	Southern Miss		Eddie Stanky Field • Mobile, AL	**W** 8-2	**Boswell** (1-0)	Boyd (1-2)	None		850	8-8	
Mar. 19	at UT Arlington		Clay Gould Ballpark • Arlington, TX	**L** 2-3	Wong (1-0)	**Dalton** (3-2)	None		314	8-9	0-1
Mar. 20	at UT Arlington		Clay Gould Ballpark • Arlington, TX	**W** 6-4	**Smith** (1-0)	Norris (1-2)	**Samaniego** (3)		314	9-9	1-1
Mar. 21	at UT Arlington		Clay Gould Ballpark • Arlington, TX	**W** 6-3	**Booker** (1-0)	Moffat (2-1)	**Dalton** (1)		314	10-9	2-1
Mar. 23	vs. Auburn		Montgomery Riverwalk Stadium • Montgomery, AL	Game Postponed							
Mar. 24	Southern		Eddie Stanky Field • Mobile, AL	Game Postponed							
Mar. 26	at Northwestern State		H. Alvin Brown–C. C. Stroud Field • Natchitoches, LA	**W** 8-6	**Smith** (2-0)	Makarewich (1-2)	None		491	11-9	
Mar. 27	at Northwestern State		H. Alvin Brown–C. C. Stroud Field • Natchitoches, LA	**W** 6-5	**Dalton** (4-2)	Davis (1-2)	**Samaniego** (4)		434	12-9	
Mar. 28	at Northwestern State		H. Alvin Brown–C. C. Stroud Field • Natchitoches, LA	**W** 12-1	**Booker** (2-0)	Graham (0-1)	None		520	13-9	
Mar. 30	at LSU		Alex Box Stadium, Skip Bertman Field • Baton Rouge, LA	**L** 1-11	Hellmers (5-1)	**Lehrmann** (1-2)	None		3,431	13-10	

April (12-3)
Date	Opponent	Rank	Site/stadium	Score	Win	Loss	Save	TV	Attendance	Overall record	SBC record
Apr. 1	Troy		Eddie Stanky Field • Mobile, AL	**W** 6-0	**Lee** (2-1)	Witcher (3-2)	**Smith** (1)		787	14-10	3-1
Apr. 2	Troy		Eddie Stanky Field • Mobile, AL	**W** 6-3	**Boswell** (2-0)	Wilkinson (0-2)	None		812	15-10	4-1
Apr. 3	Troy		Eddie Stanky Field • Mobile, AL	**W** 8-0	**Booker** (3-0)	Gainous (4-2)	**Dalton** (2)		847	16-10	5-1
Apr. 9	at Little Rock		Gary Hogan Field • Little Rock, AR	**L** 3-7	Arnold (4-3)	**Lee** (2-2)	Barkley (3)		204	16-11	5-2
Apr. 10	at Little Rock		Gary Hogan Field • Little Rock, AR	**L** 2-4	Funk (1-3)	**Boswell** (2-1)	Barkley (4)		432	16-12	5-3
Apr. 11	at Little Rock		Gary Hogan Field • Little Rock, AR	**L** 8-9	Hunt (1-1)	**Samaniego** (1-1)	None		436	16-13	5-4
Apr. 13	at Southern Miss		Pete Taylor Park • Hattiesburg, MS	**W** 4-0	**Lehrmann** (2-2)	Shepard (0-1)	None			17-13	
Apr. 18	Louisiana		Eddie Stanky Field • Mobile, AL	**W** 4-1	**Lee** (3-2)	Arrighetti (6-2)	**Smith** (2)	ESPN+	811	18-13	6-4
Apr. 19	Louisiana		Eddie Stanky Field • Mobile, AL	**W** 3-2	**Boyd** (2-1)	Talley (0-1)	**Samaniego** (5)	ESPN+	648	19-13	7-4
Apr. 19	Louisiana		Eddie Stanky Field • Mobile, AL	**W** 8-2	**Booker** (4-0)	Durke (2-3)	None	ESPN+	648	20-13	8-4
Apr. 21	Southern		Eddie Stanky Field • Mobile, AL	**W** 5-0	**Lehrmann** (3-2)	Davis (0-3)	None		814	21-13	
Apr. 23	Georgia State		Eddie Stanky Field • Mobile, AL	**W** 4-2	**Smith** (3-0)	Jones (0-6)	**Lee** (1)		839	22-13	9-4
Apr. 25	Georgia State		Eddie Stanky Field • Mobile, AL	**W** 5-1	**Boyd** (3-1)	Horton (0-2)	None		850	23-13	10-4
Apr. 25	Georgia State		Eddie Stanky Field • Mobile, AL	**W** 4-2	**Booker** (5-0)	Matela (0-6)	**Samaniego** (6)		850	24-13	11-4
Apr. 30	at Georgia Southern		J. I. Clements Stadium • Statesboro, GA	**W** 12-5	**Smith** (4-0)	Harris (1-2)	None		769	25-13	12-4

May (4–7)
Date	Opponent	Rank	Site/stadium	Score	Win	Loss	Save	TV	Attendance	Overall record	SBC record
May 1	at Georgia Southern		J. I. Clements Stadium • Statesboro, GA	**L** 2-11	Thompson (5-0)	**Boswell** (2-2)	None		673	25-14	12-5
May 2	at Georgia Southern		J. I. Clements Stadium • Statesboro, GA	**L** 6-7	Thompson (6-0)	**Dalton** (4-3)	Jones (13)		639	25-15	12-6
May 7	at Texas State		Bobcat Ballpark • San Marcos, TX	**L** 3-6	Bush (2-3)	**Samaniego** (1-2)	None		700	25-16	
May 8	at Texas State		Bobcat Ballpark • San Marcos, TX	**L** 4-13	Wood (3-4)	**Boswell** (2-3)	None		683	25-17	
May 9	at Texas State		Bobcat Ballpark • San Marcos, TX	**W** 9-4	**Dalton** (5-3)	Nicholas (0-2)	None		676	26-17	
May 14	Coastal Carolina		Eddie Stanky Field • Mobile, AL	**L** 2-4	Alaska (2-2)	**Perez** (0-1)	None		829	26-18	12-7
May 15	Coastal Carolina		Eddie Stanky Field • Mobile, AL	**W** 3-1	**Boswell** (3-3)	Kreuzer (1-1)	**Lehrmann** (1)		850	27-18	13-7
May 16	Coastal Carolina		Eddie Stanky Field • Mobile, AL	**W** 4-1	**Booker** (6-0)	Parker (3-5)	**Dalton** (3)		841	28-18	14-7
May 20	at Appalachian State		Beaver Field at Jim and Bettie Smith Stadium • Boone, NC	**L** 4-6	Roberts (1-0)	**Smith** (4-1)	Papp (1)		389	28-19	14-8
May 21	at Appalachian State		Beaver Field at Jim and Bettie Smith Stadium • Boone, NC	**L** 2-4	Ellington (3-0)	**Lehrmann** (3-3)	None		469	28-20	14-9
May 22	at Appalachian State		Beaver Field at Jim and Bettie Smith Stadium • Boone, NC	**W** 13-3	**Booker** (7-0)	Tujetsch (1-6)	None		440	29-20	15-9

Postseason (7–2)

SBC Tournament (4–0)
Date	Opponent	Seed/Rank	Site/stadium	Score	Win	Loss	Save	TV	Attendance	Overall record	Tournament record
May 26	vs. (6E) Coastal Carolina	(1E)	Montgomery Riverwalk Stadium • Montgomery, AL	**W** 14-7	**Smith** (5-1)	Kreuzer (1-2)	**Boyd** (1)	ESPN+		30-20	1-0
May 27	vs. (4W) Little Rock	(1E)	Montgomery Riverwalk Stadium • Montgomery, AL	**W** 6-2	**Michael** (5-0)	Evans (1-3)	None	ESPN+		31-20	2-0
May 29	vs. (2W) UT Arlington	(1E)	Montgomery Riverwalk Stadium • Montgomery, AL	**W** 5-4	**Samaniego** (2-2)	Wong (3-2)	**Dalton** (4)	ESPN+		32-20	3-0
May 30	vs. (2E) Georgia Southern	(1E)	Montgomery Riverwalk Stadium • Montgomery, AL	**W** 10-4	**Smith** (6-1)	Harris (2-3)	None	ESPN+	3,162	33-20	4-0

NCAA tournament (3-2)
Date	Opponent	Seed/Rank	Site/stadium	Score	Win	Loss	Save	TV	Attendance	Overall record	Tournament record
Gainesville Regionals
Jun. 4	vs. (2) Miami	(3)	Florida Ballpark • Gainesville, FL	**L** 0-1	Rosario (6-4)	**Lehrmann** (3-4)	Palmquist (14)	ACCN	2,856	33-21	0-1
Jun. 5	vs. (1)/No. 14 Florida	(3)	Florida Ballpark • Gainesville, FL	**W** 19-1	**Smith** (7-1)	Barco (10-3)	None	SECN	3,673	34-21	1-1
Jun. 6	vs. (2) Miami	(3)	Florida Ballpark • Gainesville, FL	**W** 7-2	**Booker** (8-0)	Garland (6-4)	**Samaniego** (7)	ESPN+	2,851	35-21	2-1
Jun. 6	vs. (4) South Florida	(3)	Florida Ballpark • Gainesville, FL	**W** 4-0	**Perez** (1-1)	Lord (3-4)	None	ESPN3	3,304	36-21	3-1
Jun. 7	vs. (4) South Florida	(3)	Florida Ballpark • Gainesville, FL	**L** 4-6	Kerkering (5-3)	**Arguelles** (0-3)	Sanchez (1)	ESPN3	2,526	36-22	3-2

Schedule source:

*Rankings are based on the team's current ranking in the D1Baseball poll.

== Gainesville Regional ==
Gainesville Regional Teams
(1) Florida Gators	(2) Miami Hurricanes	(3) South Alabama Jaguars	(4) South Florida Bulls

First Round
15	Florida	3
South Florida	5
South Alabama	0
Miami	1
Lower round 1
15	Florida	1
South Alabama	19

Semi-Finals
South Florida	10
Miami	2
Lower final
Miami	2
South Alabama	7

Finals
South Florida	0	6
South Alabama	4	4

== Postseason ==
=== Conference accolades ===
- Player of the Year: Mason McWhorter – GASO
- Pitcher of the Year: Hayden Arnold – LR
- Freshman of the Year: Garrett Gainous – TROY
- Newcomer of the Year: Drake Osborn – LA
- Coach of the Year: Mark Calvi – USA

All Conference First Team

- Connor Cooke (LA)
- Hayden Arnold (LR)
- Carlos Tavera (UTA)
- Nick Jones (GASO)
- Drake Osborn (LA)
- Robbie Young (APP)
- Luke Drumheller (APP)
- Drew Frederic (TROY)
- Ben Klutts (ARST)
- Mason McWhorter (GASO)
- Logan Cerny (TROY)
- Ethan Wilson (USA)
- Cameron Jones (GSU)
- Ben Fitzgerald (LA)

All Conference Second Team

- JoJo Booker (USA)
- Tyler Tuthill (APP)
- Jeremy Lee (USA)
- Aaron Barkley (LR)
- BT Riopelle (CCU)
- Dylan Paul (UTA)
- Travis Washburn (ULM)
- Eric Brown (CCU)
- Grant Schulz (ULM)
- Tyler Duncan (ARST)
- Parker Chavers (CCU)
- Josh Smith (GSU)
- Andrew Miller (UTA)
- Noah Ledford (GASO)
