= 2021 Louisiana Ragin' Cajuns baseball team =

American college baseball season

2021 Louisiana Ragin' Cajuns baseball

Sun Belt Conference West Division champions
- Conference: Sun Belt Conference
- West Division
- Record: 32–23 (13–11 SBC)
- Head coach: Matt Deggs (2nd season)
- Assistant coaches: Anthony Babineaux; Jeremy Talbert; Jake Wells
- Home stadium: M. L. Tigue Moore Field at Russo Park

2021 Sun Belt Conference baseball standings
	Conf.				Overall
Team	W		L	PCT	W		L	PCT
East Division
South Alabama ^{x}‍‍‡‍^{y}	15	–	9	.625	36	–	22	.621
Georgia Southern ‍‍‍	14	–	10	.583	34	–	23	.596
Troy ‍‍‍	13	–	11	.542	27	–	26	.509
Appalachian State ‍‍‍	11	–	10	.524	21	–	31	.404
Georgia State ‍‍‍	12	–	12	.500	18	–	37	.327
Coastal Carolina ‍‍‍	9	–	12	.429	27	–	24	.529
West Division
Louisiana ^{x}‍‍‍	13	–	11	.542	32	–	23	.582
UT Arlington ‍‍‍	13	–	11	.542	27	–	30	.474
Louisiana–Monroe ‍‍‍	11	–	13	.458	26	–	26	.500
Little Rock ‍‍‍	11	–	13	.458	21	–	30	.412
Arkansas State ‍‍‍	10	–	14	.417	19	–	30	.388
Texas State ‍‍‍	9	–	15	.375	21	–	36	.368
x – Division champion ‡ – Tournament champion y – Invited to the NCAA tournament As of June 7, 2021; Rankings from D1Baseball

The 2021 Louisiana Ragin' Cajuns baseball team represented the University of Louisiana at Lafayette during the 2021 NCAA Division I baseball season. The Ragin' Cajuns played their home games at M. L. Tigue Moore Field at Russo Park and were led by second–year head coach Matt Deggs. They were members of the Sun Belt Conference.

== Previous season ==
On March 12, 2020, the Sun Belt Conference announced the indefinite suspension of all spring athletics, including baseball, due to the increasing risk of the COVID-19 pandemic. On March 13, Louisiana governor John Bel Edwards signed an executive order banning gatherings of over 250 people until as early as April 18, thus ending all possible future 2020 home or in-state games until that time if the season were to continue. Soon after, the Sun Belt cancelled all season and postseason play.

== Preseason ==
=== Signing-day recruits ===
Player	Hometown	Previous Team
Pitchers
Bo Bonds	Suwannee, Florida	Chipola College
Cole Elkins	Fort Wayne, Indiana	Homestead HS
Adam Guth	Lake Charles, Louisiana	Barbe HS
Antoine Harris	Chalmette, Louisiana	Mississippi Gulf Coast CC
Tommy Ray	Quincy, Illinois	John A. Logan
Tony Rossi	Sanford, Florida	State College of Florida
Dylan Theut	Fulshear, Texas	Blinn College
Peyton Zabel	Pierre, South Dakota	Iowa Western CC
Hitters
Jack Clark	Whitehouse, Texas	Whitehouse HS
Kyle DeBarge	Lake Charles, Louisiana	Barbe HS
Clint Lasiter	Benton, Louisiana	Benton HS
Mason Zambo	Baton Rouge, Louisiana	Catholic HS

=== Sun Belt Conference Coaches Poll ===
The Sun Belt Conference Coaches Poll was released on February 15, 2021 and the Cajuns were picked to finish third in the West Division and fourth overall in the conference.

Coaches poll (West)
Predicted finish	Team	Votes (1st place)
1	Texas State	65 (6)
2	UT Arlington	58 (4)
3	Louisiana	52 (2)
4	Little Rock	33
5	Louisiana–Monroe	27
6	Arkansas State	13

=== Preseason All-Sun Belt Team & Honors ===
- Aaron Funk (LR, Pitcher)
- Jordan Jackson (GASO, Pitcher)
- Conor Angel (LA, Pitcher)
- Wyatt Divis (UTA, Pitcher)
- Lance Johnson (TROY, Pitcher)
- Caleb Bartolero (TROY, Catcher)
- William Sullivan (TROY, 1st Base)
- Luke Drumheller (APP, 2nd Base)
- Drew Frederic (TROY, Shortstop)
- Cooper Weiss (CCU, 3rd Base)
- Ethan Wilson (USA, Outfielder)
- Parker Chavers (CCU, Outfielder)
- Rigsby Mosley (TROY, Outfielder)
- Eilan Merejo (GSU, Designated Hitter)
- Andrew Beesly (ULM, Utility)

== Roster ==
2021 Louisiana Ragin' Cajuns roster
Pitchers: 2 Connor Cooke – Sophomore; 15 Jacob Schultz – Junior; 16 Austin Bradford – Senior; 17 Conor Angel – Junior; 27 Austin Perrin – Junior; 30 David Christie – Freshman; 31 Conner Wyly – Sophomore; 32 Spencer Arrighetti – Sophomore; 34 Hayden Durke – Freshman; 35 Blake Marshall – Sophomore; 37 Dane Dixon – Redshirt Junior; 38 Jason Nelson – Junior; 40 Will Moriarty – Redshirt Sophomore; 41 Chipper Menard – Freshman; 45 Jack Burk – Senior; 49 Peyton Havard – Freshman; 51 Jeff Wilson – Junior; 53 Carter Robinson – Junior	Catchers: 6 Nick Hagedorn – Junior; 11 Julian Brock – Freshman; 13 Drake Osborn – Senior; Infielders: 1 Brett Borgogno – Junior; 5 Sam Bianco – Freshman; 7 Kevin Fitzgerald – Sophomore; 9 Bobby Lada – Sophomore; 12 Sam Riola – Sophomore; 18 Anthony Catalano – Sophomore; 19 Clayton Dean – Freshman; 24 Josh Cofield – Sophomore; 26 Jonathan Brandon – Redshirt Junior	Outfielders: 4 Brennan Breaux – Senior; 10 Alex Hannie – Redshirt Sophomore; 14 Jamey Richey – Sophomore; 20 Tyler Robertson – Sophomore; 21 Connor Kimple – Junior; 22 Carson Roccaforte – Freshman; 33 Conor Higgs – Freshman; Utility: 8 Ben Fitzgerald – Junior; 44 CJ Willis – Sophomore

=== Coaching staff ===
2021 Louisiana Ragin' Cajuns coaching staff
- Matt Deggs – Head coach & Pitching Coach – 2nd year
- Anthony Babineaux – Associate head coach and Director of Player and Program Development– 27th year
- Jeremy Talbot – Assistant head coach – 7th year
- Jake Wells – Assistant head coach, Batting coach – 3rd year
- B. J. Ryan – Volunteer assistant Coach – 2nd year
- Chris Domingue – Academic & Camp coordinator – 18th year
- James Lang – Assistant director of Athletic Performance for Olympic Sports – 2nd year
- Joey Bearb – Clubhouse Manager
- Carter Munchrath – Clubhouse Manager
- Zackary Crain – Clubhouse Manager
- Aidan Serio – Clubhouse Manager
- Austin Belaire – Field Manager
- Victoria Stringer – Student assistant

== Schedule and results ==
Legend
	Louisiana win
	Louisiana loss
	Postponement/Cancelation/Suspensions
**Bold**	Louisiana team member

2021 Louisiana Ragin' Cajuns baseball game log
Regular season (30-22)

February (6-2)
Date	Opponent	Rank	Site/stadium	Score	Win	Loss	Save	TV	Attendance	Overall record	SBC record
Feb. 19	at Tulane		Greer Field at Turchin Stadium • New Orleans, LA	**L** 2-3 (10 inn.)	Price (1-0)	**Wilson** (0-1)	None	ESPN+	339	1-0	
Feb. 20	at Tulane		Greer Field at Turchin Stadium • New Orleans, LA	**W** 9-8 (10 inn)	**Dixon** (1-0)	Campbell (0-1)	**Talley** (1)	ESPN+	362	1-1	
Feb. 21	at Tulane		Greer Field at Turchin Stadium • New Orleans, LA	**W** 9-7 (12 inn)	**Burk** (1-0)	Price (1-1)	None	ESPN+	369	2-1	
Feb. 23	Louisiana Tech		M. L. Tigue Moore Field at Russo Park • Lafayette, LA	**W** 2-0	**Arrighetti** (1-0)	Whorff (0-1)	**Talley** (2)	ESPN+	795	3-1	
Feb. 24	No. 11 LSU		M. L. Tigue Moore Field at Russo Park • Lafayette, LA	**L** 2-11	Hellmers (1-0)	**Cooke** (0-2)	None	ESPN+	1,183	3-2	
Feb. 26	Rice		M. L. Tigue Moore Field at Russo Park • Lafayette, LA	**W** 7-3	**Durke** (1-0)	Holcomb (0-1)	None	ESPN+	890	4-2	
Feb. 27	Rice		M. L. Tigue Moore Field at Russo Park • Lafayette, LA	**W** 5-3	**Nelson** (1-0)	Brogdon (0-1)	**Arrighetti** (1)	ESPN+	911	5-2	
Feb. 28	Rice		M. L. Tigue Moore Field at Russo Park • Lafayette, LA	**W** 6-3	**Robinson** (1-0)	Deskins (0-1)	**Schultz** (1)	ESPN+	761	6-2	

March (8-9)
Date	Opponent	Rank	Site/stadium	Score	Win	Loss	Save	TV	Attendance	Overall record	SBC record
Mar. 2	at Louisiana Tech		J. C. Love Field at Pat Patterson Park • Ruston, LA	**W** 7-2	**Cooke** (1-2)	Griffen (0-1)	None		387	7-2	
Mar. 3	at McNeese State		Joe Miller Ballpark • Lake Charles, LA	**L** 3-4	Duplechain (1-0)	**Moriarty** (0-1)	Reeves (1)		402	7-3	
Mar. 5	Houston Baptist		M. L. Tigue Moore Field at Russo Park • Lafayette, LA	**W** 5-2	**Durke** (2-0)	Zarella (0-2)	None	ESPN+	737	8-3	
Mar. 6	Houston Baptist		M. L. Tigue Moore Field at Russo Park • Lafayette, LA	**W** 4-1	**Arrighetti** (2-0)	Coats (0-2)	**Schultz** (2)	ESPN+	610	9-3	
Mar. 7	Houston Baptist		M. L. Tigue Moore Field at Russo Park • Lafayette, LA	**L** 4-6 (11 inns)	Reitmeyer (1-1)	**Angel** (0-1)	Burch (1)	ESPN+	735	9-4	
Mar. 10	at No. 3 Mississippi State		Dudy Noble Field, Polk–DeMent Stadium • Starkville, MS	**L** 0-4	Harding (2-1)	**Perrin** (0-1)	None	SECN+	2,976	9-5	
Mar. 12	at Southern Miss		Pete Taylor Park • Hattiesburg, MS	**L** 4-13	Stanley (2-1)	**Durke** (2-1)	None	CUSA.TV		9-6	
Mar. 13	at Southern Miss		Pete Taylor Park • Hattiesburg, MS	**L** 0-1	Powell (2-0)	**Arrighetti** (2-1)	Ramsey (4)	CUSA.TV		9-7	
Mar. 14	at Southern Miss		Pete Taylor Park • Hattiesburg, MS	**L** 3-6 (11 inns)	Hall (1-1)	**Schultz** (0-1)	None	CUSA.TV		9-8	
Mar. 16	at Nicholls		Ben Meyer Diamond at Ray E. Didier Field • Thibodaux, LA	**W** 9-8	**Cooke** (2-2)	Theriot (2-2)	**Bradford** (1)		733	10-8	
Mar. 19	No. 15 TCU		M. L. Tigue Moore Field at Russo Park • Lafayette, LA	**W** 7-2	**Arrighetti** (3-1)	Smith (3-1)	None	ESPN+	918	11-8	
Mar. 20	No. 15 TCU		M. L. Tigue Moore Field at Russo Park • Lafayette, LA	**L** 4-13	Krob (2-0)	**Durke** (2-2)	None	ESPN+	902	11-9	
Mar. 21	No. 15 TCU		M. L. Tigue Moore Field at Russo Park • Lafayette, LA	**L** 1-5	Ray (1-1)	**Robinson** (1-1)	Green (3)	ESPN+	894	11-10	
Mar. 26	Coastal Carolina		M. L. Tigue Moore Field at Russo Park • Lafayette, LA	**W** 9-2	**Arrighetti** (4-1)	VanScoter (2-1)	None	ESPN+	1,004	12-10	1-0
Mar. 27	Coastal Carolina		M. L. Tigue Moore Field at Russo Park • Lafayette, LA	**L** 3-5	Parker (2-1)	**Menard** (0-1)	Barrow (1)	ESPN+	828	12-11	1-1
Mar. 28	Coastal Carolina		M. L. Tigue Moore Field at Russo Park • Lafayette, LA	**W** 5-3	**Perrin** (1-1)	Hopwood (4-1)	**Cooke** (1)	ESPN+	730	13-11	2-1
Mar. 29	Coastal Carolina		M. L. Tigue Moore Field at Russo Park • Lafayette, LA	**W** 7-0	**Burk** (2-0)	Green (0-1)	None		418	14-11	

April (8-8)
Date	Opponent	Rank	Site/stadium	Score	Win	Loss	Save	TV	Attendance	Overall record	SBC record
Apr. 1	at Louisiana–Monroe		Warhawk Field • Monroe, LA	**W** 9-5	**Arrighetti** (5-1)	Barnes (1-2)	None	ESPN+	694	15-11	3-1
Apr. 2	at Louisiana–Monroe		Warhawk Field • Monroe, LA	**W** 5-2	**Cooke** (3-2)	Barlow (3-3)	**Talley** (4)	ESPN+	676	16-11	4-1
Apr. 3	at Louisiana–Monroe		Warhawk Field • Monroe, LA	**W** 11-9	**Christie** (1-0)	Lindsay (1-2)	None	ESPN+	617	17-11	5-1
Apr. 6	Nicholls		M. L. Tigue Moore Field at Russo Park • Lafayette, LA	**W** 3-2	**Menard** (1-1)	Kilcrease (2-3)	**Durke** (1)		815	18-11	
Apr. 9	Arkansas State		M. L. Tigue Moore Field at Russo Park • Lafayette, LA	**W** 10-3	**Arrighetti** (6-1)	Jeans (1-1)	**Talley** (5)	ESPN+	900	19-11	6-1
Apr. 10	Arkansas State		M. L. Tigue Moore Field at Russo Park • Lafayette, LA	**W** 9-0	**Cooke** (4-2)	Nash (1-3)	None	ESPN+	851	20-11	7-1
Apr. 11	Arkansas State		M. L. Tigue Moore Field at Russo Park • Lafayette, LA	**L** 11-16	Jumper (1-2)	**Christie** (1-1)	Stone (3)		782	20-12	7-2
Apr. 18	at South Alabama		Eddie Stanky Field • Mobile, AL	**L** 1-4	Lee (3-2)	**Arrighetti** (6-2)	Smith (2)	ESPN+	811	20-13	7-3
Apr. 19	at South Alabama		Eddie Stanky Field • Mobile, AL	**L** 2-3	Boyd (2-1)	**Talley** (0-1)	Samaniego (5)	ESPN+		20-14	7-4
Apr. 19	at South Alabama		Eddie Stanky Field • Mobile, AL	**L** 2-8	Booker (4-0)	**Durke** (2-3)	None	ESPN+	648	20-15	7-5
Apr. 21	McNeese State		M. L. Tigue Moore Field at Russo Park • Lafayette, LA	**W** 4-3	**Burk** (4-0)	Abraham (2-1)	**Schultz** (3)	ESPN+	643	21-15	
Apr. 23	at Little Rock		Gary Hogan Field • Little Rock, AR	**L** 2-8	Arnold (6-3)	**Arrighetti** (6-3)	Barkley (6)	ESPN+	256	21-16	7-6
Apr. 24	at Little Rock		Gary Hogan Field • Little Rock, AR	**L** 3-4 (10 inns)	Delgadillo (2-0)	**Nelson** (1-1)	None	ESPN+	490	21-17	7-7
Apr. 25	at Little Rock		Gary Hogan Field • Little Rock, AR	**W** 7-4	**Dixon** (2-0)	Wallner (0-1)	**Talley** (5)	ESPN+	390	22-17	8-7
Apr. 27	Louisiana–Monroe		M. L. Tigue Moore Field at Russo Park • Lafayette, LA	**L** 6-7	Longsworth (1-2)	**Christie** (1-2)	Wepf (3)		567	22-18	
Apr. 30	Texas State		M. L. Tigue Moore Field at Russo Park • Lafayette, LA	**L** 3-9	Leigh (4-5)	**Arrighetti** (6-4)	None	ESPN+	887	22-19	8-8

May (8–3)
Date	Opponent	Rank	Site/stadium	Score	Win	Loss	Save	TV	Attendance	Overall record	SBC record
May 1	Texas State		M. L. Tigue Moore Field at Russo Park • Lafayette, LA	**W** 9-0	**Cooke** (5-2)	Wood (2-4)	None		826	23-19	9-8
May 2	Texas State		M. L. Tigue Moore Field at Russo Park • Lafayette, LA	**L** 2-6	Wofford (3-1)	**Perrin** (1-2)	None		426	23-20	9-9
May 7	North Alabama		M. L. Tigue Moore Field at Russo Park • Lafayette, LA	**W** 11-1	**Arrighetti** (7-4)	Davidson (2-6)	None	ESPN+	563	24-20	
May 8	North Alabama		M. L. Tigue Moore Field at Russo Park • Lafayette, LA	**W** 5-2	**Cooke** (6-2)	Best (1-9)	**Menard** (1)	ESPN+	539	25-20	
May 9	North Alabama		M. L. Tigue Moore Field at Russo Park • Lafayette, LA	**W** 13-3	**Burk** (4-0)	Haberstock (1-4)	None	ESPN+	461	26-20	
May 11	Southern		M. L. Tigue Moore Field at Russo Park • Lafayette, LA	Game cancelled							
May 14	at UT Arlington		Clay Gould Ballpark • Arlington, TX	**W** 4-3 (15 inns)	**Marshall** (1-0)	Brooks (0-2)	**Dixon** (1)	ESPN+	314	27-20	10-9
May 15	at UT Arlington		Clay Gould Ballpark • Arlington, TX	**L** 2-6	Bullard (7-3)	**Cooke** (6-3)	King (3)	ESPN+	314	27-21	10-10
May 16	UT Arlington		Clay Gould Ballpark • Arlington, TX	**W** 7-4	**Marshall** (2-0)	Logan (1-2)	**Talley** (7)	ESPN+	314	28-21	11-10
May 18	at New Orleans		Maestri Field at Privateer Park • New Orleans, LA	Game cancelled							
May 20	Troy		M. L. Tigue Moore Field at Russo Park • Lafayette, LA	**L** 5-6	Gainous (9-4)	**Arrighetti** (7-5)	Oates (8)	ESPN+	460	28-22	11-11
May 21	Troy		M. L. Tigue Moore Field at Russo Park • Lafayette, LA	**W** 3-2	**Cooke** (7-3)	Ortiz (6-5)	**Talley** (8)	ESPN+	958	29-22	12-11
May 22	Troy		M. L. Tigue Moore Field at Russo Park • Lafayette, LA	**W** 2-1	**Dixon** (3-0)	Witcher (5-4)	**Schultz** (4)		1,227	30-22	13-11

Post-season (2–1)

SBC Tournament (2–1)
Date	Opponent	Seed/Rank	Site/stadium	Score	Win	Loss	Save	TV	Attendance	Overall record	Tournament record
May 26	vs. (6W) Texas State	(1W)	Montgomery Riverwalk Stadium • Montgomery, AL	**W** 12-6	**Burk** (5-0)	Sundgren (0-4)	None	ESPN+		31-22	1-0
May 26	vs. (4E) Appalachian State	(1W)	Montgomery Riverwalk Stadium • Montgomery, AL	**W** 7-2	**Talley** (1-1)	Tuthill (4-6)	**Arrighetti** (2)	ESPN+		32-22	2-0
May 29	vs. (2E) Georgia Southern	(1W)	Montgomery Riverwalk Stadium • Montgomery, AL	**L** 2-3 (11 inns)	Thompson (7-1)	**Arrighetti** (8-6)	None	ESPN+		32-23	2-1

Schedule source:

*Rankings are based on the team's current ranking in the D1Baseball poll.

== Postseason ==
=== Conference accolades ===
- Player of the Year: Mason McWhorter – GASO
- Pitcher of the Year: Hayden Arnold – LR
- Freshman of the Year: Garrett Gainous – TROY
- Newcomer of the Year: Drake Osborn – LA
- Coach of the Year: Mark Calvi – USA

All Conference First Team

- Connor Cooke (LA)
- Hayden Arnold (LR)
- Carlos Tavera (UTA)
- Nick Jones (GASO)
- Drake Osborn (LA)
- Robbie Young (APP)
- Luke Drumheller (APP)
- Drew Frederic (TROY)
- Ben Klutts (ARST)
- Mason McWhorter (GASO)
- Logan Cerny (TROY)
- Ethan Wilson (USA)
- Cameron Jones (GSU)
- Ben Fitzgerald (LA)

All Conference Second Team

- JoJo Booker (USA)
- Tyler Tuthill (APP)
- Jeremy Lee (USA)
- Aaron Barkley (LR)
- BT Riopelle (CCU)
- Dylan Paul (UTA)
- Travis Washburn (ULM)
- Eric Brown (CCU)
- Grant Schulz (ULM)
- Tyler Duncan (ARST)
- Parker Chavers (CCU)
- Josh Smith (GSU)
- Andrew Miller (UTA)
- Noah Ledford (GASO)

== Rankings ==
Ranking movements Legend: ██ Increase in ranking ██ Decrease in ranking — = Not ranked RV = Received votes
	Week																
Poll	Pre	1	2	3	4	5	6	7	8	9	10	11	12	13	14	15	Final
Coaches'	—	—*	RV	RV	—	—	—	—	—	—	—	—	—				
Baseball America	—	—	—	—	—	—	—	—	—	—	—	—	—				
Collegiate Baseball^	RV	—	—	—	—	—	—	—	—	—	—	—	—				
NCBWA†	RV	RV	RV	RV	—	—	—	RV	RV	RV	—	—	—				
D1Baseball	—	—	—	—	—	—	—	—	—	—	—	—	—				

^ Collegiate Baseball ranked 40 teams in their preseason poll, but only ranked 30 teams weekly during the season.
† NCBWA ranks 30 teams in their preseason poll, but only ranks 25 teams weekly during the season.
* A new poll was not released for this week, so for comparison purposes, the previous week's ranking is inserted in this week's slot.
