= 2021 Georgia State Panthers baseball team =

American college baseball season

2021 Georgia State Panthers baseball
- Conference: Sun Belt Conference
- East Division
- Record: 18–37 (12–12 SBC)
- Head coach: Brad Stromdahl (2nd season)
- Assistant coaches: Matt Taylor; Dalton Martinez
- Home stadium: Georgia State Baseball Complex

2021 Sun Belt Conference baseball standings
	Conf.				Overall
Team	W		L	PCT	W		L	PCT
East Division
South Alabama ^{x}‍‍‡‍^{y}	15	–	9	.625	36	–	22	.621
Georgia Southern ‍‍‍	14	–	10	.583	34	–	23	.596
Troy ‍‍‍	13	–	11	.542	27	–	26	.509
Appalachian State ‍‍‍	11	–	10	.524	21	–	31	.404
Georgia State ‍‍‍	12	–	12	.500	18	–	37	.327
Coastal Carolina ‍‍‍	9	–	12	.429	27	–	24	.529
West Division
Louisiana ^{x}‍‍‍	13	–	11	.542	32	–	23	.582
UT Arlington ‍‍‍	13	–	11	.542	27	–	30	.474
Louisiana–Monroe ‍‍‍	11	–	13	.458	26	–	26	.500
Little Rock ‍‍‍	11	–	13	.458	21	–	30	.412
Arkansas State ‍‍‍	10	–	14	.417	19	–	30	.388
Texas State ‍‍‍	9	–	15	.375	21	–	36	.368
x – Division champion ‡ – Tournament champion y – Invited to the NCAA tournament As of June 7, 2021; Rankings from D1Baseball

The 2021 Georgia State Panthers baseball team represented Georgia State University during the 2021 NCAA Division I baseball season. The Panthers played their home games at Georgia State Baseball Complex and were led by second-year head coach Brad Stromdahl. They were members of the Sun Belt Conference.

== Preseason ==
=== Signing Day Recruits ===
Player	Hometown	Previous Team
Pitchers
Will Cannon	Phenix City, Alabama	Central HS
Johnny Dow	Roswell, Georgia	Georgia Highlands
Micah Earwood	Cartersville, Georgia	Cartersville HS
Nick Lommen	Minnetonka, Minnesota	North Iowa Area CC
Jeremiah Newman	Atlanta, Georgia	Mays HS
Kyle Stephenson	Fairburn, Georgia	Trinity Christian
David White	Newnan, Georgia	The Heritage School
Hitters
Jesse Donohoe	Columbus, Georgia	Calvary Christian
Jo Jo Jackson	Stone Mountain, Georgia	Stephenson HS
Connor O'Neal	Columbus, Georgia	Northside HS
Trent Reddick	Dallas, Georgia	East Paulding HS
Max Ryerson	Conway, South Carolina	Gulf Coast State
Caleb Stewart	Waycross, Georgia	Ware County HS

=== Sun Belt Conference Coaches Poll ===
The Sun Belt Conference Coaches Poll was released on February 15, 2021 and the Panthers were picked to finish last in the East Division with 16 votes.

Coaches poll (East)
Predicted finish	Team	Votes (1st place)
1	Coastal Carolina	69 (10)
2	South Alabama	51 (1)
3	Georgia Southern	51 (1)
4	Troy	44
5	Appalachian State	21
6	Georgia State	16

=== Preseason All-Sun Belt Team & Honors ===
- Aaron Funk (LR, Pitcher)
- Jordan Jackson (GASO, Pitcher)
- Conor Angel (LA, Pitcher)
- Wyatt Divis (UTA, Pitcher)
- Lance Johnson (TROY, Pitcher)
- Caleb Bartolero (TROY, Catcher)
- William Sullivan (TROY, 1st Base)
- Luke Drumheller (APP, 2nd Base)
- Drew Frederic (TROY, Shortstop)
- Cooper Weiss (CCU, 3rd Base)
- Ethan Wilson (USA, Outfielder)
- Parker Chavers (CCU, Outfielder)
- Rigsby Mosley (TROY, Outfielder)
- Eilan Merejo (GSU, Designated Hitter)
- Andrew Beesly (ULM, Utility)

== Personnel ==
=== Roster ===
2021 Georgia State Panthers roster
Pitchers: 2 Mason Patel - Freshman; 4 Seth Clark - Sophomore; 5 Brandon Haston - Freshman; 7 Joseph Brandon - Sophomore; 12 Dawson Sweatt - Sophomore; 16 Griffin Bonner - Sophomore; 17 Michael Cherwenka - Redshirt Sophomore; 20 Chad Treadway - Freshman; 22 Pablo Barquero - Junior; 23 Tyler Koch - Senior; 25 Ryan Watson - Sophomore; 26 Trey Horton - Junior; 27 Cameron Jones - Freshman; 29 Jacob Riordan - Sophomore; 33 Rafael Acosta - Sophomore; 34 Chandler Dawson - Freshman; 35 Camren Landry - Freshman; 37 Jet Kern - Sophomore; 38 John Kirchner - Freshman; 39 Duncan Lutz - Freshman; 40 Dylan Matela - Redshirt Freshman	Catchers: 8 Tanner Gallman - Junior; 13 Kyle Hilton - Freshman; 15 Blaine Marchman - Freshman; 18 Eilan Merejo - Senior; 19 Will Goldberg - Redshirt Sophomore; 28 Dalton Davies - Senior; 45 Danny Grillo - Sophomore; Infielders: 6 Kalen Puckett - Junior; 10 Preston Joye - Freshman; 14 Will Mize - Freshman; 21 Griffin Cheney - Junior; 24 DeAngelo Abboud - Junior; 31 Ryan Glass - Junior; 38 Branson Bowling - Sophomore; 41 Ashby Smith - Sophomore; Outfielders: 3 Kyle Riesselmann - Freshman; 9 Dalton Pearson - Freshman; 11 Jonathan Ponder - Freshman; 42 Lavoisier Fisher - Sophomore; 44 Josh Smith - Sophomore

=== Coaching staff ===
2021 Georgia State Panthers coaching staff
- Brad Stromdahl – Head Coach – 2nd year
- Matt Taylor – Assistant Head Coach/Pitching Coach/Recruiting Coordinator – 2nd year
- Dalton Martinez – Assistant Head Coach – 2nd year
- Brandon Frazier – Volunteer Assistant Coach – 1st year
- Dean Sando – Director of Baseball Operations – 2nd year

== Schedule and results ==
Legend
	Georgia State win
	Georgia State loss
	Postponement/Cancelation/Suspensions
**Bold**	Georgia State team member

2021 Georgia State Panthers baseball game log
Regular season (17-36)

February (3-6)
Date	Opponent	Rank	Site/stadium	Score	Win	Loss	Save	TV	Attendance	Overall record	SBC record
Feb. 19	No. 14 West Virginia		Georgia State Baseball Complex • Decatur, GA	**L** 3–5 (10 inn)	Jeffrey (1–0)	**Patel** (0–1)	None		299	0–1	
Feb. 20	No. 14 West Virginia		Georgia State Baseball Complex • Decatur, GA	**W** 7–6	**Landry** (1–0)	Gonzalez (0–1)	None		349	1–1	
Feb. 20	No. 14 West Virginia		Georgia State Baseball Complex • Decatur, GA	**W** 20–4	**Acosta** (1–0)	Carr (0–1)	None		349	2–1	
Feb. 21	No. 14 West Virginia		Georgia State Baseball Complex • Decatur, GA	**L** 2–3	Hampton (1–0)	**Matela (0–1)**	Watters (1)		379	2–2	
Feb. 24	Georgia		Georgia State Baseball Complex • Decatur, GA	**L** 2–6	Pasqua (1–0)	**Patel (0–2)**	None	ESPN+	279	2–3	
Feb. 26	at No. 3 Vanderbilt		Hawkins Field • Nashville, TN	**W** 4–2	**Watson (1–0)**	Schultz (0–1)	**Treadway (1)**	SECN+	149	3–3	
Feb. 27	at No. 3 Vanderbilt		Hawkins Field • Nashville, TN	**L** 4–5	Garrett (1–0)	**Sweatt** (0–1)	Murphy (1)	SECN+	164	3–4	
Feb. 27	at No. 3 Vanderbilt		Hawkins Field • Nashville, TN	**L** 2–12	Rocker (2–0)	**Matela** (0–2)	None	SECN+	164	3–5	
Feb. 28	at No. 3 Vanderbilt		Hawkins Field • Nashville, TN	**L** 6–17	Leiter (2–0)	**Treadway** (0–1)	None	SECN+	163	3–6	

March (2-15)
Date	Opponent	Rank	Site/stadium	Score	Win	Loss	Save	TV	Attendance	Overall record	SBC record
Mar. 2	at No. 12 Georgia Tech		Russ Chandler Stadium • Atlanta, GA	**W** 10-1	**Patel** (1-2)	Roedig (0-1)	None	ACCN+	713	4-6	
Mar. 5	at No. 18 Tennessee		Lindsey Nelson Stadium • Knoxville, TN	**L** 1-6	Heflin (2-0)	**Watson** (1-1)	None	SECN+	958	4-7	
Mar. 6	at No. 18 Tennessee		Lindsey Nelson Stadium • Knoxville, TN	**L** 1-5	Tidwell (1-1)	**Jones** (0-1)	Walsh (2)	SECN+	1,025	4-8	
Mar. 7	at No. 18 Tennessee		Lindsey Nelson Stadium • Knoxville, TN	**L** 0-7	Pleasants (2-1)	**Treadway** (0-2)	None	SECN+	988	4-9	
Mar. 9	at No. 6 Florida		Florida Ballpark • Gainesville, FL	**L** 1-5	Milchin (1-0)	**Clark** (0-1)	None	SECN+	1,657	4-10	
Mar. 12	at Kentucky		Kentucky Proud Park • Lexington, KY	**L** 1-16	Stupp (2-0)	**Watson** (1-2)	None	SECN+	905	4-11	
Mar. 13	at Kentucky		Kentucky Proud Park • Lexington, KY	**L** 1-6	Hazelwood (3-0)	**Jones** (0-2)	None	SECN+	1,107	4-12	
Mar. 14	at Kentucky		Kentucky Proud Park • Lexington, KY	**L** 2-4	Jones (1-0)	**Patel** (1-3)	Harney (5)	SECN+		4-13	
Mar. 16	at Clemson		Doug Kingsmore Stadium • Clemson, SC	**L** 2-7	Hoffmann (2-0)	**Matela** (0-3)	None	ACCN+	1,280	4-14	
Mar. 19	at Louisiana–Monroe		Warhawk Field • Monroe, LA	**W** 4-3	**Watson** (2-2)	Barlow (2-2)	**Brandon** (1)	ESPN+	358	5-14	1-0
Mar. 20	at Louisiana–Monroe		Warhawk Field • Monroe, LA	**L** 1-3	Barnes (1-1)	**Jones** (0-3)	Wepf (1)	ESPN+	518	5-15	1-1
Mar. 21	at Louisiana–Monroe		Warhawk Field • Monroe	**L** 7-9	Lien (3-0)	**Dawson** (0-1)	Lindsay (1)		540	5-16	1-2
Mar. 23	Mercer		Georgia State Baseball Complex • Decatur, GA	**L** 3-5	Sutko (2-0)	**Brandon** (0-1)	None		305	5-17	
Mar. 26	Kennesaw State		Georgia State Baseball Complex • Decatur, GA	**L** 1-5	Rice (5-0)	**Watson** (2-3)	Holler (1)	ESPN+	291	5-18	
Mar. 27	Kennesaw State		Georgia State Baseball Complex • Decatur, GA	**L** 4-7	Torbert (3-1)	**Horton** (0-1)	Johnson (5)	ESPN+	345	5-19	
Mar. 28	at Kennesaw State		Fred Stillwell Stadium • Kennesaw, GA	**L** 4-16	Grogan (3-0)	**Dawson** (0-2)	None		120	5-20	
Mar. 29	at Kennesaw State		Fred Stillwell Stadium • Kennesaw, GA	**L** 1-5	Kennedy (2-0)	**Matela** (0-4)	None		120	5-21	

April (7-11)
Date	Opponent	Rank	Site/stadium	Score	Win	Loss	Save	TV	Attendance	Overall record	SBC record
Apr. 1	Georgia Southern		Georgia State Baseball Complex • Decatur, GA	**L** 1-23	Owens (3-0)	**Watson** (2-4)	None	ESPN+	292	5-22	1-3
Apr. 2	Georgia Southern		Georgia State Baseball Complex • Decatur, GA	**W** 7-6 (10 inns)	**Horton** (1-1)	Johnson (1-3)	None	ESPN+	356	6-22	2-3
Apr. 3	Georgia Southern		Georgia State Baseball Complex • Decatur, GA	**W** 3-2	**Sweatt** (2-1)	Jackson (1-4)	None	ESPN+	398	7-22	3-3
Apr. 6	at Mercer		OrthoGeorgia Park • Macon, GA	**L** 1-5	Lobus (5-2)	**Matela** (0-5)	None	ESPN+	400	7-23	
Apr. 9	at Appalachian State		Beaver Field at Jim and Bettie Smith Stadium • Boone, NC	**L** 2-4	Cornatzer (1-0)	**Jones** (0-4)	Ellington (3)		220	7-24	3-4
Apr. 10	at Appalachian State		Beaver Field at Jim and Bettie Smith Stadium • Boone, NC	**L** 7-9	Ellington (1-0)	**Treadway** (0-4)	Terrell (1)		220	7-25	3-5
Apr. 11	at Appalachian State		Beaver Field at Jim and Bettie Smith Stadium • Boone, NC	**W** 15-13	**Haston** (1-0)	Roberts (0-1)	**Barquero** (1)		220	8-25	4-5
Apr. 13	at Georgia		Foley Field • Athens, GA	**L** 7-10	Bearden (3-0)	**Koch** (0-1)	None	SECN+	664	8-26	
Apr. 16	Troy		Georgia State Baseball Complex • Decatur, GA	**L** 0-4	Gainous (5-3)	**Jones** (0-5)	None		214	8-27	4-6
Apr. 16	Troy		Georgia State Baseball Complex • Decatur, GA	**W** 7-5	**Treadway** (1-4)	Wilkinson (0-3)	**Lutz** (1)		398	9-27	5-6
Apr. 17	Troy		Georgia State Baseball Complex • Decatur, GA	**W** 17-15 (10 inns)	**Dawson** (1-2)	Snell (0-1)	None		401	10-27	6-6
Apr. 20	Georgia Tech		Georgia State Baseball Complex • Decatur, GA	**L** 2-7	Brown (1-0)	**Barquero** (0-1)	Huff (1)	ESPN+	321	10-28	
Apr. 21	at Mercer		OrthoGeorgia Park • Macon, GA	**L** 4-17	Farmer (3-0)	**Brandon** (0-2)	None	ESPN+	400	10-29	
Apr. 23	at South Alabama		Eddie Stanky Field • Mobile, AL	**L** 2-4	Smith (3-0)	**Jones** (0-6)	Lee (1)	ESPN+	839	10-30	6-7
Apr. 25	at South Alabama		Eddie Stanky Field • Mobile, AL	**L** 1-5	Boyd (3-1)	**Horton** (0-2)	None	ESPN+	850	10-31	6-8
Apr. 25	at South Alabama		Eddie Stanky Field • Mobile, AL	**L** 2-4	Booker (5-0)	**Matela** (0-6)	Samaniego (6)	ESPN+	850	10-32	6-9
Apr. 27	Wofford		Georgia State Baseball Complex • Decatur, GA	**W** 4-3 (14 inns)	**Haston** (2-0)	Marchal (1-2)	None		272	11-32	
Apr. 30	Coastal Carolina		Georgia State Baseball Complex • Decatur, GA	**W** 2-1	**Dawson** (2-2)	Peavyhouse (2-2)	None	ESPN+	382	12-32	7-9

May (5–4)
Date	Opponent	Rank	Site/stadium	Score	Win	Loss	Save	TV	Attendance	Overall record	SBC record
May 1	Coastal Carolina		Georgia State Baseball Complex • Decatur, GA	**L** 4-8	Kreuzer (1-0)	**Lutz** (0-1)	None	ESPN+	425	12-33	7-10
May 2	Coastal Carolina		Georgia State Baseball Complex • Decatur, GA	**L** 10-12	Joyce (1-0)	**Sweatt** (2-2)	Peavyhouse (1)	ESPN+	392	12-34	7-11
May 7	at Belmont		E. S. Rose Park • Nashville, TN	Game cancelled							
May 8	at Belmont		E. S. Rose Park • Nashville, TN	Game cancelled							
May 9	at Belmont		E. S. Rose Park • Nashville, TN	Game cancelled							
May 11	Mercer		Georgia State Baseball Complex • Decatur, GA	**L** 4-7	Lobus (8-3)	**Lutz** (0-2)	Sutko (9)		305	12-35	
May 14	at Texas State		Bobcat Ballpark • San Marcos, TX	**W** 7-4	**Jones** (1-6)	Leigh (4-6)	**Dawson** (1)			13-35	8-11
May 14	at Texas State		Bobcat Ballpark • San Marcos, TX	**W** 9-4	**Watson** (3-4)	Wood (3-4)	None		700	14-35	9-11
May 15	at Texas State		Bobcat Ballpark • San Marcos, TX	**W** 7-5	**Lutz** (1-2)	Herrmann (4-2)	**Clark** (1)	ESPN+	700	15-35	10-11
May 20	Little Rock		Georgia State Baseball Complex • Decatur, GA	**L** 3-7	Arnold (7-3)	**Jones** (1-7)	None		239	15-36	10-12
May 21	Little Rock		Georgia State Baseball Complex • Decatur, GA	**W** 5-0	**Dawson** (3-2)	Funk (2-6)	**Watson** (1)		278	16-36	11-12
May 22	Little Rock		Georgia State Baseball Complex • Decatur, GA	**W** 11-10	**Brandon** (1-2)	Barkley (6-5)	**Watson** (2)		351	17-36	12-12

Postseason (1–1)

SBC Tournament (1–1)
Date	Opponent	Seed/Rank	Site/stadium	Score	Win	Loss	Save	TV	Attendance	Overall record	Tournament record
May 25	vs. (5E) Louisiana–Monroe		Montgomery Riverwalk Stadium • Montgomery, AL	**W** 9-6	**Watson** (4-4)	Orton (0-2)	**Horton** (1)	ESPN+		18-36	1-0
May 26	vs. (2E) Georgia Southern		Montgomery Riverwalk Stadium • Montgomery, AL	**L** 1-10	Owens (7-2)	**Jones** (1-8)	None	ESPN+		18-37	1-1

Schedule source:

*Rankings are based on the team's current ranking in the D1Baseball poll.

== Postseason ==
=== Conference accolades ===
- Player of the Year: Mason McWhorter – GASO
- Pitcher of the Year: Hayden Arnold – LR
- Freshman of the Year: Garrett Gainous – TROY
- Newcomer of the Year: Drake Osborn – LA
- Coach of the Year: Mark Calvi – USA

All Conference First Team

- Connor Cooke (LA)
- Hayden Arnold (LR)
- Carlos Tavera (UTA)
- Nick Jones (GASO)
- Drake Osborn (LA)
- Robbie Young (APP)
- Luke Drumheller (APP)
- Drew Frederic (TROY)
- Ben Klutts (ARST)
- Mason McWhorter (GASO)
- Logan Cerny (TROY)
- Ethan Wilson (USA)
- Cameron Jones (GSU)
- Ben Fitzgerald (LA)

All Conference Second Team

- JoJo Booker (USA)
- Tyler Tuthill (APP)
- Jeremy Lee (USA)
- Aaron Barkley (LR)
- BT Riopelle (CCU)
- Dylan Paul (UTA)
- Travis Washburn (ULM)
- Eric Brown (CCU)
- Grant Schulz (ULM)
- Tyler Duncan (ARST)
- Parker Chavers (CCU)
- Josh Smith (GSU)
- Andrew Miller (UTA)
- Noah Ledford (GASO)
