= 2021 Sun Belt Conference baseball tournament =

- Teams: 10
- Format: Double-elimination
- Finals site: Riverwalk Stadium; Montgomery, Alabama
- Champions: South Alabama (11th title)
- Television: ESPN+

2021 Sun Belt Conference baseball standings
	Conf.				Overall
Team	W		L	PCT	W		L	PCT
East Division
South Alabama ^{x}‍‍‡‍^{y}	15	–	9	.625	36	–	22	.621
Georgia Southern ‍‍‍	14	–	10	.583	34	–	23	.596
Troy ‍‍‍	13	–	11	.542	27	–	26	.509
Appalachian State ‍‍‍	11	–	10	.524	21	–	31	.404
Georgia State ‍‍‍	12	–	12	.500	18	–	37	.327
Coastal Carolina ‍‍‍	9	–	12	.429	27	–	24	.529
West Division
Louisiana ^{x}‍‍‍	13	–	11	.542	32	–	23	.582
UT Arlington ‍‍‍	13	–	11	.542	27	–	30	.474
Louisiana–Monroe ‍‍‍	11	–	13	.458	26	–	26	.500
Little Rock ‍‍‍	11	–	13	.458	21	–	30	.412
Arkansas State ‍‍‍	10	–	14	.417	19	–	30	.388
Texas State ‍‍‍	9	–	15	.375	21	–	36	.368
x – Division champion ‡ – Tournament champion y – Invited to the NCAA tournament As of June 7, 2021; Rankings from D1Baseball

The 2021 Sun Belt Conference baseball tournament was held at Riverwalk Stadium in Montgomery, Alabama, from May 25 to May 30. The tournament used a double-elimination format as in past years. South Alabama, the winner of the tournament, earned the Sun Belt Conference's automatic bid to the 2021 NCAA Division I baseball tournament.

== Seeding ==
Since 2017, the top ten teams (based on conference results) from the conference earn are invited to the tournament. The teams will be seeded based on conference winning percentage, with the bottom four seeds competing in a play-in round. The remaining eight teams will then play a two bracket, double-elimination tournament. The winner of each bracket will play a championship final.

== Results ==
=== Play-in round ===
Tuesday, May 25
Team	R
#4 West Little Rock	1
#6 East Coastal Carolina	15

Tuesday, May 25
Team	R
#3 East Troy	6
#5 West Arkansas State	9

Tuesday, May 25
Team	R
#3 West ULM	6
#5 East Georgia State	9

Tuesday, May 25
Team	R
#4 East App State	1
#6 West Texas State	0

=== Double-elimination round ===
First round
1E	South Alabama	14
6E	Coastal Carolina	7
2W	UTA	8
5W	Arkansas State	3
2E	Georgia Southern	10
5E	Georgia State	1
1W	Louisiana	12
6W	Texas State	6

Second round
1E	South Alabama	6
4W	Little Rock	2
2W	UTA	11
3E	Troy	5
2E	Georgia Southern	9
3W	ULM	5
1W	Louisiana	7
4E	App State	2

Semifinals
1E	South Alabama	5
2W	UTA	4
2E	Georgia Southern	3
1W	Louisiana	2

Finals
1E	South Alabama	10
2E	Georgia Southern	4
