= 2021 Texas State Bobcats baseball team =

American college baseball season

2021 Texas State Bobcats baseball
- Conference: Sun Belt Conference
- West Division
- Record: 21–36 (9–15 SBC)
- Head coach: Steven Trout (2nd season)
- Assistant coaches: Josh Blakley; Chad Massengale
- Home stadium: Bobcat Ballpark

2021 Sun Belt Conference baseball standings
	Conf.				Overall
Team	W		L	PCT	W		L	PCT
East Division
South Alabama ^{x}‍‍‡‍^{y}	15	–	9	.625	36	–	22	.621
Georgia Southern ‍‍‍	14	–	10	.583	34	–	23	.596
Troy ‍‍‍	13	–	11	.542	27	–	26	.509
Appalachian State ‍‍‍	11	–	10	.524	21	–	31	.404
Georgia State ‍‍‍	12	–	12	.500	18	–	37	.327
Coastal Carolina ‍‍‍	9	–	12	.429	27	–	24	.529
West Division
Louisiana ^{x}‍‍‍	13	–	11	.542	32	–	23	.582
UT Arlington ‍‍‍	13	–	11	.542	27	–	30	.474
Louisiana–Monroe ‍‍‍	11	–	13	.458	26	–	26	.500
Little Rock ‍‍‍	11	–	13	.458	21	–	30	.412
Arkansas State ‍‍‍	10	–	14	.417	19	–	30	.388
Texas State ‍‍‍	9	–	15	.375	21	–	36	.368
x – Division champion ‡ – Tournament champion y – Invited to the NCAA tournament As of June 7, 2021; Rankings from D1Baseball

The 2021 Texas State Bobcats baseball team represented Texas State University during the 2021 NCAA Division I baseball season. The Bobcats played their home games at Bobcat Ballpark and were led by second-year head coach Steven Trout. They were members of the Sun Belt Conference.

== Preseason ==
=== Signing Day Recruits ===
Player	Hometown	Previous Team
Pitchers
Hunter Caldwell	Hardin, Texas	Hardin County HS
Tyler Cooper	Kyle, Texas	Hays HS
Jeb Drewery	Hallsville, Texas	Hallsville HS
McCray Gann	Odessa, Texas	Permian HS
Dylan Kerbow	The Woodlands, Texas	The Woodlands HS
Kyler Kirkpatrick	Round Rock, Texas	Round Rock HS
Victor Loa	Los Fresnos, Texas	Los Fresnos HS
Edward Mendoza	Eagle Pass, Texas	Eagle Pass HS
Nick Moore	Plano, Texas	Plano West HS
Travis Phelps	Alvin, Texas	Galveston College
Hitters
Kyle Atkinson	New Boston, Texas	New Boston HS
Chris Bernal	McAllen, Texas	McAllen HS
Ryder Hernandez	Cedar Park, Texas	Cedar Park HS
Ryan Leary	Liberty Hill, Texas	Liberty Hill HS
Daylan Pena	Corpus Christi, Texas	Veterans Memorial HS
Damien Whitfield	Atlanta, Georgia	Next Level Academy

=== Sun Belt Conference Coaches Poll ===
The Sun Belt Conference Coaches Poll was released on February 15, 2021 and the Bobcats were picked to finish first in the West Division and second overall in the conference.

Coaches poll (West)
Predicted finish	Team	Votes (1st place)
1	Texas State	65 (6)
2	UT Arlington	58 (4)
3	Louisiana	52 (2)
4	Little Rock	33
5	Louisiana–Monroe	27
6	Arkansas State	13

== Roster ==
2021 Texas State Bobcats roster
Pitchers: 3 Trevis Sundgren - Junior; 9 Triston Dixon - Sophomore; 12 Jacob Millender - Junior; 13 Cade Bullinger - Redshirt Junior; 14 Hayden Vanderroest - Freshman; 16 Tristan Stivors - Junior; 18 Wes Engle - Redshirt Senior; 20 Reece Gould - Sophomore; 26 Tristan McCraw - Redshirt Sophomore; 27 Otto Wofford - Freshman; 28 Matthew Nicholas - Redshirt Sophomore; 31 Garrett Herrmann - Senior; 32 Dontae Woodard - Sophomore; 33 Cody Farmer - Sophomore; 34 Zeke Wood - Sophomore; 35 Cameron Bush - Redshirt Freshman; 39 Tony Robie - Freshman; 40 Austin Smith - Redshirt Sophomore; 41 Carson Keithley - Freshman; 42 Zachary Leigh - Senior; 43 Rhett McCaffety - Freshman; 44 Cade Medlin - Freshman; 45 Jonathan Martinez - Freshman; 47 Colby Cooke - Freshman; 48 Josh Hernandez - Freshman; 50 Jerry Cuevas - Freshman; Isaac Ponce - Freshman	Catchers: 2 Tucker Redden - Senior; 4 Bryce Bonner - Senior; 21 Peyton Lewis - Sophomore; Infielders: 1 Jaxon Williams - Senior; 8 Dalton Shuffield - Junior; 10 Justin Thompson - Junior; 11 Cameron Gibbons - Junior; 23 Jose Gonzalez - Sophomore; 24 Wesley Faison - Junior; 25 Cole Coffey - Senior; 29 Casey Sunseri - Freshman; 36 Cade Manning - Freshman; 38 Johnny Gonzales - Senior; 49 Fabian Mayfield - Freshman	Outfielders: 6 Will Hollis - Redshirt Senior; 7 John Wuthrich - Junior; 15 Chase Evans - Senior; 17 Isaiah Ortega-Jones - Junior; 19 Ben McClain - Redshirt Sophomore; 46 Jared Younce - Freshman

=== Coaching staff ===
2021 Texas State Bobcats coaching staff
- Steven Trout – Head Coach – 2nd year
- Josh Blakley – Assistant Head Coach/Recruiting Coordinator – 3rd year
- Chad Massengale – Assistant Head Coach – 4th year
- Jerry Cervantez – Volunteer Assistant Coach – 3rd year
- Todd Haney – Director of Player Development & Analytics – 3rd year

== Schedule and results ==
Legend
	Texas State win
	Texas State loss
	Postponement/Cancelation/Suspensions
**Bold**	Texas State team member

2021 Texas State Bobcats baseball game log
Regular season (21-34)

February (3-5)
Date	Opponent	Rank	Site/stadium	Score	Win	Loss	Save	TV	Attendance	Overall record	SBC record
Feb. 20	BYU		Bobcat Ballpark • San Marcos, TX	**W** 5-4	**Smith** (1-0)	Walker (0-1)	**Stivors** (1)		165	1-0	
Feb. 20	BYU		Bobcat Ballpark • San Marcos, TX	**L** 4-9	Robison (1-0)	**Sundgren** (0-1)	McLaughlin (1)		151	1-1	
Feb. 22	BYU		Bobcat Ballpark • San Marcos, TX	**W** 11-6	**Smith** (2-0)	Mabeus (0-1)	**Dixon** (1)		700	2-1	
Feb. 23	BYU		Bobcat Ballpark • San Marcos, TX	**L** 6-7	McIntyre (1-0)	**Stivors** (0-1)	None	ESPN+	700	2-2	
Feb. 24	at Sam Houston State		Don Sanders Stadium • Huntsville, TX	**W** 5-4	**Gould** (1-0)	Beard (0-1)	**Sundgren** (1)		225	3-2	
Feb. 27	at Sacramento State		John Smith Field • Sacramento, CA	**L** 4-8	Randall (1-0)	**Leigh** (0-1)	None		15	3-3	
Feb. 27	at Sacramento State		John Smith Field • Sacramento, CA	**L** 4-5	Tinsley (1-0)	**Smith** (2-1)	Churby (2)		15	3-4	
Feb. 28	at Sacramento State		John Smith Field • Sacramento, CA	**L** 1-7	Saul (1-1)	**Wood** (0-1)	None		15	3-5	

March (8-9)
Date	Opponent	Rank	Site/stadium	Score	Win	Loss	Save	TV	Attendance	Overall record	SBC record
Mar. 2	New Mexico State		Bobcat Ballpark • San Marcos, TX	**W** 8-6	**Wofford** (1-0)	Laukkanen (0-2)	**Stivors** (2)		700	4-5	
Mar. 3	No. 19 Texas		Bobcat Ballpark • San Marcos, TX	**L** 3-10	Wenzel (2-0)	**Bush** (0-1)	None	ESPN+	700	4-6	
Shriner's Hospitals for Children College Classic
Mar. 5	vs. No. 10 Texas Tech		Minute Maid Park • Houston, TX	**L** 4-8	Key (1-0)	**Leigh** (0-2)	None			4-7	
Mar. 6	vs. No. 13 TCU		Minute Maid Park • Houston, TX	**L** 0-10 (8 inns)	Smith (2-0)	**Sundgren** (0-1)	None			4-8	
Mar. 7	vs. Rice		Minute Maid Park • Houston, TX	**W** 9-1	**Wood** (1-1)	Gallant (1-1)	None		2,255	5-8	
Mar. 9	No. 11 TCU		Bobcat Ballpark • San Marcos, TX	**W** 11-1 (7 inns)	**Herrmann** (1-0)	Meador (1-1)	None	ESPN+	700	6-8	
Mar. 12	Houston		Bobcat Ballpark • San Marcos, TX	**L** 3-12	Gasser (2-1)	**Leigh** (0-3)	None	ESPN+	700	6-9	
Mar. 13	Houston		Bobcat Ballpark • San Marcos, TX	**W** 15-9	**Bush** (1-1)	Bretz (0-1)	None	ESPN+	700	7-9	
Mar. 14	Houston		Bobcat Ballpark • San Marcos, TX	**L** 7-8	Deese (2-1)	**Smith** (2-2)	Cherry (1)	ESPN+	700	7-10	
Mar. 17	Rice		Bobcat Ballpark • San Marcos, TX	**W** 16-5 (7 inns)	**Herrmann** (2-0)	Zaskoda (1-1)	None	ESPN+	700	8-10	
Mar. 19	at Little Rock		Gary Hogan Field • Little Rock, AR	**L** 1-2 (11 inns)	Barkley (4-0)	**Wofford** (1-1)	None	ESPN+	212	8-11	0-1
Mar. 20	at Little Rock		Gary Hogan Field • Little Rock, AR	**L** 0-12	Arnold (2-2)	**Bush** (1-2)	None	ESPN+	238	8-12	0-2
Mar. 21	at Little Rock		Gary Hogan Field • Little Rock, AR	**L** 4-7	Weatherley (2-0)	**Nicholas** (0-1)	Barkley (2)	ESPN+	254	8-13	0-3
Mar. 24	Oklahoma		Bobcat Ballpark • San Marcos, TX	**W** 5-2	**Wood** (2-1)	Abram (1-1)	None	ESPN+	677	9-13	
Mar. 26	Louisiana–Monroe		Bobcat Ballpark • San Marcos, TX	**L** 5-6	Barlow (3-2)	**Leigh** (0-4)	Orton (2)	ESPN+	755	9-14	0-4
Mar. 27	Louisiana–Monroe		Bobcat Ballpark • San Marcos, TX	**W** 6-5	**Stivors** (1-1)	Martin (0-1)	None	ESPN+	733	10-14	1-4
Mar. 28	Louisiana–Monroe		Bobcat Ballpark • San Marcos, TX	**W** 4-1	**Herrmann** (3-0)	Wrobel (1-2)	**Stivors** (3)	ESPN+	712	11-14	2-4
Mar. 30	at Baylor		Baylor Ballpark • Waco, TX	**L** 2-4	Ashkinos (3-0)	**Wood** (2-2)	Boyd (4)	ESPN+	1,098	11-15	

April (7-10)
Date	Opponent	Rank	Site/stadium	Score	Win	Loss	Save	TV	Attendance	Overall record	SBC record
Apr. 1	UT Arlington		Bobcat Ballpark • San Marcos, TX	**W** 2-0	**Leigh** (1-4)	Tavera (0-4)	None		681	12-15	3-4
Apr. 2	UT Arlington		Bobcat Ballpark • San Marcos, TX	**L** 3-9	Bullard (4-2)	**Bush** (1-3)	None	ESPN+	700	12-16	3-5
Apr. 3	UT Arlington		Bobcat Ballpark • San Marcos, TX	**L** 6-10	Norris (3-2)	**Stivors** (1-2)	None	ESPN+	700	12-17	3-6
Apr. 6	at Texas–Rio Grande Valley		UTRGV Baseball Stadium • Edinburg, TX	**W** 7-4	**Wofford** (2-1)	De Leon (0-1)	**Stivors** (4)		1,175	13-17	
Apr. 9	at Troy		Riddle–Pace Field • Troy, AL	**W** 4-2	**Leigh** (2-4)	Ortiz (2-4)	**Stivors** (5)	ESPN+	756	14-17	4-6
Apr. 10	at Troy		Riddle–Pace Field • Troy, AL	**W** 3-1	**Herrmann** (4-0)	Gainous (4-3)	**Bush** (1)	ESPN+	1,005	15-17	5-6
Apr. 11	at Troy		Riddle–Pace Field • Troy, AL	**L** 3-5	Oates (2-1)	**Martinez** (0-1)	Newton (1)	ESPN+	703	15-18	5-7
Apr. 13	Texas A&M		Bobcat Ballpark • San Marcos, TX	**L** 4-8	Magers (2-1)	**Sundgren** (0-3)	Jozwiak (4)	ESPN+	700	15-19	
Apr. 16	at Washington		Husky Ballpark • Seattle, WA	**L** 5-10	Gerling (2-2)	**Leigh** (2-5)	None		127	15-20	
Apr. 17	at Washington		Husky Ballpark • Seattle, WA	**L** 3-6	Guerrero (1-1)	**Herrmann** (4-1)	Delorefice (4)		156	15-21	
Apr. 18	at Washington		Husky Ballpark • Seattle, WA	**L** 1-2	Bloebaum (1-3)	**Wood** (2-3)	Delorefice (5)		145	15-22	
Apr. 20	No. 3 Texas		Bobcat Ballpark • San Marcos, TX	**L** 1-5	Hansen (4-1)	**Robie** (0-1)	None	ESPN+	700	15-23	
Apr. 23	Arkansas State		Bobcat Ballpark • San Marcos, TX	**W** 11-4	**Leigh** (3-5)	Hudson (2-1)	None	ESPN+	700	16-23	6-7
Apr. 24	Arkansas State		Bobcat Ballpark • San Marcos, TX	**W** 6-5	**Stivors** (2-2)	Stone (0-2)	None		700	17-23	7-7
Apr. 25	Arkansas State		Bobcat Ballpark • San Marcos, TX	**L** 1-12	Holt (3-2)	**Dixon** (0-1)	Jumper (3)		700	17-24	7-8
Apr. 27	at Texas A&M		Olsen Field at Blue Bell Park • College Station, TX	**L** 0-4	Childress (3-4)	**Smith** (2-3)	Weber (1)		1,081	17-25	
Apr. 30	at Louisiana		M. L. Tigue Moore Field at Russo Park • Lafayette, LA	**W** 9-3	**Leigh** (4-5)	Arrighetti (6-4)	None	ESPN+	887	18-25	8-8

May (3–9)
Date	Opponent	Rank	Site/stadium	Score	Win	Loss	Save	TV	Attendance	Overall record	SBC record
May 1	at Louisiana		M. L. Tigue Moore Field at Russo Park • Lafayette, LA	**L** 0-9	Cooke (5-2)	**Wood** (2-4)	None		826	18-26	8-9
May 2	at Louisiana		M. L. Tigue Moore Field at Russo Park • Lafayette, LA	**W** 6-2	**Wofford** (3-1)	Perrin (1-2)	None		426	19-26	9-9
May 4	at No. 6 Texas		UFCU Disch–Falk Field • Austin, TX	**L** 1-4	Quintanilla (4-0)	**Dixon** (0-2)	Nixon (6)		1,898	19-27	
May 7	South Alabama		Bobcat Ballpark • San Marcos, TX	**W** 6-3	**Bush** (2-3)	Samaniego (1-2)	None		700	20-27	10-9
May 8	South Alabama		Bobcat Ballpark • San Marcos, TX	**W** 13-4	**Wood** (3-4)	Boswell (2-3)	None		683	21-27	11-9
May 9	South Alabama		Bobcat Ballpark • San Marcos, TX	**L** 4-9	Dalton (5-3)	**Nicholas** (0-2)	None	ESPN+	676	21-28	11-10
May 14	Georgia State		Bobcat Ballpark • San Marcos, TX	**L** 4-7	Jones (1-6)	**Leigh** (4-6)	Dawson (1)			21-29	11-11
May 14	Georgia State		Bobcat Ballpark • San Marcos, TX	**L** 4-9	Watson (3-4)	**Wood** (3-5)	None	ESPN+	700	21-30	11-12
May 15	Georgia State		Bobcat Ballpark • San Marcos, TX	**L** 5-7	Lutz (1-2)	**Herrmann** (4-2)	Clark (1)	ESPN+	700	21-31	11-13
May 18	at No. 12 TCU		Lupton Stadium • Fort Worth, TX	Game cancelled							
May 20	at Coastal Carolina		Springs Brooks Stadium • Conway, SC	**L** 5-10	Sharkley (4-1)	**Leigh** (4-7)	None	ESPN+	1,000	21-32	11-14
May 21	at Coastal Carolina		Springs Brooks Stadium • Conway, SC	**L** 7-8 (10 inns)	Abney (3-2)	**Stivors** (2-3)	None	ESPN+	1,000	21-33	11-15
May 22	at Coastal Carolina		Springs Brooks Stadium • Conway, SC	**L** 2-12 (7 inns)	Sibley (1-0)	**Robie** (0-2)	None	ESPN+	1,000	21-34	11-16

Postseason (0–2)

SBC Tournament (0–2)
Date	Opponent	Seed/Rank	Site/stadium	Score	Win	Loss	Save	TV	Attendance	Overall record	Tournament record
May 25	vs. (4E) Appalachian State	(6W)	Montgomery Riverwalk Stadium • Montgomery, AL	**L** 0-1	Peterson (2-3)	**Leigh** (4-8)	Ellington (5)	ESPN+		21-35	0-1
May 26	vs. (1W) Louisiana	(6W)	Montgomery Riverwalk Stadium • Montgomery, AL	**L** 6-12	Burk (5-0)	**Sundgren** (0-4)	None	ESPN+		21-36	0-2

Schedule source:

*Rankings are based on the team's current ranking in the D1Baseball poll.

== Rankings ==
Ranking movements Legend: ██ Increase in ranking ██ Decrease in ranking — = Not ranked RV = Received votes
	Week																
Poll	Pre	1	2	3	4	5	6	7	8	9	10	11	12	13	14	15	Final
Coaches'	RV	RV*	—	—	—	—	—	—	—	—	—						
Baseball America	—	—	—	—	—	—	—	—	—	—	—						
Collegiate Baseball^	30	—	—	—	—	—	—	—	—	—	—						
NCBWA†	RV	—	—	—	—	—	—	—	—	—	—						
D1Baseball	—	—	—	—	—	—	—	—	—	—	—						

^ Collegiate Baseball ranked 40 teams in their preseason poll, but only ranked 30 teams weekly during the season.
† NCBWA ranks 30 teams in their preseason poll, but only ranks 25 teams weekly during the season.
* A new poll was not released for this week, so for comparison purposes, the previous week's ranking is inserted in this week's slot.
