= 2021 UT Arlington Mavericks baseball team =

American college baseball season

2021 UT Arlington Mavericks baseball

SBC Tournament Pool D champions
- Conference: Sun Belt Conference
- West Division
- Record: 27–30 (13–11 SBC)
- Head coach: Darin Thomas (14th season)
- Assistant coaches: Taylor Dugas; Brady Cox
- Home stadium: Clay Gould Ballpark

2021 Sun Belt Conference baseball standings
	Conf.				Overall
Team	W		L	PCT	W		L	PCT
East Division
South Alabama ^{x}‍‍‡‍^{y}	15	–	9	.625	36	–	22	.621
Georgia Southern ‍‍‍	14	–	10	.583	34	–	23	.596
Troy ‍‍‍	13	–	11	.542	27	–	26	.509
Appalachian State ‍‍‍	11	–	10	.524	21	–	31	.404
Georgia State ‍‍‍	12	–	12	.500	18	–	37	.327
Coastal Carolina ‍‍‍	9	–	12	.429	27	–	24	.529
West Division
Louisiana ^{x}‍‍‍	13	–	11	.542	32	–	23	.582
UT Arlington ‍‍‍	13	–	11	.542	27	–	30	.474
Louisiana–Monroe ‍‍‍	11	–	13	.458	26	–	26	.500
Little Rock ‍‍‍	11	–	13	.458	21	–	30	.412
Arkansas State ‍‍‍	10	–	14	.417	19	–	30	.388
Texas State ‍‍‍	9	–	15	.375	21	–	36	.368
x – Division champion ‡ – Tournament champion y – Invited to the NCAA tournament As of June 7, 2021; Rankings from D1Baseball

The 2021 UT Arlington Mavericks baseball team represented the University of Texas at Arlington during the 2021 NCAA Division I baseball season. The Mavericks played their home games at Clay Gould Ballpark and were led by fourteenth-year head coach Darin Thomas. They were members of the Sun Belt Conference.

== Preseason ==
=== Signing Day Recruits ===
Player	Hometown	Previous Team
Pitchers
Gray Bailey	Glendale, Arizona	Mountain Ridge HS
Hitters
Tanner Rice	Mesa, Arizona	Red Mountain HS
Evan Anderson	Allen, Texas	Allen HS

=== Sun Belt Conference Coaches Poll ===
The Sun Belt Conference Coaches Poll was released on February 15, 2021 and the Mavericks were picked to finish second in the West Division.

Coaches poll (West)
Predicted finish	Team	Votes (1st place)
1	Texas State	65 (6)
2	UT Arlington	58 (4)
3	Louisiana	52 (2)
4	Little Rock	33
5	Louisiana–Monroe	27
6	Arkansas State	13

=== Preseason All-Sun Belt Team & Honors ===
- Aaron Funk (LR, Pitcher)
- Jordan Jackson (GASO, Pitcher)
- Conor Angel (LA, Pitcher)
- Wyatt Divis (UTA, Pitcher)
- Lance Johnson (TROY, Pitcher)
- Caleb Bartolero (TROY, Catcher)
- William Sullivan (TROY, 1st Base)
- Luke Drumheller (APP, 2nd Base)
- Drew Frederic (TROY, Shortstop)
- Cooper Weiss (CCU, 3rd Base)
- Ethan Wilson (USA, Outfielder)
- Parker Chavers (CCU, Outfielder)
- Rigsby Mosley (TROY, Outfielder)
- Eilan Merejo (GSU, Designated Hitter)
- Andrew Beesly (ULM, Utility)

== Roster ==
2021 UT Arlington Mavericks roster
Pitchers: 4 JD Wadleigh - Sophomore; 5 Tanner King - Junior; 12 Tristan Tom - Redshirt Senior; 15 Wyatt Divis - Senior; 18 Carlos Tavera - Junior; 20 Zach Peters - Freshman; 22 Michael Wong - Junior; 24 David Moffat - Junior; 25 Brayden Brooks - Sophomore; 26 Kody Bullard - Redshirt Junior; 29 Jarod Seals - Sophomore; 31 Jack Hagan - Freshman; 33 Brennan Smith - Redshirt Sophomore; 34 Cade Winquest - Sophomore; 35 Ryan Thomas - Junior; 37 Cade Citelli - Freshman; 40 Matt Novis - Sophomore; 41 Zach Norris - Sophomore; 44 Logan Austin - Redshirt Senior; 45 Jackson Blue - Freshman; 49 Riley Bost - Sophomore; 50 Will Thomas - Freshman; 54 Trevor Pruitt - Sophomore	Catchers: 10 Cole Solomon - Redshirt Junior; 17 Sam Gotlieb - Junior; 21 Andrew Miller - Senior; 32 Sam Crowell - Freshman; Infielders: 3 Matthew Cavanagh - Sophomore; 6 Boone Montgomery - Junior; 7 Tyler Rice - Sophomore; 11 Dylan Paul - Redshirt Senior; 13 Josh Minjarez - Redshirt Senior; 14 Tommy Williams - Junior; 23 Steven Saunders - Sophomore; 36 Justin Marino - Redshirt Sophomore; 42 Cason Gregory - Freshman; Outfielders: 2 Connor Aube - Senior; 9 Tad Thompson - Redshirt Freshman; 16 Anthony Dominguez - Senior; 19 Zach Henry - Freshman; 28 Phillip Childs - Redshirt Junior

=== Coaching staff ===
2021 UT Arlington Mavericks coaching staff
- Darin Thomas – Head Coach – 14th year
- Taylor Dugas – Assistant Head Coach/Recruiting Coordinator – 1st year
- Brady Cox – Assistant Head Coach – 1st year
- Galen McSpadden – Volunteer Assistant Coach – 1st year
- Cameron Dobbs – Student Coach – 1st year
- Cody Wernli – Director of Baseball Operations

== Schedule and results ==
Legend
	UT Arlington win
	UT Arlington loss
	Postponement/Cancelation/Suspensions
**Bold**	UT Arlington team member

2021`UT Arlington Mavericks baseball game log
Regular season (25-29)

February (3-2)
Date	Opponent	Rank	Site/stadium	Score	Win	Loss	Save	TV	Attendance	Overall record	SBC record
Feb. 19	at Texas A&M–Corpus Christi		Chapman Field • Corpus Christi, TX	Cancelled due to threat of freezing rain/sleet/snow in Corpus Christi							
Feb. 20	at Texas A&M–Corpus Christi		Chapman Field • Corpus Christi, TX	Cancelled due to threat of freezing rain/sleet/snow in Corpus Christi							
Feb. 21	at Texas A&M–Corpus Christi		Chapman Field • Corpus Christi, TX	Cancelled due to threat of freezing rain/sleet/snow in Corpus Christi							
Feb. 23	vs. Tarleton State		Global Life Field • Arlington, TX	**W** 14-1	**Bullard** (1-0)	Waltmon (0-1)	None			1-0	
Feb. 24	at Oklahoma		Globe Life Field • Arlington, TX	**L** 1-7	Carmichael (1-0)	**Norris** (0-1)	None			1-1	
Feb. 26	Stephen F. Austin		Clay Gould Ballpark • Arlington, TX	**L** 2-5	Gennari (1-0)	**Novis** (0-1)	None			1-2	
Feb. 27	Stephen F. Austin		Clay Gould Ballpark • Arlington, TX	**W** 5-3	**Bullard** (2-0)	Stobart (0-1)	**Wong** (1)		314	2-2	
Feb. 27	Stephen F. Austin		Clay Gould Ballpark • Arlington, TX	**W** 2-1	**Moffat** (1-0)	Todd (0-1)	**Norris** (1)		314	3-2	

March (7-12)
Date	Opponent	Rank	Site/stadium	Score	Win	Loss	Save	TV	Attendance	Overall record	SBC record
Mar. 2	Abilene Christian		Clay Gould Ballpark • Arlington, TX	**W** 3-2	**Norris** (1-1)	Sells (0-1)	None		314	4-2	
Mar. 5	at UTSA		Roadrunner Field • San Antonio, TX	**L** 1-13	Malone (1-0)	**Tavera** (0-1)	None		130	4-3	
Mar. 6	at UTSA		Roadrunner Field • San Antonio, TX	**L** 0-3 (7 inns)	Daughety (2-0)	**Bullard** (2-1)	None			4-4	
Mar. 6	at UTSA		Roadrunner Field • San Antonio, TX	**W** 2-1	**King** (1-0)	Mason (1-1)	**Wong** (2)		148	5-4	
Mar. 7	at UTSA		Roadrunner Field • San Antonio, TX	**L** 1-16	Easterling (1-0)	**Novis** (0-2)	None		109	5-5	
Mar. 9	at Oklahoma		L. Dale Mitchell Baseball Park • Norman, OK	**L** 5-15	Carmichael (2-0)	**Winquest** (0-1)	None		545	5-6	
Mar. 11	Lamar		Clay Gould Ballpark • Arlington, TX	**L** 0-3	Palmer (1-0)	**Tavera** (0-2)	Dallas (4)		314	5-7	
Mar. 12	Lamar		Clay Gould Ballpark • Arlington, TX	**L** 0-2	Bravo (2-0)	**Bullard** (2-2)	Dallas (5)		314	5-8	
Mar. 13	Lamar		Clay Gould Ballpark • Arlington, TX	**W** 11-3	**Moffat** (2-0)	Mize (1-1)	None		314	6-8	
Mar. 14	Lamar		Clay Gould Ballpark • Arlington, TX	**L** 0-4	Johnson (1-0)	**Winquest** (0-2)	Douthit (1)		314	6-9	
Mar. 19	South Alabama		Clay Gould Ballpark • Arlington, TX	**W** 3-2	**Wong** (1-0)	Dalton (3-2)	None		314	7-9	1-0
Mar. 20	South Alabama		Clay Gould Ballpark • Arlington, TX	**L** 4-6	Smith (1-0)	**Norris** (1-2)	Samaniego (3)		314	7-10	1-1
Mar. 21	South Alabama		Clay Gould Ballpark • Arlington, TX	**L** 3-6	Booker (1-0)	**Moffat** (2-1)	Dalton (1)		314	7-11	1-2
Mar. 23	Baylor		Clay Gould Ballpark • Arlington, TX	**W** 4-3	**Austin** (1-0)	Boyd (0-1)	None		314	8-11	
Mar. 26	at Houston		Schroeder Park • Houston, TX	**L** 1-4	Gasser (3-2)	**Tavera** (0-3)	Cherry (2)	ESPN+	209	8-12	
Mar. 27	at Houston		Schroeder Park • Houston, TX	**W** 12-7	**Bullard** (3-2)	Schultz (2-2)	None	ESPN+	214	9-12	
Mar. 28	at Houston		Schroeder Park • Houston, TX	**W** 8-7	**Norris** (2-2)	Prayer (0-3)	**Wong** (3)	ESPN+	214	10-12	
Mar. 28	at Houston		Schroeder Park • Houston, TX	**L** 4-5	Huggins (1-0)	**Austin** (1-1)	None	ESPN+	145	10-13	
Mar. 30	No. 12 TCU		Clay Gould Ballpark • Arlington, TX	**L** 3-5	King (2-1)	**Winquest** (0-3)	Green (5)		314	10-14	

April (9-8)
Date	Opponent	Rank	Site/stadium	Score	Win	Loss	Save	TV	Attendance	Overall record	SBC record
Apr. 1	at Texas State		Bobcat Ballpark • San Marcos, TX	**L** 0-2	Leigh (1-4)	**Tavera** (0-4)	None		681	10-15	1-3
Apr. 2	at Texas State		Bobcat Ballpark • San Marcos, TX	**W** 9-3	**Bullard** (4-2)	Bush (1-3)	None		700	11-15	2-3
Apr. 3	at Texas State		Bobcat Ballpark • San Marcos, TX	**W** 10-6	**Norris** (3-2)	Stivors (1-2)	None		700	12-15	3-3
Apr. 6	at Baylor		Baylor Ballpark • Waco, TX	**L** 6-7	Leckich (1-0)	**Norris** (3-3)	Boyd (5)	ESPN+	1,027	12-16	
Apr. 9	Coastal Carolina		Clay Gould Ballpark • Arlington, TX	**L** 7-8	Sharkey (1-1)	**Wong** (1-1)	None	ESPN+	314	12-17	3-4
Apr. 10	Coastal Carolina		Clay Gould Ballpark • Arlington, TX	**W** 7-3	**Bullard** (5-2)	Parker (2-2)	None	ESPN+	314	13-17	4-4
Apr. 11	Coastal Carolina		Clay Gould Ballpark • Arlington, TX	**W** 5-1	**Moffat** (3-1)	Maton (2-3)	**Wong** (4)	ESPN+	314	14-17	5-4
Apr. 13	at Abilene Christian		Crutcher Scott Field • Abilene, TX	**L** 10-11	Huffing (4-0)	**Winquest** (0-4)	Riley (4)		204	14-18	
Apr. 16	at Arkansas State		Tomlinson Stadium–Kell Field • Jonesboro, AR	**W** 7-5	**King** (2-0)	Algee (0-2)	**Wong** (5)	ESPN+	415	15-18	6-4
Apr. 17	at Arkansas State		Tomlinson Stadium–Kell Field • Jonesboro, AR	**W** 9-2	**Bullard** (6-2)	Nash (1-4)	None	ESPN+	356	16-18	7-4
Apr. 18	at Arkansas State		Tomlinson Stadium–Kell Field • Jonesboro, AR	**L** 3-5	Holt (2-2)	**Moffat** (3-2)	Stone (4)	ESPN+	307	16-19	7-5
Apr. 20	at No. 5 TCU		Lupton Stadium • Fort Worth, TX	**L** 1-9	Savage (1-0)	**Bost** (0-1)	None		2,145	16-20	
Apr. 21	Kansas		Clay Gould Ballpark • Arlington, TX	**W** 8-1	**Winquest** (1-4)	Hazelwood (2-2)	None		314	17-20	
Apr. 23	at McNeese State		Joe Miller Ballpark • Lake Charles, LA	**W** 8-1	**Tavera** (1-4)	Dion (4-4)	**King** (1)		412	18-20	
Apr. 24	at McNeese State		Joe Miller Ballpark • Lake Charles, LA	**W** 6-5	**Wong** (2-1)	Brady (1-1)	**Austin** (1)		377	19-20	
Apr. 25	at McNeese State		Joe Miller Ballpark • Lake Charles, LA	**L** 3-5	Ellison (3-2)	**Moffat** (3-3)	Foster (2)		439	19-21	
Apr. 27	No. 5 TCU		Clay Gould Ballpark • Arlington, TX	**L** 3-8	Savage (2-0)	**Winquest** (1-5)	None		314	19-22	

May (6–7)
Date	Opponent	Rank	Site/stadium	Score	Win	Loss	Save	TV	Attendance	Overall record	SBC record
May 1	Little Rock		Clay Gould Ballpark • Arlington, TX	**W** 1-0	**King** (3-0)	Evans (1-2)	None	ESPN+	314	20-22	8-5
May 2	Little Rock		Clay Gould Ballpark • Arlington, TX	**W** 5-4	**Wong** (3-1)	Barkley (5-3)	**King** (2)	ESPN+	314	21-22	9-5
May 2	Little Rock		Clay Gould Ballpark • Arlington, TX	**W** 3-0	**Moffat** (4-3)	DeCooman (0-3)	**Austin** (2)	ESPN+	314	22-22	10-5
May 4	vs. Texas A&M		Globe Life Field • Arlington, TX	**L** 4-8	Menefee (3-2)	**Brooks** (0-1)	Jozwiak (7)			22-23	
May 7	at Louisiana–Monroe		Warhawk Field • Monroe, LA	**W** 6-1	**Tavera** (2-4)	Barnes (2-5)	None		549	23-23	11-5
May 8	at Louisiana–Monroe		Warhawk Field • Monroe, LA	**L** 1-5	Barlow (6-4)	**Bullard** (6-3)	Orton (5)			23-24	11-6
May 9	at Louisiana–Monroe		Warhawk Field • Monroe, LA	**L** 8-10	Goleman (2-1)	**Moffat** (4-4)	Orton (6)		580	23-25	11-7
May 14	Louisiana		Clay Gould Ballpark • Arlington, TX	**L** 3-4 (15 inns)	Marshall (1-0)	**Brooks** (0-2)	Dixon (1)	ESPN+	314	23-26	11-8
May 15	Louisiana		Clay Gould Ballpark • Arlington, TX	**W** 6-2	**Bullard** (7-3)	Cooke (6-3)	**King** (3)	ESPN+	314	24-26	12-8
May 15	Louisiana		Clay Gould Ballpark • Arlington, TX	**L** 4-7	Marshall (2-0)	**Austin** (1-2)	Talley (7)	ESPN+	314	24-27	12-9
May 18	Stephen F. Austin		Clay Gould Ballpark • Arlington, TX	Game cancelled							
May 20	at Georgia Southern		J. I. Clements Stadium • Statesboro, GA	**W** 5-3	**Norris** (4-3)	Thompson (6-1)	**King** (4)		457	25-27	13-9
May 21	at Georgia Southern		J. I. Clements Stadium • Statesboro, GA	**L** 2-3	Jackson (4-6)	**Bullard** (7-4)	Jones (16)		487	25-28	13-10
May 22	at Georgia Southern		J. Il. Clements Stadium • Statesboro, GA	**L** 3-6	Davis (1-1)	**Moffat** (4-5)	Jones (17)		529	25-29	13-11

Postseason (2–1)

SBC Tournament (2–1)
Date	Opponent	Seed/Rank	Site/stadium	Score	Win	Loss	Save	TV	Attendance	Overall record	Tournament record
May 27	vs. (5W) Arkansas State	(2W)	Montgomery Riverwalk Stadium • Montgomery, AL	**W** 8-3	**Tavera** (3-4)	Hudson (5-3)	None	ESPN+		26-29	1-0
May 28	vs. (3E) Troy	(2W)	Montgomery Riverwalk Stadium • Montgomery, AL	**W** 11-5	**Seals** (4-0)	Gainous (9-5)	None	ESPN+		27-29	2-0
May 29	vs. (1E) South Alabama	(2W)	Montgomery Riverwalk Stadium • Montgomery, AL	**L** 4-5	Samaniego (2-2)	**Wong** (3-2)	Dalton (4)	ESPN+		27-30	2-1

Schedule source:

*Rankings are based on the team's current ranking in the D1Baseball poll.

== Postseason ==
=== Conference accolades ===
- Player of the Year: Mason McWhorter – GASO
- Pitcher of the Year: Hayden Arnold – LR
- Freshman of the Year: Garrett Gainous – TROY
- Newcomer of the Year: Drake Osborn – LA
- Coach of the Year: Mark Calvi – USA

All Conference First Team

- Connor Cooke (LA)
- Hayden Arnold (LR)
- Carlos Tavera (UTA)
- Nick Jones (GASO)
- Drake Osborn (LA)
- Robbie Young (APP)
- Luke Drumheller (APP)
- Drew Frederic (TROY)
- Ben Klutts (ARST)
- Mason McWhorter (GASO)
- Logan Cerny (TROY)
- Ethan Wilson (USA)
- Cameron Jones (GSU)
- Ben Fitzgerald (LA)

All Conference Second Team

- JoJo Booker (USA)
- Tyler Tuthill (APP)
- Jeremy Lee (USA)
- Aaron Barkley (LR)
- BT Riopelle (CCU)
- Dylan Paul (UTA)
- Travis Washburn (ULM)
- Eric Brown (CCU)
- Grant Schulz (ULM)
- Tyler Duncan (ARST)
- Parker Chavers (CCU)
- Josh Smith (GSU)
- Andrew Miller (UTA)
- Noah Ledford (GASO)
