= 2021 Louisiana–Monroe Warhawks baseball team =

American college baseball season

2021 Louisiana–Monroe Warhawks baseball
- Conference: Sun Belt Conference
- West Division
- Record: 26–26 (11–13 SBC)
- Head coach: Michael Federico (4th season)
- Assistant coaches: Matt Collins; Jake Carlson; Brandon Belanger
- Home stadium: Warhawk Field

2021 Sun Belt Conference baseball standings
	Conf.				Overall
Team	W		L	PCT	W		L	PCT
East Division
South Alabama ^{x}‍‍‡‍^{y}	15	–	9	.625	36	–	22	.621
Georgia Southern ‍‍‍	14	–	10	.583	34	–	23	.596
Troy ‍‍‍	13	–	11	.542	27	–	26	.509
Appalachian State ‍‍‍	11	–	10	.524	21	–	31	.404
Georgia State ‍‍‍	12	–	12	.500	18	–	37	.327
Coastal Carolina ‍‍‍	9	–	12	.429	27	–	24	.529
West Division
Louisiana ^{x}‍‍‍	13	–	11	.542	32	–	23	.582
UT Arlington ‍‍‍	13	–	11	.542	27	–	30	.474
Louisiana–Monroe ‍‍‍	11	–	13	.458	26	–	26	.500
Little Rock ‍‍‍	11	–	13	.458	21	–	30	.412
Arkansas State ‍‍‍	10	–	14	.417	19	–	30	.388
Texas State ‍‍‍	9	–	15	.375	21	–	36	.368
x – Division champion ‡ – Tournament champion y – Invited to the NCAA tournament As of June 7, 2021; Rankings from D1Baseball

The 2021 Louisiana–Monroe Warhawks baseball team represented the University of Louisiana at Monroe during the 2021 NCAA Division I baseball season. The Warhawks played their home games at Warhawk Field and were led by fourth-year head coach Michael Federico. They were members of the Sun Belt Conference.

== Preseason ==
=== Signing Day Recruits ===
Player	Hometown	Previous Team
Pitchers
Cole Brady	Nacogdoches, Texas	Central Heights HS
Mikel Howell	Huntsville, Texas	Northeast Texas CC
Lane Little	Calhoun, Louisiana	West Monroe HS
Turner Toms	Benton, Louisiana	Chipola College

=== Sun Belt Conference Coaches Poll ===
The Sun Belt Conference Coaches Poll was released on February 15, 2021 and the Warhawks were picked to finish fifth in the West Division.

Coaches poll (West)
Predicted finish	Team	Votes (1st place)
1	Texas State	65 (6)
2	UT Arlington	58 (4)
3	Louisiana	52 (2)
4	Little Rock	33
5	Louisiana–Monroe	27
6	Arkansas State	13

=== Preseason All-Sun Belt Team & Honors ===
- Aaron Funk (LR, Pitcher)
- Jordan Jackson (GASO, Pitcher)
- Conor Angel (LA, Pitcher)
- Wyatt Divis (UTA, Pitcher)
- Lance Johnson (TROY, Pitcher)
- Caleb Bartolero (TROY, Catcher)
- William Sullivan (TROY, 1st Base)
- Luke Drumheller (APP, 2nd Base)
- Drew Frederic (TROY, Shortstop)
- Cooper Weiss (CCU, 3rd Base)
- Ethan Wilson (USA, Outfielder)
- Parker Chavers (CCU, Outfielder)
- Rigsby Mosley (TROY, Outfielder)
- Eilan Merejo (GSU, Designated Hitter)
- Andrew Beesly (ULM, Utility)

== Roster ==
2021 Louisiana–Monroe Warhawks roster
Pitchers: 18 Cole Martin - Senior; 19 Lucas Wepf - Junior; 21 Ty Barnes - Senior; 26 Bryson Wrobel - Junior; 27 Cole Cressend - Freshman; 32 Tyler Lien - Redshirt Junior; 35 Dawson Linder - Sophomore; 36 Eric Heiman - Junior; 37 Landon Longsworth - Senior; 39 Trey Lindsay - Sophomore; 40 Carson Orton - Redshirt Freshman; 41 Reid Goleman - Sophomore; 42 Nicholas Judice - Freshman; 43 Tylor Jans - Sophomore; 44 Henry Shuffler - Freshman; 46 Adam Tubbs - Freshman; 47 Cam Barlow - Redshirt Freshman; 48 Steve Owings - Sophomore; 49 Jack Englemann - Junior; 50 Justin Barton - Senior	Catchers: 2 Matthew Lee - Freshman; 16 Britt McKay - Sophomore; 33 Logan Wurm - Senior; 34 Chris Noble - Sophomore; Infielders: 4 Jacob Wax - Freshman; 5 Michael Cervantes - Freshman; 6 Carson Jones - Freshman; 9 Colby Deaville - Junior; 10 Grant Schulz - Junior; 22 Wiley Cleland - Junior; 23 Travis Washburn - Sophomore; 29 Danny Desimone - Junior; 51 Landon Cato - Freshman; Outfielders: 1 Justin King - Senior; 3 Andrew Beesley - Senior; 7 Ryan Humeniuk - Senior; 11 Trace Henry - Junior; 20 Mason Holt - Junior; 25 Cole Stromboe - Freshman; 45 Ryan Cupit - Junior

=== Coaching staff ===
2021 Louisiana–Monroe Warhawks coaching staff
- Michael Federico – Head Coach – 4th year
- Matt Collins – Assistant Head Coach – 6th year
- Jake Carlson – Assistant Head Coach/Recruiting Coordinator – 3rd year
- Brandon Belanger – Assistant Coach – 4th year
- Blake Loper – Director of Baseball Operations – 1st

== Schedule and results ==
Legend
	Louisiana–Monroe win
	Louisiana–Monroe loss
	Postponement/Cancelation/Suspensions
**Bold**	Louisiana–Monroe team member

2021 Louisiana–Monroe Warhawks baseball game log
Regular season (26-24)

February (2-2)
Date	Opponent	Rank	Site/stadium	Score	Win	Loss	Save	TV	Attendance	Overall record	SBC record
Feb. 21	SIU Edwardsville		Warhawk Field • Monroe, LA	Cancelled due to threat of freezing rain/sleet/snow in Monroe							
Feb. 21	SIU Edwardsville		Warhawk Field • Monroe, LA	Cancelled due to threat of freezing rain/sleet/snow in Monroe							
Feb. 22	SIU Edwardsville		Warhawk Field • Monroe, LA	Cancelled due to threat of freezing rain/sleet/snow in Monroe							
Feb. 24	Northwestern State		Warhawk Field • Monroe, LA	**W** 5-2	**Barlow** (1-0)	Banes (0-1)	None		344	1-0	
Feb. 26	at New Orleans		Maestri Field at Privateer Park • New Orleans, LA	**L** 6-7	Seroski (1-1)	**Wrobel** (0-1)	Kulivan (3)		271	1-1	
Feb. 27	at New Orleans		Maestri Field at Privateer Park • New Orleans, LA	**L** 4-7	Khachadourian (1-0)	**Lindsay** (0-1)	Kulivan (4)		349	1-2	
Feb. 28	at New Orleans		Maestri Field at Privateer Park • New Orleans, LA	**W** 7-2	**Lien** (1-0)	Holstein (0-1)	None		344	2-2	

March (8-9)
Date	Opponent	Rank	Site/stadium	Score	Win	Loss	Save	TV	Attendance	Overall record	SBC record
Mar. 3	Grambling State		Warhawk Field • Monroe, LA	**W** 9-1	**Barlow** (2-0)	Riley (0-1)	None		296	3-2	
Mar. 5	Nicholls		Warhawk Field • Monroe, LA	**L** 2-5	Gearing (1-1)	**Barnes** (0-1)	Taylor (2)		684	3-3	
Mar. 6	Nicholls		Warhawk Field • Monroe, LA	**W** 5-3	**Lindsay** (1-1)	Kilcrease (0-1)	**Orton** (1)		684	4-3	
Mar. 7	Nicholls		Warhawk Field • Monroe, LA	**W** 6-4	**Lien** (2-0)	Desandro (1-1)	**Goleman** (1)		623	5-3	
Mar. 9	Louisiana Tech		Warhawk Field • Monroe, LA	**L** 3-10	Martinez (2-0)	**Longsworth** (0-1)	None		1,100	5-4	
Mar. 12	at No. 4 Ole Miss		Swayze Field • Oxford, MS	**L** 1-10	Hoglund (2-0)	**Barlow** (2-1)	None	SECN+	6,217	5-5	
Mar. 13	at No. 4 Ole Miss		Swayze Field • Oxford, MS	**L** 5-6	Broadway (3-0)	**Goleman** (0-1)	None	SECN+	6,577	5-6	
Mar. 14	at No. 4 Ole Miss		Swayze Field • Oxford, MS	**W** 8-3	**Wrobel** (1-1)	Diamond (1-2)	None	SECN+	6,266	6-6	
Mar. 16	vs. No. 14 Oklahoma State		Globe Life Field • Arlington, TX	**W** 13-6	**Judice** (1-0)	Walker (0-1)	None		405	7-6	
Mar. 19	Georgia State		Warhawk Field • Monroe, LA	**L** 3-4	Watson (2-2)	**Barlow** (2-2)	Brandon (1)	ESPN+	358	7-7	0-1
Mar. 20	Georgia State		Warhawk Field • Monroe, LA	**W** 3-1	**Barnes** (1-1)	Jones (0-3)	**Wepf** (1)	ESPN+	518	8-7	1-1
Mar. 21	Georgia State		Warhawk Field • Monroe, LA	**W** 9-7	**Lien** (3-0)	Dawson (0-1)	**Lindsay** (1)		540	9-7	2-1
Mar. 23	at No. 23 Louisiana Tech		J. C. Love Field at Pat Patterson Park • Ruston, LA	**L** 7-9	Follis (1-1)	**Orton** (0-1)	Griffen (1)		1,000	9-8	
Mar. 26	at Texas State		Bobcat Ballpark • San Marcos, TX	**W** 6-5	**Barlow** (3-2)	Leigh (0-4)	**Orton** (2)	ESPN+	755	10-8	3-1
Mar. 27	at Texas State		Bobcat Ballpark • San Marcos, TX	**L** 5-6 (10 inns)	Stivors (1-1)	**Martin** (0-1)	None	ESPN+	733	10-9	3-2
Mar. 28	at Texas State		Bobcat Ballpark • San Marcos, TX	**L** 1-4	Herrmann (3-0)	**Wrobel** (1-2)	Stivors (3)	ESPN+	712	10-10	3-3
Mar. 30	at Grambling State		Ralph Waldo Emerson Jones Park and Wilbert Ellis Field • Grambling, LA	**L** 3-15	Valerio (2-1)	**Cressend** (0-1)	None		50	10-11	

April (8-9)
Date	Opponent	Rank	Site/stadium	Score	Win	Loss	Save	TV	Attendance	Overall record	SBC record
Apr. 1	Louisiana		Warhawk Field • Monroe, LA	**L** 5-9	Arrighetti (5-1)	**Barnes** (1-2)	None	ESPN+	694	10-12	3-4
Apr. 2	Louisiana		Warhawk Field • Monroe, LA	**L** 2-5	Cooke (3-2)	**Barlow** (3-3)	Talley (4)	ESPN+	676	10-13	3-5
Apr. 3	Louisiana		Warhawk Field • Monroe, LA	**L** 9-11	Christie (1-0)	**Lindsay** (1-2)	None	ESPN+	617	10-14	3-6
Apr. 6	at Alabama		Sewell–Thomas Stadium • Tuscaloosa, AL	Game Cancelled							
Apr. 7	at Alabama		Sewell–Thomas Stadium • Tuscaloosa, AL	**W** 5-3	**Lindsay** (2-2)	Hitt (1-3)	**Orton** (3)	SECN+	1,764	11-14	
Apr. 9	at Georgia Southern		J. I. Clements Stadium • Statesboro, GA	**L** 3-4	Owens (4-0)	**Longsworth** (0-2)	Jones (8)	ESPN+	617	11-15	3-7
Apr. 10	at Georgia Southern		J. I. Clements Stadium • Statesboro, GA	**L** 1-4	Dollander (4-1)	**Barlow** (3-4)	Jones (9)	ESPN+	647	11-16	3-8
Apr. 11	at Georgia Southern		J. I. Clements Stadium • Statesboro, GA	**L** 1-7	Jackson (2-4)	**Lien** (3-1)	None	ESPN+	573	11-17	3-9
Apr. 13	Jackson State		Warhawk Field • Monroe, LA	Game Postponed							
Apr. 17	Little Rock		Warhawk Field • Monroe, LA	**L** 0-2	Arnold (5-3)	**Barnes** (1-3)	Barkley (5)		618	11-18	3-10
Apr. 18	Little Rock		Warhawk Field • Monroe, LA	**W** 5-3	**Barlow** (4-4)	Funk (1-4)	**Lindsay** (2)		578	12-18	4-10
Apr. 19	Little Rock		Warhawk Field • Monroe, LA	**W** 5-4 (10 inns)	**Goleman** (1-1)	Barkley (5-2)	None		494	13-18	5-10
Apr. 20	at LSU		Alex Box Stadium, Skip Bertman Field • Baton Rouge, LA	**L** 0-5	Hellmers (6-1)	**Lien** (3-2)	None	SECN+	3,503	13-19	
Apr. 21	Jackson State		Warhawk Field • Monroe, LA	**W** 18-6	**Owings** (1-0)	Jackson (0-1)	None		652	14-19	
Apr. 23	Southern		Warhawk Field • Monroe, LA	**W** 12-1	**Barnes** (2-3)	Guienze (0-4)	None		478	15-19	
Apr. 24	Southern		Warhawk Field • Monroe, LA	**W** 2-0	**Barlow** (5-4)	Bohannon (1-3)	**Lindsay** (3)		516	16-19	
Apr. 25	Southern		Warhawk Field • Monroe, LA	**W** 11-1 (7 inns)	**Martin** (1-1)	Battaglia (3-3)	**Wepf** (2)		516	17-19	
Apr. 27	at Louisiana		M. L. Tigue Moore Field at Russo Park • Lafayette, LA	**W** 7-6	**Longsworth** (1-2)	Christie (1-2)	**Wepf** (3)		567	18-19	
Apr. 30	at Appalachian State		Beaver Field at Jim and Bettie Smith Stadium • Boone, NC	**L** 4-6	Tuthill (3-4)	**Barnes** (2-4)	Hall (2)	ESPN+	205	18-20	5-11

May (8–4)
Date	Opponent	Rank	Site/stadium	Score	Win	Loss	Save	TV	Attendance	Overall record	SBC record
May 1	at Appalachian State		Beaver Field at Jim and Bettie Smith Stadium • Boone, NC	**W** 10-7	**Jans** (1-0)	Hall (5-1)	**Orton** (4)	ESPN+	210	19-20	6-11
May 2	at Appalachian State		Beaver Field at Jim and Bettie Smith Stadium • Boone, NC	**W** 13-5 (8 inns)	**Longsworth** (2-2)	Tujetsch (0-4)	None	ESPN+	200	20-20	7-11
May 5	at Jackson State		Braddy Field • Jackson, MS	**L** 2-4	Becerra (7-1)	**Wrobel** (1-3)	Davila (6)		79	20-21	
May 7	UT Arlington		Warhawk Field • Monroe, LA	**L** 1-6	Tavera (2-4)	**Barnes** (2-5)	None	ESPN+	549	20-22	7-12
May 8	UT Arlington		Warhawk Field • Monroe, LA	**W** 5-1	**Barlow** (6-4)	Bullard (6-3)	**Orton** (5)		580	21-22	8-12
May 8	UT Arlington		Warhawk Field • Monroe, LA	**W** 10-8	**Goleman** (2-1)	Moffat (4-4)	**Orton** (6)		580	22-22	9-12
May 14	at No. 6 TCU		Lupton Stadium • Fort Worth, TX	**W** 4-3	**Barlow** (7-4)	Smith (6-2)	**Orton** (7)	ESPN+	2,199	23-22	
May 15	at No. 6 TCU		Lupton Stadium • Fort Worth, TX	**W** 13-9	**Wepf** (1-0)	Krob (7-1)	None	ESPN+	2,041	24-22	
May 15	at No. 6 TCU		Lupton Stadium • Fort Worth, TX	**L** 4-6	Ridings (3-1)	**Cressend** (0-2)	Green (10)	ESPN+	2,192	24-23	
May 20	at Arkansas State		Tomlinson Stadium–Kell Field • Jonesboro, AR	**L** 6-12	Hudson (5-2)	**Barlow** (7-5)	None	ESPN+	343	24-24	9-13
May 21	at Arkansas State		Tomlinson Stadium–Kell Field • Jonesboro, AR	**W** 10-7	**Wepf** (2-0)	Nash (3-6)	**Orton** (8)	ESPN+	557	25-24	10-13
May 22	at Arkansas State		Tomlinson Stadium–Kell Field • Jonesboro, AR	**W** 6-4	**Lien** (4-2)	Jeans (1-4)	**Orton** (9)	ESPN+	417	26-24	11-13

Postseason (0–2)

SBC Tournament (0–2)
Date	Opponent	Seed/Rank	Site/stadium	Score	Win	Loss	Save	TV	Attendance	Overall record	Tournament record
May 25	vs. (5E) Georgia State	(3W)	Montgomery Riverwalk Stadium • Montgomery, AL	**L** 6-9	Watson (4-4)	**Orton** (0-2)	Horton (1)	ESPN+		26-25	0-1
May 28	vs. (2E) Georgia Southern	(3W)	Montgomery Riverwalk Stadium • Montgomery, AL	**L** 5-9	Bruce (1-0)	**Lien** (4-3)	None	ESPN+		26-26	0-2

Schedule source:

*Rankings are based on the team's current ranking in the D1Baseball poll.

== Postseason ==
=== Conference accolades ===
- Player of the Year: Mason McWhorter – GASO
- Pitcher of the Year: Hayden Arnold – LR
- Freshman of the Year: Garrett Gainous – TROY
- Newcomer of the Year: Drake Osborn – LA
- Coach of the Year: Mark Calvi – USA

All Conference First Team

- Connor Cooke (LA)
- Hayden Arnold (LR)
- Carlos Tavera (UTA)
- Nick Jones (GASO)
- Drake Osborn (LA)
- Robbie Young (APP)
- Luke Drumheller (APP)
- Drew Frederic (TROY)
- Ben Klutts (ARST)
- Mason McWhorter (GASO)
- Logan Cerny (TROY)
- Ethan Wilson (USA)
- Cameron Jones (GSU)
- Ben Fitzgerald (LA)

All Conference Second Team

- JoJo Booker (USA)
- Tyler Tuthill (APP)
- Jeremy Lee (USA)
- Aaron Barkley (LR)
- BT Riopelle (CCU)
- Dylan Paul (UTA)
- Travis Washburn (ULM)
- Eric Brown (CCU)
- Grant Schulz (ULM)
- Tyler Duncan (ARST)
- Parker Chavers (CCU)
- Josh Smith (GSU)
- Andrew Miller (UTA)
- Noah Ledford (GASO)
