= Logan Cerny =

American baseball player (born 1999)

Free agent
- Outfielder
- Born: September 28, 1999 (age 26); Decatur, Georgia, U.S.
- Bats: Right Throws: Right
- Stats at Baseball Reference

Logan James Cerny (born September 28, 1999) is an American professional baseball outfielder who is a free agent.

== Career ==
=== Amateur ===
Cerny grew up in Lawrenceville, Georgia, and attended Parkview High School. As a senior, Cerny was named the GHSAA 7A Player of the Year and a MaxPreps All-American after he batted .397 with four triples, 10 home runs, 34 RBI, and 43 runs scored as Parkview won the GHSAA 7A state championship.

Cerny played college baseball career at Troy for three seasons. As a freshman, he hit for a .267 average with nine home runs and 42 RBI. Cerny's sophomore season was cut short due to the coronavirus pandemic. As a junior, Cerny was named first team All-Sun Belt Conference after he batted .332 with 17 doubles, four triples, and 15 home runs with 49 runs scored and 47 RBI.

=== Philadelphia Phillies ===
Cerny was drafted in the 10th round, with the 295th overall selection, by the Philadelphia Phillies in the 2021 Major League Baseball draft. He was assigned to the Rookie-level Florida Complex League Phillies to start his professional career before being promoted to the Low-A Clearwater Threshers.

=== Houston Astros ===
Cerny was traded to the Houston Astros in exchange for catcher Garrett Stubbs on November 19, 2021. The Astros assigned Cerny to the Single-A Fayetteville Woodpeckers at the beginning of the 2022 season, for whom he batted .253/.360/.472 with 15 home runs, 54 RBI, and 35 stolen bases.

Cerny made 84 appearances for the High-A Asheville Tourists in 2023, slashing .221/.297/.380 with 13 home runs, 42 RBI, and 20 stolen bases. He split the 2024 season between Asheville and the Double-A Corpus Christi Hooks. In 106 appearances for the two affiliates, Cerny hit .211/.301/.394 with a career-high 16 home runs, 45 RBI, and 32 stolen bases.

Cerny made 48 appearances for Double-A Corpus Christi in 2025, batting .168/.247/.231 with two home runs, six RBI, and seven stolen bases. Cerny was released by the Astros organization on June 23, 2025.
