= Ethan Wilson =

American baseball player (born 1999)

Southern Maryland Blue Crabs – No. 3
- Outfielder
- Born: November 7, 1999 (age 26); Andalusia, Alabama
- Bats: Left Throws: Left

Ethan Wilson (born November 7, 1999) is an American professional baseball outfielder for the Southern Maryland Blue Crabs. He played college baseball for the South Alabama Jaguars. He was drafted by the Phillies in the second round of the 2021 Major League Baseball draft.

== Amateur career ==
Wilson grew up in Andalusia, Alabama and attended Andalusia High School. He played baseball while still in eighth grade and was the starting quarterback on the football team. As a senior, he was named the Class 4A Player of the Year after batting .529 with 10 home runs, 41 RBIs and 51 runs scored and went 12-0 with a 0.65 ERA and 112 strikeouts in 62 innings as Andalusia won the Class 4A State Championship. In football, Wilson passed 2,388 yards and 29 touchdowns and rushed for 783 yards and 12 touchdowns and was named second team All-State.

Wilson was named the Sun Belt Conference Player of the Year and the Freshman of the Year after hitting .345/.453/.636 with 17 homer runs and 51 RBIs. He was named the national co-Freshman of the Year by the Collegiate Baseball Newspaper. Wilson batted .282 with three home runs and 12 RBIs in 18 games before the season ended early due to the COVID-19 pandemic. Wilson was named first team All-Sun Belt in 2021 after hitting .318 with 13 doubles, four triples, eight home runs, 34 RBIs and 33 walks.

== Professional career ==
Wilson was selected in the second round with the 49th overall pick in the 2021 Major League Baseball draft by the Philadelphia Phillies. He signed with the Phillies for a $1.5 million bonus on July 17. Wilson underwent an appendectomy during spring training in 2024. That season, he reached Triple-A for the first time. The Phillies released Wilson on March 21, 2025.

Wilson signed with the Southern Maryland Blue Crabs of the independent Atlantic League in April 2025.
