= Eddie Stanky Field =

Baseball park in Mobile, Alabama, United States

- Stanky Field

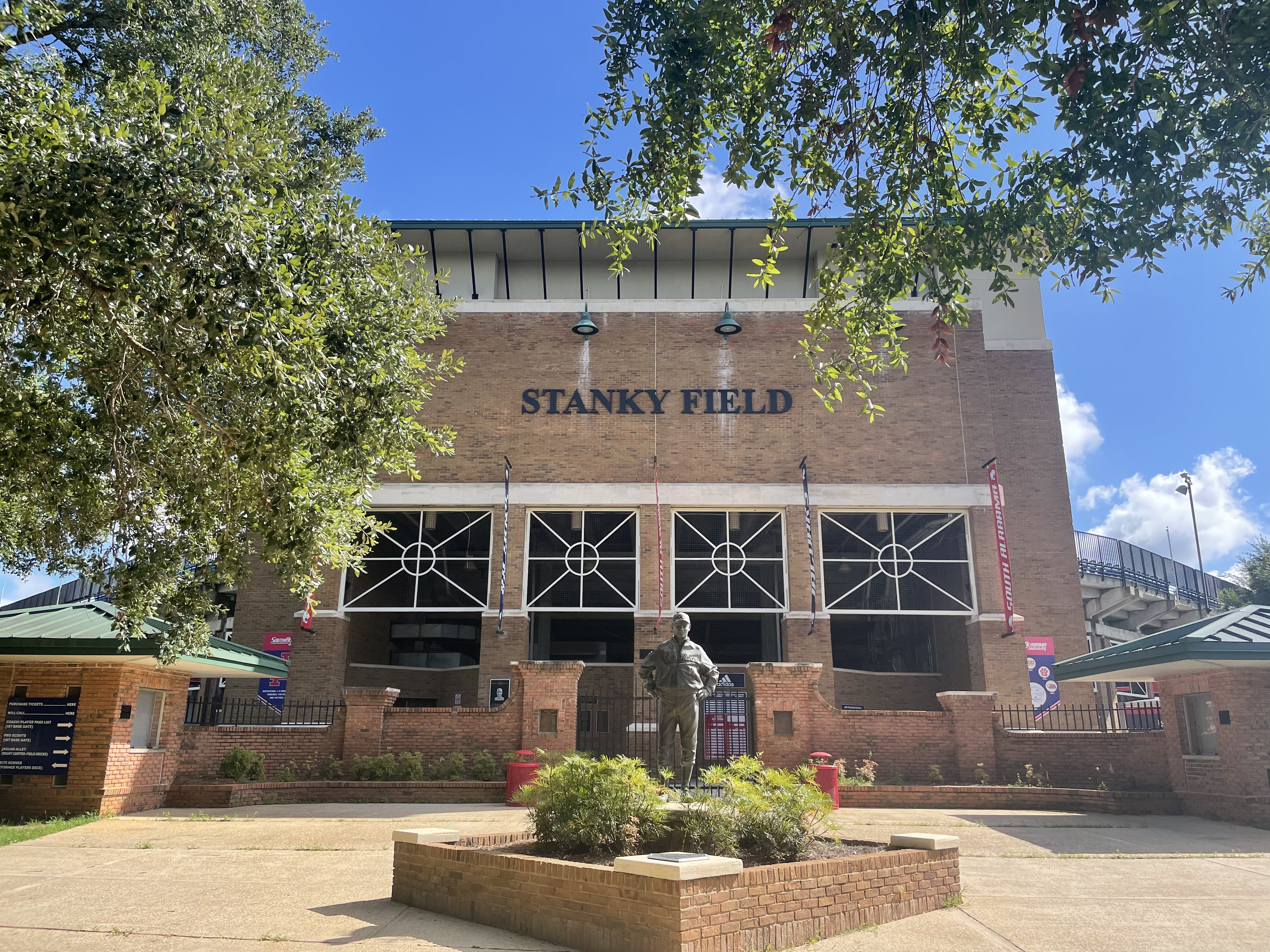
- Interactive map of Eddie Stanky Field
- Location: 307 North University Boulevard; Mobile, Alabama 36608
- Coordinates: 30.69138°N 88.18444°W
- Owner: University of South Alabama
- Operator: University of South Alabama
- Capacity: 3,775
- Surface: Turf
- Record attendance: 4,508 (Auburn, February 12th, 2008)
- Field size: Left Field: 330 ft (100 m); Left-Center Field: 375 ft (114 m); Center Field: 400 ft (120 m); Right-Center Field: 375 ft (114 m); Right Field: 330 ft (100 m)

Construction
- Opened: 1980; 46 years ago
- Renovated: 2004; 22 years ago

Tenants
- Mobile BaySharks (CBL) (1994–1995); University of South Alabama Jaguars baseball team (1980–present)

Website
- Stanky Field

Eddie Stanky Field is a baseball park in Mobile, Alabama. During the 1990s, it was the home of the Mobile BaySharks. It is currently home to the South Alabama Jaguars baseball team and was home to the 2007 Sun Belt Conference baseball tournament. The ballpark has a capacity of 3,775 people.

In 2013, the Jaguars ranked 41st among Division I baseball programs in attendance, averaging 1,537 per home game.

== See also ==
- List of NCAA Division I baseball venues
