= 2021 Georgia Southern Eagles baseball team =

American college baseball season

2021 Georgia Southern Eagles baseball

SBC Tournament Pool B champions
- Conference: Sun Belt Conference
- East Division
- Record: 34–23 (14–10 SBC)
- Head coach: Rodney Hennon (21st season)
- Assistant coaches: B. J. Green; Alan Beck
- Home stadium: J. I. Clements Stadium

2021 Sun Belt Conference baseball standings
	Conf.				Overall
Team	W		L	PCT	W		L	PCT
East Division
South Alabama ^{x}‍‍‡‍^{y}	15	–	9	.625	36	–	22	.621
Georgia Southern ‍‍‍	14	–	10	.583	34	–	23	.596
Troy ‍‍‍	13	–	11	.542	27	–	26	.509
Appalachian State ‍‍‍	11	–	10	.524	21	–	31	.404
Georgia State ‍‍‍	12	–	12	.500	18	–	37	.327
Coastal Carolina ‍‍‍	9	–	12	.429	27	–	24	.529
West Division
Louisiana ^{x}‍‍‍	13	–	11	.542	32	–	23	.582
UT Arlington ‍‍‍	13	–	11	.542	27	–	30	.474
Louisiana–Monroe ‍‍‍	11	–	13	.458	26	–	26	.500
Little Rock ‍‍‍	11	–	13	.458	21	–	30	.412
Arkansas State ‍‍‍	10	–	14	.417	19	–	30	.388
Texas State ‍‍‍	9	–	15	.375	21	–	36	.368
x – Division champion ‡ – Tournament champion y – Invited to the NCAA tournament As of June 7, 2021; Rankings from D1Baseball

The 2021 Georgia Southern Eagles baseball team represented Georgia Southern Eagles during the 2021 NCAA Division I baseball season. The Eagles played their home games at J. I. Clements Stadium and were led by twenty-first year head coach Rodney Hennon. They were members of the Sun Belt Conference.

== Preseason ==
=== Signing Day Recruits ===
Player	Hometown	Previous Team
Pitchers
Brayden Collett	Evans, Georgia	Greenbrier HS
Rem Maxwell	Winder, Georgia	Jefferson County HS
Will Robbins	Cumming, Georgia	Forsyth Central HS
Brett Zerbel	Augusta, Georgia	Augusta Christian
Pax Briley III	Suwanee, Georgia	North Gwinnett HS
Declan Dun	Peachtree City, Georgia	Starr's Mill HS
Hitters
Blake Chapman	Simsbury, Connecticut	Elev8 Sports Institute
Garrett Carter	McDonough, Georgia	Ola HS
Preston Gunnell	Canton, Georgia	Woodstock HS
Sean White	Peachtree City, Georgia	Starr's Mill HS
JB Bell	Buford, Georgia	Flowery Branch HS
Carson Mynatt	Canton, Georgia	Cherokee HS

=== Sun Belt Conference Coaches Poll ===
The Sun Belt Conference Coaches Poll was released on February 15, 2021 and the Eagles were picked to finish third in the East Division with 51 votes.

Coaches poll (East)
Predicted finish	Team	Votes (1st place)
1	Coastal Carolina	69 (10)
2	South Alabama	51 (1)
3	Georgia Southern	51 (1)
4	Troy	44
5	Appalachian State	21
6	Georgia State	16

=== Preseason All-Sun Belt Team & Honors ===
- Aaron Funk (LR, Pitcher)
- Jordan Jackson (GASO, Pitcher)
- Conor Angel (LA, Pitcher)
- Wyatt Divis (UTA, Pitcher)
- Lance Johnson (TROY, Pitcher)
- Caleb Bartolero (TROY, Catcher)
- William Sullivan (TROY, 1st Base)
- Luke Drumheller (APP, 2nd Base)
- Drew Frederic (TROY, Shortstop)
- Cooper Weiss (CCU, 3rd Base)
- Ethan Wilson (USA, Outfielder)
- Parker Chavers (CCU, Outfielder)
- Rigsby Mosley (TROY, Outfielder)
- Eilan Merejo (GSU, Designated Hitter)
- Andrew Beesly (ULM, Utility)

== Personnel ==
=== Roster ===
2021 Georgia Southern Eagles roster
Pitchers: 8 Griffin Davis – Redshirt Junior; 9 Chase Dollander – Freshman; 16 Braden Hays – Junior; 17 Tyler Owens – Senior; 19 Sean Adams – Sophomore; 21 Jonathan Edwards – Junior; 25 Nick Jones – Senior; 26 Jay Thompson – Junior; 27 Rhett Gay – Senior; 29 Tyler Jones – Senior; 32 Jared Szabo – Redshirt Freshman; 33 Jordan Jackson – Senior; 34 Austin Kleinlein – Redshirt Junior; 35 Hayden Harris – Senior; 36 Anthony Dimola – Freshman; 37 David Johnson – Senior; 40 Jacob Parker – Redshirt Senior; 43 Connor Bruce – Sophomore; 45 Ben Johnson – Freshman; 46 Jeremy Gay – Freshman; 47 Jake Martin – Sophomore; 48 Jackson Dyer – Freshman	Catchers: 3 Chandler Davis – Junior; 5 Matt Anderson – Senior; 13 JP Tighe – Junior; 99 Hayden Duffield – Freshman; Infielders: 00 Jarrett Jenkins – Freshman; 2 Jason Swan – Senior; 7 Jack Eichler – Sophomore; 22 Austin Thompson – Senior; 23 Blake Evans – Junior; 28 Noah Ledford – Junior; 30 Steven Curry – Senior; 31 Mitchell Golden – Redshirt Senior; 38 Sam Blancato – Sophomore; 42 Jaylen Paden – Freshman; 44 Jarrett Brown – Sophomore	Outfielders: 4 Mason McWhorter – Senior; 6 Noah Searcy – Senior; 11 Cody Shook – Redshirt Junior; 12 Parker Biederer – Senior; 41 Christian Avant – Senior; 49 J. C. Peacher – Freshman

=== Coaching staff ===
2021 Georgia Southern Eagles coaching staff
- Rodney Hennon – Head Coach – 21st year
- B. J. Green – Assistant Head Coach/Pitching Coach – 11th year
- Alan Beck – Assistant Head Coach/Hitting Coach – 6th year
- Seth Lancaster – Volunteer Assistant Coach – 1st year

== Schedule and results ==
Legend
	Georgia Southern win
	Georgia Southern loss
	Postponement/Cancelation/Suspensions
**Bold**	Georgia Southern team member

2021 Georgia Southern Eagles baseball game log
Regular season (31–22)

February (2–5)
Date	Opponent	Rank	Site/stadium	Score	Win	Loss	Save	TV	Attendance	Overall record	SBC record
Feb. 19	No. 19 Tennessee		J. I. Clements Stadium • Statesboro, GA	**L** 3–5	Dallas (1–0)	**Jackson** (0–1)	Walsh (1)	ESPN+	704	0–1	
Feb. 20	No. 19 Tennessee		J. I. Clements Stadium • Statesboro, GA	**L** 3–5	Redmond (1–0)	**Harris** (0–1)	None	ESPN+	767	0–2	
Feb. 21	No. 19 Tennessee		J. I. Clements Stadium • Statesboro, GA	**L** 3–7 (12 inns)	Hunley (1–0)	**Paden** (0–1)	None	ESPN+	709	0–3	
Feb. 24	at College of Charleston		CofC Baseball Stadium at Patriots Point • Mount Pleasant, SC	**W** 18–7	**Thompson** (1–0)	Cook (0–1)	None		442	1–3	
Feb. 26	No. 22 East Carolina		J. I. Clements Stadium • Statesboro, GA	**L** 4–6	Bridges (1–0)	**Jackson** (0–2)	Colmore (1)		701	1–4	
Feb. 27	No. 22 East Carolina		J. I. Clements Stadium • Statesboro, GA	**W** 10–7	**Johnson** (1–0)	Mayhue (0–1)	**Johnson** (1)		756	2–4	
Feb. 28	No. 22 East Carolina		J. I. Clements Stadium • Statesboro, GA	**L** 2–9	Whisenhunt (1–0)	**Hays** (0–1)	None		762	2–5	

March (10–6)
Date	Opponent	Rank	Site/stadium	Score	Win	Loss	Save	TV	Attendance	Overall record	SBC record
Mar. 3	at North Florida		Harmon Stadium • Jacksonville, FL	**W** 3–1	**Jackson** (1–2)	Santos (0–1)	**Jones** (1)		119	3–5	
Mar. 5	Towson		J. I. Clements Stadium • Statesboro, GA	**W** 5–1	**Johnson** (2–0)	Seils (1–2)	**Hays** (1)		629	4–5	
Mar. 6	Towson		J. I. Clements Stadium • Statesboro, GA	**W** 7–5	**Dollander** (1–0)	Ramanjulu (0–2)	**Jones** (2)		647	5–5	
Mar. 7	Towson		J. I. Clements Stadium • Statesboro, GA	**W** 6–5	**Paden** (1–1)	Santangelo (0–1)	**Jones** (3)		637	6–5	
Mar. 9	No. 7 Georgia		J. I. Clements Stadium • Statesboro, GA	**L** 2–5	Cannon (1–0)	**Jackson** (1–3)	None		850	6–6	
Mar. 12	UAB		J. I. Clements Stadium • Statesboro, GA	**W** 11–7	**Thompson** (2–0)	Taylor (0–1)	**Jones** (4)		732	7–6	
Mar. 13	UAB		J. I. Clements Stadium • Statesboro, GA	**W** 15–4	**Dollander** (2–0)	O'Clair (2–2)	None		527	8–6	
Mar. 14	UAB		J. I. Clements Stadium • Statesboro, GA	**W** 9–5	**Johnson** (1–0)	Knight (1–1)	**Jones** (5)		643	9–6	
Mar. 17	at No. 12 Georgia Tech		Russ Chandler Stadium • Atlanta, GA	Game Postponed							
Mar. 19	at Troy		Riddle–Pace Field • Troy, AL	**W** 8–1	**Owens** (1–0)	Ortiz (2–2)	None		809	10–6	1–0
Mar. 20	at Troy		Riddle–Pace Field • Troy, AL	**L** 8–11	Gainous (3–1)	**Dollander** (2–1)	None		1,057	10–7	1–1
Mar. 21	at Troy		Riddle–Pace Field • Troy, AL	**L** 4–8	Witcher (3–1)	**Johnson** (1–1)	Pettys (1)		831	10–8	1–2
Mar. 23	vs. Clemson		SRP Park • North Augusta, SC	**L** 4–6	Clayton (2–0)	**Parker** (0–1)	None		1,498	10–9	
Mar. 26	Appalachian State		J. I. Clements Stadium • Statesboro, GA	**W** 3–1	**Owens** (2–0)	Tuthill (2–3)	**Jones** (6)		779	11–9	2–2
Mar. 27	Appalachian State		J. I. Clements Stadium • Statesboro, GA	**W** 10–2	**Dollander** (3–1)	Martinez (3–3)	None		735	12–9	3–2
Mar. 28	Appalachian State		J. I. Clements Stadium • Statesboro, GA	**L** 1–3	Hall (4–0)	**Johnson** (1–2)	Ellington (2)		607	12–10	3–3
Mar. 30	College of Charleston		J. I. Clements Stadium • Statesboro, GA	**L** 3–6	Czerwinski (1–0)	**Paden** (1–2)	Williams (2)		637	12–11	

April (13–5)
Date	Opponent	Rank	Site/stadium	Score	Win	Loss	Save	TV	Attendance	Overall record	SBC record
Apr. 1	at Georgia State		GSU Baseball Complex • Decatur, GA	**W** 23–1	**Owens** (3–0)	Watson (2–4)	None	ESPN+	292	13–11	4–3
Apr. 2	at Georgia State		GSU Baseball Complex • Decatur, GA	**L** 6–7 (10 inns)	Horton (1–1)	**Johnson** (1–3)	None	ESPN+	356	13–12	4–4
Apr. 3	at Georgia State		GSU Baseball Complex • Decatur, GA	**W** 2–3	Sweatt (2–1)	**Jackson** (1–4)	None	ESPN+	398	13–13	4–5
Apr. 6	at Georgia		Foley Field • Athens, GA	**W** 2–1	**Hays** (1–1)	Pasqua (1–1)	**Jones** (7)		664	14–13	
Apr. 9	Louisiana–Monroe		J. I. Clements Stadium • Statesboro, GA	**W** 4–3	**Owens** (4–0)	Longsworth (0–2)	**Jones** (2)		617	15–13	5–5
Apr. 10	Louisiana–Monroe		J. I. Clements Stadium • Statesboro, GA	**W** 4–1	**Dollander** (4–1)	Barlow (3–4)	**Jones** (9)		647	16–13	6–5
Apr. 11	Louisiana–Monroe		J. I. Clements Stadium • Statesboro, GA	**W** 7–1	**Jackson** (2–4)	Lien (3–1)	None		573	17–13	7–5
Apr. 13	North Florida		J. I. Clements Stadium • Statesboro, GA	**W** 8–6	**Harris** (1–1)	Madonna (2–2)	**Parker** (1)		546	18–13	
Apr. 14	Mercer		J. I. Clements Stadium • Statesboro, GA	**W** 3–2	**Jones** (1–0)	Sutko (2–2)	None		607	19–13	
Apr. 16	at Coastal Carolina		Springs Brooks Stadium • Conway, SC	**W** 8–2	**Owens** (5–0)	Hopwood (4–2)	None		1,000	20–13	8–5
Apr. 17	at Coastal Carolina		Springs Brooks Stadium • Conway, SC	**W** 8–3	**Hays** (2–1)	Parker (2–3)	**Jones** (10)		1,000	21–13	9–5
Apr. 18	at Coastal Carolina		Springs Brooks Stadium • Conway, SC	**L** 6–8	Sharkey (2–1)	**Jackson** (2–5)	Kreuzer (1)		1,000	21–14	9–6
Apr. 21	at Kennesaw State		Fred Stillwell Stadium • Kennesaw, GA	**W** 11–5	**Thompson** (3–0)	Grogan (3–1)	None		120	22–14	
Apr. 24	at Oklahoma		L. Dale Mitchell Baseball Park • Norman, OK	**W** 4–1	**Owens** (6–0)	Bennett (3–3)	**Jones** (11)		724	23–14	
Apr. 24	at Oklahoma		L. Dale Mitchell Baseball Park • Norman, OK	**W** 3–2	**Johnson** (2–3)	Taggart (1–5)	**Thompson** (1)		725	24–14	
Apr. 25	at Oklahoma		L. Dale Mitchell Baseball Park • Norman, OK	**L** 4–14	Ruffcorn (3–1)	**Jackson** (2–6)	None		613	24–15	
Apr. 27	Jacksonville		J. I. Clements Stadium • Statesboro, GA	**W** 4–3	**Thompson** (4–0)	Graham (0–2)	**Jones** (12)		529	25–15	
Apr. 30	South Alabama		J. I. Clements Stadium • Statesboro, GA	**L** 5–12	Smith (4–0)	**Harris** (1–2)	None		769	25–16	9–7

May (6–6)
Date	Opponent	Rank	Site/stadium	Score	Win	Loss	Save	TV	Attendance	Overall record	SBC record
May 1	South Alabama		J. I. Clements Stadium • Statesboro, GA	**W** 11–2	**Thompson** (5–0)	Boswell (2–2)	None		673	26–16	10–7
May 2	South Alabama		J. I. Clements Stadium • Statesboro, GA	**W** 7–6	**Thompson** (6–0)	Dalton (4–3)	**Jones** (13)		639	27–16	11–7
May 7	at Arkansas State		Tomlinson Stadium–Kell Field • Jonesboro, AR	**L** 1–6	Hudson (4–1)	**Owens** (6–1)	None		346	27–17	11–8
May 8	at Arkansas State		Tomlinson Stadium–Kell Field • Jonesboro, AR	**L** 0–4	Nash (3–4)	**Dollander** (4–2)	Jumper (4)			27–18	11–9
May 8	at Arkansas State		Tomlinson Stadium–Kell Field • Jonesboro, AR	**W** 3–2	**Jackson** (3–6)	Holt (3–3)	**Jones** (14)		457	28–18	12–9
May 11	Kennesaw State		J. I. Clements Stadium • Statesboro, GA	Game cancelled							
May 13	at Elon		Walter C. Latham Park • Elon, NC	**L** 5–8	Edgington (3–3)	**Owens** (6–2)	Sprake (5)		65	28–19	
May 14	at Elon		Walter C. Latham Park • Elon, NC	**L** 4–6	Simon (1–4)	**Dollander** (4–3)	Sprake (6)		65	28–20	
May 15	at Elon		Walter C. Latham Park • Elon, NC	**W** 7–5	**Harris** (2–2)	Evans (0–1)	**Jones** (15)		65	29–20	
May 18	at Mercer		OrthoGeorgia Park • Macon, GA	**L** 1–5	Jackson (3–3)	**Davis** (0–1)	Sutko (12)		478	29–21	
May 20	UT Arlington		J. I. Clements Stadium • Statesboro, GA	**L** 3–5	Norris (4–3)	**Thompson** (6–1)	King (4)		457	29–22	12–10
May 21	UT Arlington		J. I. Clements Stadium • Statesboro, GA	**W** 3–2	**Jackson** (4–6)	Bullard (7–4)	**Jones** (16)		487	30–22	13–10
May 22	UT Arlington		J. I. Clements Stadium • Statesboro, GA	**W** 6–3	**Davis** (1–1)	Moffat (4–5)	**Jones** (17)		529	31–22	14–10

Postseason (3–1)

SBC Tournament (3–1)
Date	Opponent	Seed/Rank	Site/stadium	Score	Win	Loss	Save	TV	Attendance	Overall record	Tournament record
May 26	vs. (5E) Georgia State	(2E)	Montgomery Riverwalk Stadium • Montgomery, AL	**W** 10–1	**Owens** (7–2)	Jones (1–8)	None	ESPN+		32–22	1–0
May 28	vs. (3W) Louisiana–Monroe	(2E)	Montgomery Riverwalk Stadium • Montgomery, AL	**W** 9–5	**Bruce** (1–0)	Lien (4–3)	None	ESPN+		33–22	2–0
May 29	vs. (1W) Louisiana	(2E)	Montgomery Riverwalk Stadium • Montgomery, AL	**W** 3–2 (11 inns)	**Thompson** (7–1)	Arrighetti (8–6)	None	ESPN+		34–22	3–0
May 30	vs. (1E) South Alabama	(2E)	Montgomery Riverwalk Stadium • Montgomery, AL	**L** 4–10	Smith (6–1)	**Harris** (2–3)	None	ESPN+	3,162	34–23	3–1

Schedule source:

*Rankings are based on the team's current ranking in the D1Baseball poll.

== Postseason ==
=== Conference accolades ===
- Player of the Year: Mason McWhorter – GASO
- Pitcher of the Year: Hayden Arnold – LR
- Freshman of the Year: Garrett Gainous – TROY
- Newcomer of the Year: Drake Osborn – LA
- Coach of the Year: Mark Calvi – USA

All Conference First Team

- Connor Cooke (LA)
- Hayden Arnold (LR)
- Carlos Tavera (UTA)
- Nick Jones (GASO)
- Drake Osborn (LA)
- Robbie Young (APP)
- Luke Drumheller (APP)
- Drew Frederic (TROY)
- Ben Klutts (ARST)
- Mason McWhorter (GASO)
- Logan Cerny (TROY)
- Ethan Wilson (USA)
- Cameron Jones (GSU)
- Ben Fitzgerald (LA)

All Conference Second Team

- JoJo Booker (USA)
- Tyler Tuthill (APP)
- Jeremy Lee (USA)
- Aaron Barkley (LR)
- BT Riopelle (CCU)
- Dylan Paul (UTA)
- Travis Washburn (ULM)
- Eric Brown (CCU)
- Grant Schulz (ULM)
- Tyler Duncan (ARST)
- Parker Chavers (CCU)
- Josh Smith (GSU)
- Andrew Miller (UTA)
- Noah Ledford (GASO)

== Rankings ==
Ranking movements Legend: ██ Increase in ranking ██ Decrease in ranking — = Not ranked RV = Received votes
	Week																
Poll	Pre	1	2	3	4	5	6	7	8	9	10	11	12	13	14	15	Final
Coaches'	—	—*	—	—	—	—	—	—	—	—	—						
Baseball America	—	—	—	—	—	—	—	—	—	—	—						
Collegiate Baseball^	RV	—	—	—	—	—	—	—	—	—	—						
NCBWA†	RV	—	—	—	—	—	—	—	—	RV	RV						
D1Baseball	—	—	—	—	—	—	—	—	—	—	—						

^ Collegiate Baseball ranked 40 teams in their preseason poll, but only ranked 30 teams weekly during the season.
† NCBWA ranks 30 teams in their preseason poll, but only ranks 25 teams weekly during the season.
* A new poll was not released for this week, so for comparison purposes, the previous week's ranking is inserted in this week's slot.
