= Columbia County Schools =

Columbia County Schools may refer to:

- Columbia County School District, in Lake City, Florida
- Columbia County School System, in Evans, Georgia
