= Evans, Georgia =

- Unincorporated community Census-designated place
- Greenbrier High School in Evans

- Location in Columbia County and the state of Georgia
- Coordinates: 33°32′15″N 82°7′40″W
- Country: United States
- State: Georgia
- County: Columbia

Area
  - Total: 26.55 sq mi (68.77 km^{2})
  - Land: 25.27 sq mi (65.44 km^{2})
  - Water: 1.29 sq mi (3.33 km^{2})
- Elevation: 417 ft (127 m)

Population (2020)
  - Total: 34,536
  - Density: 1,366.9/sq mi (527.75/km^{2})
- Time zone: UTC-5 (Eastern (EST))
  - Summer (DST): UTC-4 (EDT)
- ZIP code: 30809
- Area code: 706
- FIPS code: 13-28044
- GNIS feature ID: 0355729

Evans is an unincorporated community and census-designated place (CDP) in Columbia County, Georgia, United States. It is a suburb of Augusta and is part of the Augusta metropolitan area. As of the 2020 census, Evans had a population of 34,536.

Evans is the de facto county seat of Columbia County, although Appling still holds the de jure designation. The Columbia County Government Center, the Government Complex Addition, and the Columbia County Courthouse Annex are all located in Evans.

== Geography ==
Evans is located in eastern Columbia County, bordered to the northeast by the Savannah River, which forms the South Carolina state line. To the southeast is the town of Martinez. Downtown Augusta is 11 miles (18 km) to the southeast.

The original community of Evans is centered on North Belair Road (SR 383) southwest of Washington Road (SR 104). The community extends west from this point to Gibbs Road and Crawford Creek and south as far as Columbia Road (SR 232), but most of the settled area is north of Washington Road and Evans to Locks Road, extending west as far as Little Kiokee Creek and east to Stevens Creek Dam on the Savannah River.

According to the United States Census Bureau, the CDP has a total area of 26.6 square miles (68.8 km^{2}), of which 25.3 square miles (65.4 km^{2}) is land and 1.3 square miles (3.3 km^{2}), or 4.87%, is water.

== Origin of the name ==
Evans has no relationship to Evans County, Georgia, which is located about 110 miles south of Columbia County and the Evans community. Evans County was named for General Clement A. Evans, but according to an interview with the general's son, Lawton B. Evans, published in the Augusta Chronicle, the community of Evans was not named for his father but for an unrelated family with the same last name.

== Demographics ==
Historical population
Census	Pop.	Note	%±
1990	12,220		—
2000	17,727		45.1%
2010	29,011		63.7%
2020	34,536		19.0%
U.S. Decennial Census; 1850-1870 1870-1880; 1890-1910 1920-1930; 1940 1950 1960; 1970 1980 1990; 2000 2010 2020

Evans first appeared as a census designated place in the 1990 U.S. census.

=== Racial and ethnic composition ===
Evans, Georgia – Racial and ethnic composition Note: the US Census treats Hispanic/Latino as an ethnic category. This table excludes Latinos from the racial categories and assigns them to a separate category. Hispanics/Latinos may be of any race.
Race / Ethnicity (NH = Non-Hispanic)	Pop 2000	Pop 2010	Pop 2020	% 2000	% 2010	% 2020
White alone (NH)	14,478	22,500	24,462	83.20%	77.56%	70.83%
Black or African American alone (NH)	1,785	3,276	4,013	10.07%	11.29%	11.62%
Native American or Alaska Native alone (NH)	39	60	55	0.22%	0.21%	0.16%
Asian alone (NH)	474	1,458	2,235	2.67%	5.03%	6.47%
Pacific Islander alone (NH)	8	23	32	0.05%	0.08%	0.09%
Some Other Race alone (NH)	34	49	183	0.19%	0.17%	0.53%
Mixed Race or Multi-Racial (NH)	243	541	1,664	1.37%	1.86%	4.82%
Hispanic or Latino (any race)	396	1,104	1,892	2.23%	3.81%	5.48%
Total	17,727	29,011	34,536	100.00%	100.00%	100.00%

=== 2020 census ===
As of the 2020 census, Evans had a population of 34,536. The median age was 41.0 years. 25.0% of residents were under the age of 18 and 17.5% of residents were 65 years of age or older. For every 100 females there were 92.7 males, and for every 100 females age 18 and over there were 91.0 males age 18 and over.

95.5% of residents lived in urban areas, while 4.5% lived in rural areas.

There were 11,991 households in Evans, of which 37.6% had children under the age of 18 living in them. Of all households, 67.3% were married-couple households, 10.6% were households with a male householder and no spouse or partner present, and 19.1% were households with a female householder and no spouse or partner present. About 17.6% of all households were made up of individuals and 8.5% had someone living alone who was 65 years of age or older. There were 8,897 families in the CDP.

There were 12,506 housing units, of which 4.1% were vacant. The homeowner vacancy rate was 1.4% and the rental vacancy rate was 6.9%.

Racial composition as of the 2020 census
Race	Number	Percent
White	24,972	72.3%
Black or African American	4,082	11.8%
American Indian and Alaska Native	83	0.2%
Asian	2,255	6.5%
Native Hawaiian and Other Pacific Islander	37	0.1%
Some other race	555	1.6%
Two or more races	2,552	7.4%
Hispanic or Latino (of any race)	1,892	5.5%

== Parks and recreation ==
Columbia County Parks, Recreation & Events operates a number of parks and trails including the Evans Towne Center Park located in the heart of Evans adjacent to The Plaza development project and including the Lady A Pavilion.

The Euchee Creek Greenway is a developing bike and pedestrian project. As of 2023, the trail is open in two sections, with the southern segment consisting of an approximately two-mile section in Grovetown. A separate section is complete to the north, stretching over five miles from the Canterbury Farms subdivision north to Patriots Park. Future plans call for extending the trail further north and east to provide an off-road connection all the way to Savannah Rapids Park, via the existing Evans to Locks Multi-Use Trail.

== Education ==
Evans is served by the Columbia County Public School System.

=== Elementary schools ===
Seventeen public elementary schools serve Evans: Baker Place Elementary, Blue Ridge Elementary, Brookwood Elementary, Cedar Ridge Elementary, Euchee Creek Elementary, Evans Elementary, Greenbrier Elementary, Grovetown Elementary, Lewiston Elementary, Martinez Elementary, North Columbia Elementary, North Harlem Elementary, River Ridge Elementary, Riverside Elementary, South Columbia Elementary, Stevens Creek Elementary, and Westmont Elementary.

=== Middle schools ===
Eight public middle schools serve Evans: Columbia Middle, Evans Middle, Greenbrier Middle, Grovetown Middle, Harlem Middle, Lakeside Middle, Riverside Middle, and Stallings Island Middle.

=== High schools ===
Five public high schools serve Evans: Evans High School, Greenbrier High School, Grovetown High School, Harlem High School, and Lakeside High School.

== Infrastructure ==
Major highways include:

- I-20 (Carl Sanders Highway)
- SR 104 (Washington Road)
- SR 232 (Columbia Road)
- SR 383 (North / South Belair Road)

== Notable people ==
- Ben Hayslip
- Chase Dollander
- Sean Rossini

== See also ==
- Central Savannah River Area
