= D'Ante Smith =

American football player (born 1998)

Profile
- Position: Offensive tackle

Personal information
- Born: June 8, 1998 (age 28); Augusta, Georgia, U.S.
- Listed height: 6 ft 5 in (1.96 m)
- Listed weight: 309 lb (140 kg)

Career information
- High school: Grovetown (Grovetown, Georgia)
- College: East Carolina (2016–2020)
- NFL draft: 2021: 4th round, 139th overall pick

Career history
- Cincinnati Bengals (2021–2024)

Career NFL statistics as of 2023
- Games played: 3
- Games started: 1
- Stats at Pro Football Reference

D'Ante Bryce Smith (born June 8, 1998) is an American professional football offensive tackle. He played college football for the East Carolina Pirates.

== Early life ==
Smith grew up in Augusta, Georgia and attended Grovetown High School, where he was a member of the football and wrestling teams. After being named second-team All-Area and All-Region as a junior, Smith committed to play college football at Appalachian State. During his senior season, he decommitted from Appalachian State and ultimately signed to play at East Carolina.

== College career ==
Smith sustained a season-ending injury in the opening game of his freshman season and used a medical redshirt. Going into his senior year, Smith had started 33 games. Smith suffered an injury in the season opener of his redshirt senior season. He eventually decided to opt out of the remainder of the year and train for the 2021 NFL draft.

== Professional career ==
Pre-draft measurables
Height	Weight	Arm length	Hand span	40-yard dash	10-yard split	20-yard split	20-yard shuttle	Three-cone drill	Vertical jump	Broad jump	Bench press
6 ft 5 3/8 in (1.97 m)	305 lb (138 kg)	35 in (0.89 m)	9 7/8 in (0.25 m)	5.31 s	1.83 s	3.07 s	4.75 s	7.90 s	29.0 in (0.74 m)	9 ft 5 in (2.87 m)	24 reps
All values from Pro Day

Smith was selected in the fourth round with the 139th overall pick of the 2021 NFL draft by the Cincinnati Bengals. He signed his four-year rookie contract with Cincinnati on May 17, 2021. Smith was placed on injured reserve on October 16. He was activated on December 18, ahead of the team's Week 16 matchup against the Denver Broncos.

Smith served as the backup left tackle to Jonah Williams throughout the 2022 season, and carved out a role for himself as the team's swing tackle on running plays that required a sixth offensive lineman.

Smith remained as the backup left tackle for the 2023 season, this time backing up Orlando Brown Jr., who the Bengals had signed in free agency.

Smith missed the 2024 season after tearing a patellar tendon in training camp.
