= 2021 Arkansas State Red Wolves baseball team =

College baseball team

2021 Arkansas State Red Wolves baseball
- Conference: Sun Belt Conference
- West Division
- Record: 19–30 (10–14 SBC)
- Head coach: Tommy Raffo (13th season)
- Assistant coaches: Rick Guarno; Rowdy Hardy
- Home stadium: Tomlinson Stadium–Kell Field

2021 Sun Belt Conference baseball standings
	Conf.				Overall
Team	W		L	PCT	W		L	PCT
East Division
South Alabama ^{x}‍‍‡‍^{y}	15	–	9	.625	36	–	22	.621
Georgia Southern ‍‍‍	14	–	10	.583	34	–	23	.596
Troy ‍‍‍	13	–	11	.542	27	–	26	.509
Appalachian State ‍‍‍	11	–	10	.524	21	–	31	.404
Georgia State ‍‍‍	12	–	12	.500	18	–	37	.327
Coastal Carolina ‍‍‍	9	–	12	.429	27	–	24	.529
West Division
Louisiana ^{x}‍‍‍	13	–	11	.542	32	–	23	.582
UT Arlington ‍‍‍	13	–	11	.542	27	–	30	.474
Louisiana–Monroe ‍‍‍	11	–	13	.458	26	–	26	.500
Little Rock ‍‍‍	11	–	13	.458	21	–	30	.412
Arkansas State ‍‍‍	10	–	14	.417	19	–	30	.388
Texas State ‍‍‍	9	–	15	.375	21	–	36	.368
x – Division champion ‡ – Tournament champion y – Invited to the NCAA tournament As of June 7, 2021; Rankings from D1Baseball

The 2021 Arkansas State Red Wolves baseball team represented Arkansas State University during the 2021 NCAA Division I baseball season. The Red Wolves played their home games at Tomlinson Stadium–Kell Field and were led by thirteenth–year head coach Tommy Raffo. They were members of the Sun Belt Conference.

== Preseason ==
=== Signing Day Recruits ===
Player	Hometown	Previous Team
Pitchers
Sawyer Bentley	Jonesboro, Arkansas	Jonesboro HS
Kyler Carmack	Cabot, Arkansas	Cabot HS
Cooper Pieri	Jonesboro, Arkansas	Gosnell HS
Hitters
Wil French	Jonesboro, Arkansas	Valley View HS
Jackson Harris	Texarkana, Arkansas	Arkansas HS
Ty Gordon	Nashville, Arkansas	Nashville HS
Daedrick Cail	Marion, Arkansas	Marion HS
Dawson Chester	Pocahontas, Arkansas	Pocahontas HS

=== Sun Belt Conference Coaches Poll ===
The Sun Belt Conference Coaches Poll was released on February 15, 2021 and the Red Wolves were picked to finish sixth in the West Division with 13 votes.

Coaches poll (West)
Predicted finish	Team	Votes (1st place)
1	Texas State	65 (6)
2	UT Arlington	58 (4)
3	Louisiana	52 (2)
4	Little Rock	33
5	Louisiana–Monroe	27
6	Arkansas State	13

=== Preseason All-Sun Belt Team & Honors ===
- Aaron Funk (LR, Pitcher)
- Jordan Jackson (GASO, Pitcher)
- Conor Angel (LA, Pitcher)
- Wyatt Divis (UTA, Pitcher)
- Lance Johnson (TROY, Pitcher)
- Caleb Bartolero (TROY, Catcher)
- William Sullivan (TROY, 1st Base)
- Luke Drumheller (APP, 2nd Base)
- Drew Frederic (TROY, Shortstop)
- Cooper Weiss (CCU, 3rd Base)
- Ethan Wilson (USA, Outfielder)
- Parker Chavers (CCU, Outfielder)
- Rigsby Mosley (TROY, Outfielder)
- Eilan Merejo (GSU, Designated Hitter)
- Andrew Beesly (ULM, Utility)

== Roster ==
2021 Arkansas State Red Wolves roster
Pitchers: 13 Walker Williams - Freshman; 16 Brandon Anderson - Senior; 17 Jared Wilson - Senior; 18 Will Nash - Senior; 20 Carter Holt - Junior; 21 Jack Jumper - Senior; 23 Will Gross - Freshman; 24 Max Charlton - Freshman; 25 Phillip Bryant - Redshirt Sophomore; 27 Kollin Stone - Senior; 28 Josh Albat - Sophomore; 29 Max Gehler - Senior; 30 Tyler Jeans - Freshman; 31 Jaden Woolbright - Freshman; 33 Brandon Hudson - Freshman; 35 Andrew McGlynn - Junior; 36 Zech Jarrard - Senior; 37 Will Gilmer - Junior; 39 Jake Algee - Sophomore; 40 Tristan Camp - Sophomore; 41 Bryce Bartlett - Senior'	Catchers: 8 Parker Rowland - Sophomore; 11 Brandon Hager - Freshman; 19 John Hoskyn - Sophomore; Infielders: 3 Garrett Olson - Sophomore; 4 Jared Toler - Freshman; 6 Blake McCutchen - Senior; 9 Ben Klutts - Senior; 10 Jacob Hager - Freshman; 15 Liam Hicks - Senior; 26 Jake Gish - Sophomore; 32 Sky-lar Culver - Senior; 38 Will Huber - Junior; Outfielders: 1 Eli Davis - Junior; 2 Drew Tipton - Senior; 5 Tyler Duncan - Senior; 7 Andrew Leggo - Senior; 12 Brandon Ulmer - Sophomore; 14 Sam Fagan - Freshman; 34 Jaylon Deshazier - Senior

=== Coaching staff ===
2021 Arkansas State Red Wolves coaching staff
- Tommy Raffo – Head Coach – 13th year
- Ricky Guarno – Assistant Head Coach and Recruiting Coordinator – 4th year
- Rowdy Hardy – Assistant Head Coach and Pitching Coach – 4th year
- Zach George – Volunteer Assistant Coach – 1st year

== Schedule and results ==
Legend
	Arkansas State win
	Arkansas State loss
	Postponement/Cancelation/Suspensions
**Bold**	Arkansas State team member

2021 Arkansas State Red Wolves baseball game log
Regular season (18-29)

February (0-3)
Date	Opponent	Rank	Site/stadium	Score	Win	Loss	Save	TV	Attendance	Overall record	SBC record
Feb. 24	at No. 1 Ole Miss		Swayze Field • Oxford, MS	**L** 1-12	McDaniel (1-0)	**Jumper** (0-1)	None	SECN+	2,635	0-1	
Feb. 26	UT Martin		Tomlinson Stadium–Kell Field • Jonesboro, AR	Game canceled due to inclement fog conditions in Jonesboro							
Feb. 27	UT Martin		Tomlinson Stadium–Kell Field • Jonesboro, AR	**L** 5-21	Cannon (1-0)	**Jumper** (0-2)	None		302	0-2	
Feb. 27	UT Martin		Tomlinson Stadium–Kell Field • Jonesboro, AR	**L** 5-8 (5 inns. - Rain)	Wohlbold (1-1)	**Nash** (0-1)	None		302	0-3	

March (5-11)
Date	Opponent	Rank	Site/stadium	Score	Win	Loss	Save	TV	Attendance	Overall record	SBC record
Mar. 2	at Murray State		Reagan Field • Murray, KY	**L** 6-9	Jones (1-0)	**Charlton** (0-1)	Holden (2)		103	0-4	
Mar. 5	at Abilene Christian		Crutcher Scott Field • Abilene, TX	**L** 3-26	Chirpich (2-0)	**Jarrard** (0-1)	None		143	0-5	
Mar. 6	at Abilene Christian		Crutcher Scott Field • Abilene, TX	**L** 5-6 (10 inns.)	Riley (3-0)	**Stone** (0-1)	None		228	0-6	
Mar. 7	at Abilene Christian		Crutcher Scott Field • Abilene, TX	**L** 4-9	Huffling (2-0)	**Anderson** (0-1)	None		238	0-7	
Mar. 9	Missouri State		Tomlinson Stadium–Kell Field • Jonesboro, AR	**W** 10-2	**Nash** (1-1)	Buckner (1-2)	**Jumper** (1)	ESPN+	341	1-7	
Mar. 10	Missouri State		Tomlinson Stadium–Kell Field • Jonesboro, AR	**W** 7-3	**Gilmer** (1-0)	Viertel (0-2)	None	ESPN+	207	2-7	
Mar. 14	at Oklahoma		L. Dale Mitchell Baseball Park • Norman, OK	**W** 15-14	**Williams** (1-0)	Olds (0-2)	**Stone** (1)		729	3-7	
Mar. 14	at Oklahoma		L. Dale Mitchell Baseball Park • Norman, OK	**L** 1-9	Bennett (2-1)	**Holt** (0-1)	None		729	3-8	
Mar. 15	at Oklahoma		L. Dale Mitchell Baseball Park • Norman, OK	**L** 6-12	Abram (1-0)	**Anderson** (0-2)	None		494	3-9	
Mar. 19	at Appalachian State		Beaver Field at Jim and Bettie Smith Stadium • Boone, NC	**L** 4-5	Tuthill (2-2)	**Nash** (1-2)	Hall (2)	ESPN+	220	3-10	0-1
Mar. 20	at Appalachian State		Beaver Field at Jim and Bettie Smith Stadium • Boone, NC	**L** 3-8	Martinez (3-2)	**Holt** (0-2)	None	ESPN+	220	3-11	0-2
Mar. 21	at Appalachian State		Beaver Field at Jim and Bettie Smith Stadium • Boone, NC	**L** 2-12 (7 inns)	Hall (3-0)	**Anderson** (0-3)	None	ESPN+	215	3-12	0-3
Mar. 23	Murray State		Tomlinson Stadium–Kell Field • Jonesboro, AR	**W** 3-1	**Hudson** (1-0)	Gardner (0-4)	**Stone** (2)		188	4-12	
Mar. 26	at Illinois		Duffy Bass Field • Normal, IL	**L** 3-6	Johnson (1-0)	**Charlton** (0-2)	Salata (1)	ESPN+		4-13	
Mar. 27	at Illinois State		Duffy Bass Field • Normal, IL	**L** 9-10	Burns (1-0)	**Anderson** (0-4)	Salata (2)	ESPN+		4-14	
Mar. 28	at Illinois State		Duffy Bass Field • Normal, IL	**W** 13-6	**Williams** (2-0)	Gilmore (0-1)	None	ESPN+		5-14	

April (7-8)
Date	Opponent	Rank	Site/stadium	Score	Win	Loss	Save	TV	Attendance	Overall record	SBC record
Apr. 1	Little Rock		Tomlinson Stadium–Kell Field • Jonesboro, AR	**W** 10-2	**Hudson** (2-0)	Funk (0-3)	**Jumper** (2)	ESPN+	405	6-14	1-3
Apr. 2	Little Rock		Tomlinson Stadium–Kell Field • Jonesboro, AR	**W** 4-0	**Jeans** (1-0)	Arnold (3-3)	None	ESPN+	422	7-14	2-3
Apr. 3	Little Rock		Tomlinson Stadium–Kell Field • Jonesboro, AR	**W** 10-6	**Holt** (1-2)	DeCooman (0-2)	None	ESPN+	510	8-14	3-3
Apr. 6	Central Arkansas		Tomlinson Stadium–Kell Field • Jonesboro, AR	Game Postponed due to COVID-19 protocol							
Apr. 9	at Louisiana		M. L. Tigue Moore Field at Russo Park • Lafayette, LA	**L** 3-10	Arrighetti (6-1)	**Jeans** (1-1)	Talley (5)	ESPN+	900	8-15	3-4
Apr. 10	at Louisiana		M. L. Tigue Moore Field at Russo Park • Lafayette, LA	**L** 0-9	Cooke (4-2)	**Nash** (1-3)	None	ESPN+	851	8-16	3-5
Apr. 11	at Louisiana		M. L. Tigue Moore Field at Russo Park • Lafayette, LA	**W** 16-11	**Jumper** (1-2)	Christie (1-1)	**Stone** (3)		782	9-16	4-5
Apr. 13	at No. 4 Mississippi State		Dudy Noble Field, Polk–DeMent Stadium • Mississippi State, MS	**L** 10-18	Smith (1-0)	**Algee** (0-1)	None	SECN+	2,447	9-17	
Apr. 16	UT Arlington		Tomlinson Stadium–Kell Field • Jonesboro, AR	**L** 5-7	King (2-0)	**Algee** (0-2)	Wong (5)	ESPN+	415	9-18	4-6
Apr. 17	UT Arlington		Tomlinson Stadium–Kell Field • Jonesboro, AR	**L** 2-9	Bullard (6-2)	**Nash** (1-4)	None	ESPN+	356	9-19	4-7
Apr. 18	UT Arlington		Tomlinson Stadium–Kell Field • Jonesboro, AR	**W** 5-3	**Holt** (2-2)	Moffat (3-2)	**Stone** (4)	ESPN+	307	10-19	5-7
Apr. 20	at Central Arkansas		Bear Stadium • Conway, AR	**L** 3-5	Shoultz (1-0)	**Albat** (0-1)	Cleveland (6)		245	10-20	
Apr. 23	at Texas State		Bobcat Ballpark • San Marcos, TX	**L** 4-11	Leigh (3-5)	**Hudson** (2-1)	None	ESPN+	700	10-21	5-8
Apr. 24	at Texas State		Bobcat Ballpark • San Marcos, TX	**L** 5-6	Stivors (2-2)	**Stone** (0-2)	None	ESPN+	700	10-22	5-9
Apr. 25	at Texas State		Bobcat Ballpark • San Marcos, TX	**W** 12-1	**Holt** (3-2)	Dixon (0-1)	**Jumper** (3)	ESPN+	700	11-22	6-9
Apr. 30	at Austin Peay		Raymond C. Hand Park • Clarksville, TN	**W** 12-7	**Hudson** (3-1)	Brown (3-1)	None		206	12-22	

May (6–7)
Date	Opponent	Rank	Site/stadium	Score	Win	Loss	Save	TV	Attendance	Overall record	SBC record
May 1	at Austin Peay		Raymond C. Hand Park • Clarksville, TN	**W** 11-5	**Nash** (2-4)	Martinez (2-5)	None		272	13-22	
May 2	at Austin Peay		Raymond C. Hand Park • Clarksville, TN	**W** 9-4	**Anderson** (1-4)	O'Shoney (0-5)	None		207	14-22	
May 4	at No. 12 Ole Miss		Swayze Field • Oxford, MS	**L** 12-15	Mallitz (4-1)	**Jeans** (1-2)	Diamond (1)	SECN	6,682	14-23	
May 7	Georgia Southern		Tomlinson Stadium–Kell Field • Jonesboro, AR	**W** 6-1	**Hudson** (4-1)	Owens (6-1)	None	ESPN+	346	15-23	7-9
May 8	Georgia Southern		Tomlinson Stadium–Kell Field • Jonesboro, AR	**W** 4-0	**Nash** (3-4)	Dollander (4-2)	**Jumper** (4)	ESPN+	457	16-23	8-9
May 8	Georgia Southern		Tomlinson Stadium–Kell Field • Jonesboro, AR	**L** 2-3	Jackson (3-6)	**Holt** (3-3)	Jones (14)	ESPN+	457	16-24	8-10
May 11	at No. 1 Arkansas		Baum–Walker Stadium • Fayetteville, AR	**L** 4-8	Lockhart (2-2)	**Jeans** (1-3)	None	SECN+	7,645	16-25	
May 14	at Troy		Riddle–Pace Field • Troy, AL	**L** 4-12	Gainous (8-4)	**Hudson** (4-2)	None	ESPN+	834	16-26	8-11
May 15	at Troy		Riddle–Pace Field • Troy, AL	**L** 1-3	Ortiz (6-4)	**Nash** (3-5)	Oates (5)	ESPN+	866	16-27	8-12
May 16	at Troy		Riddle–Pace Field • Troy, AL	**W** 9-5	**Holt** (4-3)	Witcher (6-3)	None	ESPN+	816	17-27	9-12
May 20	Louisiana–Monroe		Tomlinson Stadium–Kell Field • Jonesboro, AR	**W** 12-6	**Hudson** (5-2)	Barlow (7-5)	None	ESPN+	343	18-27	10-12
May 21	Louisiana–Monroe		Tomlinson Stadium–Kell Field • Jonesboro, AR	**L** 7-10	Wepf (2-0)	**Nash** (3-6)	Orton (8)	ESPN+	557	18-28	10-13
May 22	Louisiana–Monroe		Tomlinson Stadium–Kell Field • Jonesboro, AR	**L** 4-6	Lien (4-2)	**Jeans** (1-4)	Orton (9)	ESPN+	417	18-29	10-14

Postseason (1–1)

SBC Tournament (1–1)
Date	Opponent	Seed/Rank	Site/stadium	Score	Win	Loss	Save	TV	Attendance	Overall record	Tournament record
May 25	vs. (3E) Troy	(5W)	Montgomery Riverwalk Stadium • Montgomery, AL	**W** 9-6	**Stone** (1-2)	Oates (3-2)	None	ESPN+		19-29	1-0
May 27	vs. (2W) UT Arlington	(5W)	Montgomery Riverwalk Stadium • Montgomery, AL	**L** 3-8	Tavera (3-4)	**Hudson** (5-3)	None	ESPN+		19-30	1-1

Schedule source:

*Rankings are based on the team's current ranking in the D1Baseball poll.

== Postseason ==
=== Conference accolades ===
- Player of the Year: Mason McWhorter – GASO
- Pitcher of the Year: Hayden Arnold – LR
- Freshman of the Year: Garrett Gainous – TROY
- Newcomer of the Year: Drake Osborn – LA
- Coach of the Year: Mark Calvi – USA

All Conference First Team

- Connor Cooke (LA)
- Hayden Arnold (LR)
- Carlos Tavera (UTA)
- Nick Jones (GASO)
- Drake Osborn (LA)
- Robbie Young (APP)
- Luke Drumheller (APP)
- Drew Frederic (TROY)
- Ben Klutts (ARST)
- Mason McWhorter (GASO)
- Logan Cerny (TROY)
- Ethan Wilson (USA)
- Cameron Jones (GSU)
- Ben Fitzgerald (LA)

All Conference Second Team

- JoJo Booker (USA)
- Tyler Tuthill (APP)
- Jeremy Lee (USA)
- Aaron Barkley (LR)
- BT Riopelle (CCU)
- Dylan Paul (UTA)
- Travis Washburn (ULM)
- Eric Brown (CCU)
- Grant Schulz (ULM)
- Tyler Duncan (ARST)
- Parker Chavers (CCU)
- Josh Smith (GSU)
- Andrew Miller (UTA)
- Noah Ledford (GASO)
