= 2021 Coastal Carolina Chanticleers baseball team =

American college baseball season

2021 Coastal Carolina Chanticleers baseball
- Conference: Sun Belt Conference
- East Division
- Record: 27–24 (9–12 SBC)
- Head coach: Gary Gilmore (26th season)
- Assistant coaches: Kevin Schnall (18th season); Drew Thomas (15th season); Matt Schilling (14th season)
- Home stadium: Springs Brooks Stadium

2021 Sun Belt Conference baseball standings
	Conf.				Overall
Team	W		L	PCT	W		L	PCT
East Division
South Alabama ^{x}‍‍‡‍^{y}	15	–	9	.625	36	–	22	.621
Georgia Southern ‍‍‍	14	–	10	.583	34	–	23	.596
Troy ‍‍‍	13	–	11	.542	27	–	26	.509
Appalachian State ‍‍‍	11	–	10	.524	21	–	31	.404
Georgia State ‍‍‍	12	–	12	.500	18	–	37	.327
Coastal Carolina ‍‍‍	9	–	12	.429	27	–	24	.529
West Division
Louisiana ^{x}‍‍‍	13	–	11	.542	32	–	23	.582
UT Arlington ‍‍‍	13	–	11	.542	27	–	30	.474
Louisiana–Monroe ‍‍‍	11	–	13	.458	26	–	26	.500
Little Rock ‍‍‍	11	–	13	.458	21	–	30	.412
Arkansas State ‍‍‍	10	–	14	.417	19	–	30	.388
Texas State ‍‍‍	9	–	15	.375	21	–	36	.368
x – Division champion ‡ – Tournament champion y – Invited to the NCAA tournament As of June 7, 2021; Rankings from D1Baseball

The 2021 Coastal Carolina Chanticleers baseball team represented Coastal Carolina University during the 2021 NCAA Division I baseball season. The Chanticleers played their home games at Springs Brooks Stadium and were led by twenty-sixth year head coach Gary Gilmore. They were members of the Sun Belt Conference.

== Preseason ==
=== Signing-day recruits ===
Player	Hometown	Previous Team
Pitchers
Darin Horn	Bluffton, South Carolina	May River HS
Braedon Karpathios	Willow Street, Pennsylvania	Lampeter-Strasburg HS
Jacob Lauderdale	Thomasville, Georgia	Brookwood HS
Matt Potok	Jackson, New Jersey	Jackson Memorial HS
Ethan Salak	Myrtle Beach, South Carolina	St. James HS
Hitters
Derek Bender	Murrells Inlet, South Carolina	St. James HS
Kobe Benson	Boca Raton, Florida	North Broward Prep
Andrew Muraco	Murrysville, Pennsylvania	Franklin Regional HS
Orlando Pena	Jersey City, New Jersey	Bergen Catholic HS
Ernesto Polanco	West New York, New Jersey	Memorial HS

=== Sun Belt Conference Coaches Poll ===
The Sun Belt Conference Coaches Poll was released on February 15, 2021 and the Chanticleers were picked to finish first in the East Division with 69 votes and first overall in the conference with 10 votes.

Coaches poll (East)
Predicted finish	Team	Votes (1st place)
1	Coastal Carolina	69 (10)
2	South Alabama	51 (1)
3	Georgia Southern	51 (1)
4	Troy	44
5	Appalachian State	21
6	Georgia State	16

=== Preseason All-Sun Belt Team & Honors ===
- Aaron Funk (LR, Pitcher)
- Jordan Jackson (GASO, Pitcher)
- Conor Angel (LA, Pitcher)
- Wyatt Divis (UTA, Pitcher)
- Lance Johnson (TROY, Pitcher)
- Caleb Bartolero (TROY, Catcher)
- William Sullivan (TROY, 1st Base)
- Luke Drumheller (APP, 2nd Base)
- Drew Frederic (TROY, Shortstop)
- Cooper Weiss (CCU, 3rd Base)
- Ethan Wilson (USA, Outfielder)
- Parker Chavers (CCU, Outfielder)
- Rigsby Mosley (TROY, Outfielder)
- Eilan Merejo (GSU, Designated Hitter)
- Andrew Beesly (ULM, Utility)

== Roster ==
2021 Coastal Carolina Chanticleers roster
Pitchers: 2 Erik Johnson - Junior; 8 Alaska Abney - Junior; 12 Jonathan Blackwell - Sophomore; 13 Shaddon Peavyhouse - Redshirt Junior; 17 Daniel Kreuzer - Senior; 18 Keaton Hopwood - Freshman; 26 Riley Eikhoff - Freshman; 29 Noah Eaker - Redshirt Junior; 31 Will Smith - Redshirt Freshman; 32 Josh Jarman - Senior; 34 Reece Maniscalco - Senior; 35 Jacob Maton - Redshirt Sophomore; 37 Nick Parker - Junior; 38 Reid Vanscoter - Redshirt Junior; 39 Hunter Sibley - Junior; 40 Casey Green - Sophomore; 41 Trevor Damron - Senior; 43 Matt Joyce - Freshman; 44 Luke Barrow - Freshman; 49 Connor Kurki - Freshman; 51 Aaron Combs - Freshman; 53 Teddy Sharkey - Freshman	Catchers: 24 Clay Wargo - Freshman; 25 BT Riopelle - Junior; 27 Tanner Garrison - Sophomore; 33 Alex Gattinelli - Senior; 47 Hunter Ashburn - Redshirt Senior; Infielders: 1 Dale Thomas - Sophomore; 5 Brian Port - Sophomore; 6 Nick Lucky - Junior; 7 Cooper Weiss - Sophomore; 11 Brady Moore - Freshman; 16 Zach Beach - Sophomore; 19 Fox Leum - Redshirt Senior; 20 Eric Brown - Sophomore; 36 Walt Richardson - Redshirt Sophomore; Outfielders: 3 Parker Chavers - Redshirt Junior; 10 Billy Underwood - Freshman; 21 Lorenzo Morello - Junior; 23 Makenzie Pate - Sophomore; 30 Tyler Johnson - Junior; 45 Wade Kelly - Freshman

=== Coaching staff ===
2021 Coastal Carolina Chanticleers coaching staff
- Gary Gilmore – Head coach – 26th year
- Kevin Schnall – Associate head coach/recruiting coordinator/catchers coach – 18th year
- Drew Thomas – Assistant head coach/pitching coach – 15th year
- Matt Schilling – Volunteer assistant coach – 15th year

== Schedule and results ==
Legend
	Coastal Carolina win
	Coastal Carolina loss
	Postponement/Cancelation/Suspensions
**Bold**	Coastal Carolina team member

2021 Coastal Carolina Chanticleers baseball game log
Regular season (26–23)

February (5–2)
Date	Opponent	Rank	Site/stadium	Score	Win	Loss	Save	TV	Attendance	Overall record	SBC record
Feb. 19	Duke		Springs Brooks Stadium • Conway, SC	Postponed due to threat of freezing rain/snow/sleet in Conway							
Feb. 20	Duke		Springs Brooks Stadium • Conway, SC	**L** 4–12	Stinson (1–0)	**Maton** (0–1)	None	ESPN+	658	0–1	
Feb. 21	Duke		Springs Brooks Stadium • Conway, SC	**W** 8–7	**Abney** (1–0)	Johnson (0–1)	None	ESPN+	1,000	1–1	
Feb. 21	Duke		Springs Brooks Stadium • Conway, SC	**L** 9–10	Conte (1–0)	**Peavyhouse** (0–1)	Allen (1)	ESPN+	1,000	1–2	
Feb. 23	at No. 16 Wake Forest		David F. Couch Ballpark • Winston-Salem, NC	**W** 4–1 ^{(12)}	**Hopwood** (1–0)	Mascolo (0–1)	None	ACCNX	50	2–2	
CCU Baseball Tournament
Feb. 26	Bryant		Springs Brooks Stadium • Conway, SC	**W** 8–1	**Maton** (1–1)	Mattison (1–1)	None	ESPN+	1,000	3–2	
Feb. 27	No. 23 West Virginia		Springs Brooks Stadium • Conway, SC	**W** 10–5	**Peavyhouse** (1–1)	Ottinger (0–1)	None	ESPN+	1,000	4–2	
Feb. 28	Kennesaw State		Springs Brooks Stadium • Conway, SC	**W** 13–11				ESPN+		5–2	

March (9–7)
Date	Opponent	Rank	Site/stadium	Score	Win	Loss	Save	TV	Attendance	Overall record	SBC record
Baseball at the Beach
Mar. 5	Davidson		Springs Brooks Stadium • Conway, SC	**W** 15–5	**Maton (2–1)**	Levy (1–1)	None	ESPN+	1,000	6–2	
Mar. 6	Miami (OH)		Springs Brooks Stadium • Conway, SC	**W** 5-3	**Parker** (1-0)	Brand (0-1)	**Abney** (2)	ESPN+	1,000	7-2	
Mar. 7	UConn		Springs Brooks Stadium • Conway, SC	**L** 4-5 (12 inns)	Wurster (2-0)	**Barrow** (0-1)	None	ESPN+	1,000	7-3	
Mar. 8	UConn		Springs Brooks Stadium • Conway, SC	**W** 12-10	**Maniscalco** (1-0)	Gallagher (0-1)	**Abney** (3)	ESPN+	1,000	8-3	
Mar. 12	FIU		Springs Brooks Stadium • Conway, SC	**L** 6-8	Myrick (2-1)	**Maton** (2-2)	Tiburcio (1)	ESPN+	1,000	8-4	
Mar. 13	FIU		Springs Brooks Stadium • Conway, SC	**L** 4-7	Casey (1-0)	**Parker** (1-1)	Fletcher (1)	ESPN+	1,000	8-5	
Mar. 13	FIU		Springs Brooks Stadium • Conway, SC	**W** 7-0	**VanScoter** (1-0)	Rukes (1-1)	None	ESPN+	1,000	9-5	
Mar. 14	FIU		Springs Brooks Stadium • Conway, SC	**W** 6-1	**Hopwood** (3-0)	Hernandez (0-2)	None	ESPN+	1,000	10-5	
Mar. 16	NC State		Springs Brooks Stadium • Conway, SC	Game Cancelled							
Mar. 19	at West Virginia		Monongalia County Ballpark • Morgantown, WV	**W** 5-2	**VanScoter** (2-0)	Wolf (1-2)	**Abney** (4)		600	11-5	
Mar. 20	at West Virginia		Monongalia County Ballpark • Morgantown, WV	**L** 4-5	Abernathy (1-0)	**Sharkey** (0-1)	Jeffrey (2)		600	11-6	
Mar. 21	at West Virginia		Monongalia County Ballpark • Morgantown, WV	**W** 9-6	**Hopwood** (4-0)	Reed (0-1)	None		600	12-6	
Mar. 23	College of Charleston		Springs Brooks Stadium • Conway, SC	**W** 8-7	**Peaveyhouse** (2-1)	Campbell (2-1)	**Abney** (2)	ESPN+	1,000	13-6	
Mar. 26	at Louisiana		M. L. Tigue Moore Field at Russo Park • Lafayette, LA	**L** 2-9	Arrighetti (4-1)	**VanScoter** (2-1)	None	ESPN+	1,004	13-7	0-1
Mar. 27	at Louisiana		M. L. Tigue Moore Field at Russo Park • Lafayette, LA	**W** 5-3	**Parker** (2-1)	Menard (0-1)	**Barrow** (1)	ESPN+	828	14-7	1-1
Mar. 28	at Louisiana		M. L. Tigue Moore Field at Russo Park • Lafayette, LA	**L** 3-5	Perrin (1-1)	**Hopwood** (4-1)	Cooke (1)	ESPN+	730	14-8	1-2
Mar. 29	at Louisiana		M. L. Tigue Moore Field at Russo Park • Lafayette, LA	**W** 0-7	Burk (2-0)	**Green** (0-1)	None		418	14-9	

April (5-9)
Date	Opponent	Rank	Site/stadium	Score	Win	Loss	Save	TV	Attendance	Overall record	SBC record
Apr. 1	Appalachian State		Springs Brooks Stadium • Conway, SC	Game postponed due to COVID-19 protocol							
Apr. 2	Appalachian State		Springs Brooks Stadium • Conway, SC	Game postponed due to COVID-19 protocol							
Apr. 3	Appalachian State		Springs Brooks Stadium • Conway, SC	Game postponed due to COVID-19 protocol							
Apr. 6	UNC Wilmington		Springs Brooks Stadium • Conway, SC	Game postponed due to COVID-19 protocol							
Apr. 7	College of Charleston		Springs Brooks Stadium • Conway, SC	Game postponed due to COVID-19 protocol							
Apr. 9	at UT Arlington		Clay Gould Ballpark • Arlington, TX	**W** 8-7	**Sharkey** (1-1)	Wong (1-1)	None	ESPN+	314	15-9	2-2
Apr. 10	at UT Arlington		Clay Gould Ballpark • Arlington, TX	**L** 3-7	Bullard (5-2)	**Parker** (2-2)	None	ESPN+	314	15-10	2-3
Apr. 11	at UT Arlington		Clay Gould Ballpark • Arlington, TX	**L** 1-5	Moffat (3-1)	**Maton** (2-3)	Wong (4)	ESPN+	314	15-11	2-4
Apr. 13	at UNC Wilmington		Brooks Field • Wilmington, NC	**W** 8-2	**Jarman** (1-0)	Holjes (0-1)	None	FloBaseball	492	16-11	
Apr. 16	Georgia Southern		Springs Brooks Stadium • Conway, SC	**L** 2-8	Owens (5-0)	**Hopwood** (4-2)	None	ESPN+	1,000	16-12	2-5
Apr. 17	Georgia Southern		Springs Brooks Stadium • Conway, SC	**L** 3-8	Hays (2-1)	**Parker** (2-3)	Jones (10)	ESPN+	1,000	16-13	2-6
Apr. 18	Georgia Southern		Springs Brooks Stadium • Conway, SC	**W** 8-6	**Sharkey** (2-1)	Jackson (2-5)	**Kreuzer** (1)	ESPN+	1,000	17-13	3-6
Apr. 20	at North Carolina		Boshamer Stadium • Chapel Hill, NC	**W** 6-3	**Sharkey** (3-1)	Alba (2-3)	None	ACCN	850	18-13	
Apr. 23	at Liberty		Liberty Baseball Stadium • Lynchburg, VA	**L** 2-7	Delaite (6-1)	**Abney** (1-1)	None		619	18-14	
Apr. 24	at Liberty		Liberty Baseball Stadium • Lynchburg, VA	**W** 2-0	**Parker** (3-3)	Willard (2-1)	**Kruezer** (2)		475	19-14	
Apr. 25	at Liberty		Liberty Baseball Stadium • Lynchburg, VA	**L** 4-6	Erickson (7-1)	**Barrow** (0-2)	Riley (5)		562	19-15	
Apr. 27	UNC Wilmington		Springs Brooks Stadium • Conway, SC	**L** 1-11	Hudak (2-0)	**Barrow** (0-3)	None	ESPN+	1,000	19-16	
Apr. 28	at UNC Wilmington		Brooks Field • Wilmington, NC	**L** 6-7	Chenault (2-1)	**Hopwood** (4-3)	None		492	19-17	
Apr. 30	at Georgia State		Georgia State Baseball Complex • Decatur, GA	**L** 1-2	Dawson (2-2)	**Peavyhouse** (2-2)	None	ESPN+	382	19-18	3-7

May (7–5)
Date	Opponent	Rank	Site/stadium	Score	Win	Loss	Save	TV	Attendance	Overall record	SBC record
May 1	at Georgia State		Georgia State Baseball Complex • Decatur, GA	**W** 8-4	**Kreuzer** (1-0)	Lutz (0-1)	None	ESPN+	425	20-18	4-7
May 2	at Georgia State		Georgia State Baseball Complex • Decatur, GA	**W** 12-10	**Joyce** (1-0)	Sweatt (2-2)	**Peavyhouse** (1)	ESPN+	392	21-18	5-7
May 7	Troy		Springs Brooks Stadium • Conway, SC	**L** 7-9	Gainous (7-4)	**Abney** (1-2)	Oates (5)	ESPN+	1,000	21-19	5-8
May 8	Troy		Springs Brooks Stadium • Conway, SC	**L** 7-9	Ortiz (5-4)	**Parker** (3-4)	Oates (6)	ESPN+	1,000	21-20	5-9
May 9	Troy		Springs Brooks Stadium • Conway, SC	**L** 6-10	Witcher (5-2)	**Kurki** (0-1)	None	ESPN+	1,000	21-21	5-10
May 12	at College of Charleston		CofC Baseball Stadium at Patriots Point • Mount Pleasant, SC	Game cancelled							
May 14	at South Alabama		Eddie Stanky Field • Mobile, AL	**W** 4-2	**Abney** (2-2)	Perez (0-1)	None		829	22-21	6-10
May 15	at South Alabama		Eddie Stanky Field • Mobile, AL	**L** 1-3	Boswell (3-3)	**Kreuzer** (1-1)	Lehrmann (1)		850	22-22	6-11
May 16	at South Alabama		Eddie Stanky Field • Mobile, AL	**L** 1-4	Booker (6-0)	**Parker** (3-5)	Dalton (3)		841	22-23	6-12
May 18	Wake Forest		Springs Brooks Stadium • Conway, SC	**W** 14-9	**Barrow** (1-1)	Mascolo (3-2)	None	ESPN+	1,000	23-23	
May 20	Texas State		Springs Brooks Stadium • Conway, SC	**W** 10-5	**Sharkey** (4-1)	Leigh (4-7)	None	ESPN+	1,000	24-23	7-12
May 21	Texas State		Springs Brooks Stadium • Conway, SC	**W** 8-7 (10 inns)	**Abney** (3-2)	Stivors (2-3)	None	ESPN+	1,000	25-23	8-12
May 22	Texas State		Springs Brooks Stadium • Conway, SC	**W** 12-2 (7 inns)	**Sibley** (1-0)	Robie (0-2)	None	ESPN+	1,000	26-23	9-12

Postseason (1–1)

SBC Tournament (1–1)
Date	Opponent	Seed/Rank	Site/stadium	Score	Win	Loss	Save	TV	Attendance	Overall record	Tournament record
May 25	vs. (4W) Little Rock		Montgomery Riverwalk Stadium • Montgomery, AL	**W** 15-1 (7 inns)	**Peavyhouse** (3-2)	Arnold (7-4)	**Joyce** (1)	ESPN+		27-23	1-0
May 26	vs. (1E) South Alabama		Montgomery Riverwalk Stadium • Montgomery, AL	**L** 7-14	Smith (5-1)	**Kreuzer** (1-2)	Boyd (1)	ESPN+		27-24	1-1

Schedule source:

*Rankings are based on the team's current ranking in the D1Baseball poll.

== Postseason ==
=== Conference accolades ===
- Player of the Year: Mason McWhorter – GASO
- Pitcher of the Year: Hayden Arnold – LR
- Freshman of the Year: Garrett Gainous – TROY
- Newcomer of the Year: Drake Osborn – LA
- Coach of the Year: Mark Calvi – USA

All Conference First Team

- Connor Cooke (LA)
- Hayden Arnold (LR)
- Carlos Tavera (UTA)
- Nick Jones (GASO)
- Drake Osborn (LA)
- Robbie Young (APP)
- Luke Drumheller (APP)
- Drew Frederic (TROY)
- Ben Klutts (ARST)
- Mason McWhorter (GASO)
- Logan Cerny (TROY)
- Ethan Wilson (USA)
- Cameron Jones (GSU)
- Ben Fitzgerald (LA)

All Conference Second Team

- JoJo Booker (USA)
- Tyler Tuthill (APP)
- Jeremy Lee (USA)
- Aaron Barkley (LR)
- BT Riopelle (CCU)
- Dylan Paul (UTA)
- Travis Washburn (ULM)
- Eric Brown (CCU)
- Grant Schulz (ULM)
- Tyler Duncan (ARST)
- Parker Chavers (CCU)
- Josh Smith (GSU)
- Andrew Miller (UTA)
- Noah Ledford (GASO)

== Rankings ==
Ranking movements Legend: ██ Increase in ranking ██ Decrease in ranking — = Not ranked RV = Received votes
	Week																
Poll	Pre	1	2	3	4	5	6	7	8	9	10	11	12	13	14	15	Final
Coaches'	RV	RV*	RV	RV	RV	RV	—	—	—	—	—	—	—	—	—	—	—
Baseball America	—	—	—	—	—	—	—	—	—	—	—	—	—	—	—	—	—
Collegiate Baseball^	23	—	—	—	—	—	—	—	—	—	—	—	—	—	—	—	—
NCBWA†	RV	RV	RV	RV	RV	RV	RV	—	—	—	—	—	—	—	—	—	—
D1Baseball	—	—	—	—	—	—	—	—	—	—	—	—	—	—	—	—	—

^ Collegiate Baseball ranked 40 teams in their preseason poll, but only ranked 30 teams weekly during the season.
† NCBWA ranks 30 teams in their preseason poll, but only ranks 25 teams weekly during the season.
* A new poll was not released for this week, so for comparison purposes, the previous week's ranking is inserted in this week's slot.
