= Harlem High School (Georgia) =

Public high school in Harlem, Georgia, United States

Location
- 1070 Appling-Harlem Road; Harlem, Columbia, Georgia 30814; United States; 33.45675°N 82.3128°W

Information
- Type: Public secondary
- Motto: "We Are Harlem!"
- Opened: 1871
- School district: Columbia County School System
- Superintendent: Sandra Carraway
- Principal: Casey Dees
- Faculty: 64
- Teaching staff: 71.70 (FTE)
- Grades: 9-12
- Gender: Coed
- Enrollment: 1,251 (2023-2024)
- Student to teacher ratio: 17.45
- Classrooms: 51
- Campus type: Rural
- Colors: Red and black
- Fight song: "Bulldogs Lead The Way"
- Athletics conference: GHSA 4-AAA
- Nickname: Dogs
- Team name: Bulldogs
- Rival: Grovetown High School, Thomson High School, Lincoln County High School
- Accreditation: Southern Association of Colleges and Schools, Georgia Accrediting Commission
- Website: https://harlemhs.ccboe.net/#

Harlem High School is a public high school in Harlem, Georgia, United States, in Columbia County.

The school had a shooting incident in 1993, in which one student was killed and another was injured.

The school's teams compete as the Bulldogs.

Aviator Joseph C. Miles graduated from Harlem High School in 1943, as did former Georgia State Representative Robin L. Williams

The school features a diversity of clubs, including Beta Club, National Honors Society, Science Club, and Health Occupation Students of America (HOSA).

== Sports ==
- Baseball
- Basketball
- Cheer (football, basketball, competition)
- Cross country
- Football
- Golf
- Raider color guard, drill team (Army JROTC)
- Soccer
- Softball
- Tennis
- Track and field
- Volleyball
- Wrestling
