= Evans High School (Georgia) =

Public high school in Evans, Georgia, United States

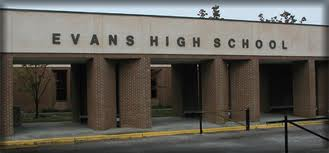
- Evans High School facade

Location
- 4550 Cox Road; Evans, Columbia County, Georgia 30809; United States; 33°31′28″N 82°08′50″W

Information
- Type: Public secondary
- Established: 1926
- School district: Columbia County School System
- Principal: Wade White
- Teaching staff: 100.10 (FTE)
- Grades: 9–12
- Gender: Coed
- Enrollment: 1,800 (2024–2025)
- Student to teacher ratio: 17.98
- Colors: Black and gold
- Nickname: Knights
- Rival: Grovetown High School; Lakeside High School; Greenbrier High School
- Website: https://evanshs.ccboe.net

Evans Comprehensive High School is a public high school located in Evans, north of Augusta, Georgia, United States. It serves students in grades 9–12 in the Columbia County School System.

== Notable alumni ==
- Rick Allen, U.S. Representative for Georgia's 12th congressional district
- Hunter Foster, musical theater actor
- Ben Hayslip, country music songwriter
- Todd Greene, MLB catcher
- Forrest Griffin, UFC Hall of Fame fighter
- Kathryn McCormick, dancer and actress
- Sean Rossini, professional wrestler
- CJ Pearson, political commentator
