= 2021 Appalachian State Mountaineers baseball team =

American college baseball season

2021 Appalachian State Mountaineers baseball
- Conference: Sun Belt Conference
- East Division
- Record: 21–31 (11–10 SBC)
- Head coach: Kermit Smith (5th season)
- Assistant coaches: Justin Aspergren; Britt Johnson
- Home stadium: Beaver Field at Jim and Bettie Smith Stadium

2021 Sun Belt Conference baseball standings
	Conf.				Overall
Team	W		L	PCT	W		L	PCT
East Division
South Alabama ^{x}‍‍‡‍^{y}	15	–	9	.625	36	–	22	.621
Georgia Southern ‍‍‍	14	–	10	.583	34	–	23	.596
Troy ‍‍‍	13	–	11	.542	27	–	26	.509
Appalachian State ‍‍‍	11	–	10	.524	21	–	31	.404
Georgia State ‍‍‍	12	–	12	.500	18	–	37	.327
Coastal Carolina ‍‍‍	9	–	12	.429	27	–	24	.529
West Division
Louisiana ^{x}‍‍‍	13	–	11	.542	32	–	23	.582
UT Arlington ‍‍‍	13	–	11	.542	27	–	30	.474
Louisiana–Monroe ‍‍‍	11	–	13	.458	26	–	26	.500
Little Rock ‍‍‍	11	–	13	.458	21	–	30	.412
Arkansas State ‍‍‍	10	–	14	.417	19	–	30	.388
Texas State ‍‍‍	9	–	15	.375	21	–	36	.368
x – Division champion ‡ – Tournament champion y – Invited to the NCAA tournament As of June 7, 2021; Rankings from D1Baseball

The 2021 Appalachian State Mountaineers baseball team represented Appalachian State University during the 2021 NCAA Division I baseball season. The Mountaineers played their home games at Beaver Field at Jim and Bettie Smith Stadium and were led by fifth-year head coach Kermit Smith. They were members of the Sun Belt Conference.

== Preseason ==
=== Signing Day Recruits ===
Player	Hometown	Previous Team
Pitchers
Eli Ellington	Charlotte, North Carolina	Gulf Coast CC
Jeriah Henry	Lake Wales, Florida	Lawson State CC
Owen Kincaid	Jamestown, North Carolina	Southwest Guilford HS
Ben Peterson	Cary, North Carolina	Apex HS
AJ Stinson	Hattiesburg, Mississippi	Lawson State CC
Trey Tujetsch	Fort Mill, South Carolina	South Carolina
Hitters
Carson Arnold	Mooresville, North Carolina	Lake Norman HS
Hunter Bryson	Charlotte, North Carolina	Providence HS
Trent Lewis	Sebring, Florida	Avon Park HS
Austin Raynor	Granite Falls, North Carolina	South Caldwell HS

=== Sun Belt Conference Coaches Poll ===
The Sun Belt Conference Coaches Poll was released on February 15, 2021 and the Mountaineers were picked to finish fifth in the East Division with 21 votes.

Coaches poll (East)
Predicted finish	Team	Votes (1st place)
1	Coastal Carolina	69 (10)
2	South Alabama	51 (1)
3	Georgia Southern	51 (1)
4	Troy	44
5	Appalachian State	21
6	Georgia State	16

=== Preseason All-Sun Belt Team and Honors ===
- Aaron Funk (LR, Pitcher)
- Jordan Jackson (GASO, Pitcher)
- Conor Angel (LA, Pitcher)
- Wyatt Divis (UTA, Pitcher)
- Lance Johnson (TROY, Pitcher)
- Caleb Bartolero (TROY, Catcher)
- William Sullivan (TROY, 1st Base)
- Luke Drumheller (APP, 2nd Base)
- Drew Frederic (TROY, Shortstop)
- Cooper Weiss (CCU, 3rd Base)
- Ethan Wilson (USA, Outfielder)
- Parker Chavers (CCU, Outfielder)
- Rigsby Mosley (TROY, Outfielder)
- Eilan Merejo (GSU, Designated Hitter)
- Andrew Beesly (ULM, Utility)

== Personnel ==
=== Roster ===
2021 Appalachian State Mountaineers roster
Pitchers: 10 Cameron Kepley - Redshirt Junior; 11 Evan Mauldin - Redshirt Sophomore; 13 Cole Hooper - Redshirt Junior; 14 Cy Smith - Sophomore; 16 Noah Hall - Sophomore; 18 Quinton Martinez - Senior; 20 Andrew Papp - Super Senior; 21 Tyler Tuthill - Junior; 26 Jason Cornatzer - Redshirt Junior; 29 Eli Ellington - Redshirt Junior; 30 Shane Roberts - Redshirt Junior; 33 Austin Primm - Junior; 36 Owen Kincaid - Freshman; 37 Cam Roberts - Redshirt Junior; 38 Trey Tujetsch - Sophomore; 39 Joseph Lowder - Redshirt Senior; 42 Jeriah Henry - Junior; 44 Luke Davis - Redshirt Junior; 45 AJ Stinson - Junior; 46 Ben Peterson - Freshman	Catchers: 6 Carson Arnold - Freshman; 8 JD Yakubinis - Sophomore; 25 Jack Lipson - Senior; 35 Hayden Cross - Junior; Infielders: 3 Bailey Welch - Senior; 4 Luke Drumheller - Junior; 7 Peyton Idol - Sophomore; 9 Hunter Bryson - Freshman; 24 Trent Lewis - Freshman; 28 Robbie Young - Super Senior; 40 Vasili Kaloudis - Redshirt Freshman	Outfielders: 2 Austin Raynor - Freshman; 5 Kendall McGowan - Senior; 19 Dalton Williams - Redshirt Sophomore; 22 Alex Leshock - Senior; 27 Tyler Leek - Redshirt Senior; 34 Phillip Cole - Junior; Utility: 17 Andrew Greckel - Senior; 32 Andrew Terrell - Junior

=== Coaching staff ===
2021 Appalachian State Mountaineers coaching staff
- Kermit Smith – Head Coach – 5th year
- Justin Aspergren – Assistant Head Coach – 6th year
- Britt Johnson – Assistant Head Coach – 5th year
- Ryan Smoot – Volunteer Assistant – 1st year
- Chandler Seagle – Student Assistant – 1st year

== Schedule and results ==
Legend
	Appalachian State win
	Appalachian State loss
	Postponement/Cancelation/Suspensions
**Bold**	Appalachian State team member

2021 Appalachian State Mountaineers baseball game log
Regular season (20-30)

February (5-2)
Date	Opponent	Rank	Site/stadium	Score	Win	Loss	Save	TV	Attendance	Overall record	SBC record
Feb. 20	at Winthrop		Winthrop Ballpark • Rock Hill, SC	**W** 4-1	**Hall** (1-0)	Crumley (0-1)	None		180	1-0	
Feb. 20	at Winthrop		Winthrop Ballpark • Rock Hill, SC	**W** 4-0	**Martinez** (1-0)	Jones (0-1)	None		175	2-0	
Feb. 21	at Winthrop		Winthrop Ballpark • Rock Hill, SC	**L** 9-10	Skinner (1-0)	**Smith** (0-1)	None		120	2-1	
Feb. 23	at East Tennessee State		Thomas Stadium • Johnson City, TN	**W** 5-4	**Hall** (2-0)	Mercer (0-1)	None		308	3-1	
Feb. 27	North Carolina A&T		Beaver Field at Jim and Bettie Smith Stadium • Boone, NC	**W** 6-2	**Tuthill** (1-0)	Johnson (0-2)	**Hall** (1)		120	4-1	
Feb. 27	North Carolina A&T		Beaver Field at Jim and Bettie Smith Stadium • Boone, NC	**W** 7-6	**Martinez** (2-0)	Meachem (0-1)	**Ellington** (1)		120	5-1	
Feb. 28	at North Carolina A&T		World War Memorial Stadium • Greensboro, NC	**L** 3-11	Parks (1-0)	**Hooper** (0-1)	None			5-2	

March (6-10)
Date	Opponent	Rank	Site/stadium	Score	Win	Loss	Save	TV	Attendance	Overall record	SBC record
Mar. 2	North Carolina A&T		Beaver Field at Jim and Bettie Smith Stadium • Boone, NC	**W** 14-7	**Terrell** (1-0)	Meachem (0-2)	None		120	6-2	
Mar. 5	at No. 12 East Carolina		Clark–LeClair Stadium • Greenville, NC	**L** 2-13	Spivey (1-0)	**Tuthill** (1-1)	None		1,135	6-3	
Mar. 6	at No. 12 East Carolina		Clark–LeClair Stadium • Greenville, NC	**L** 2-5	Williams (1-0)	**Martinez** (2-1)	Mayhue (2)		1,184	6-4	
Mar. 7	at No. 12 East Carolina		Clark–LeClair Stadium • Greenville, NC	**L** 2-10	Whisenhunt (2-0)	**Tujetsch** (0-1)	None		1,194	6-5	
Mar. 12	at UNC Wilmington		Brooks Field • Wilmington, NC	**L** 1-6	Roupp (1-2)	**Tuthill** (1-2)	None	FloBaseball	492	6-6	
Mar. 13	at UNC Wilmington		Brooks Field • Wilmington, NC	**L** 1-4	Gesell (2-0)	**Martinez** (2-2)	Cota (1)	FloBaseball	500	6-7	
Mar. 14	at UNC Wilmington		Brooks Field • Wilmington, NC	**L** 1-7	Chenault (1-0)	**Terrell** (1-1)	None	FloBaseball	492	6-8	
Mar. 16	North Carolina A&T		Beaver Field at Jim and Bettie Smith Stadium • Boone, NC	**W** 14-5	**Peterson** (1-0)	O'Neal (0-1)	None	ESPN+	210	7-8	
Mar. 19	Arkansas State		Beaver Field at Jim and Bettie Smith Stadium • Boone, NC	**W** 5-4	**Tuthill** (2-2)	Nash (1-2)	**Hall** (2)	ESPN+	220	8-8	1-0
Mar. 20	Arkansas State		Beaver Field at Jim and Bettie Smith Stadium • Boone, NC	**W** 8-3	**Martinez** (3-2)	Holt (0-2)	None	ESPN+	220	9-8	2-0
Mar. 21	Arkansas State		Beaver Field at Jim and Bettie Smith Stadium • Boone, NC	**W** 12-2 (7 inns)	**Hall** (3-0)	Anderson (0-3)	None	ESPN+	215	10-8	3-0
Mar. 23	vs. Charlotte		Atrium Health Ballpark • Kannapolis, NC	**L** 5-15	Sims (1-0)	**Peterson** (1-1)	None	CUSA.TV	1,648	10-9	
Mar. 26	at Georgia Southern		J. I. Clements Stadium • Statesboro, GA	**L** 1-3	Owens (2-0)	**Tuthill** (2-3)	Jones (6)	ESPN+	779	10-10	3-1
Mar. 27	at Georgia Southern		J. I. Clements Stadium • Statesboro, GA	**L** 2-10	Dollander (3-1)	**Martinez** (3-3)	None	ESPN+	735	10-11	3-2
Mar. 28	at Georgia Southern		J. I. Clements Stadium • Statesboro, GA	**W** 3-1	**Hall** (4-0)	Johnson (1-2)	**Ellington** (2)		607	11-11	4-2
Mar. 30	at Wake Forest		David F. Couch Ballpark • Winston-Salem, NC	**L** 7-15	McNamee (3-0)	**Peterson** (1-2)	None	ACCN+	526	11-12	

April (5-9)
Date	Opponent	Rank	Site/stadium	Score	Win	Loss	Save	TV	Attendance	Overall record	SBC record
Apr. 1	at Coastal Carolina		Springs Brooks Stadium • Conway, SC	Game postponed due to COVID-19 protocol							
Apr. 2	at Coastal Carolina		Springs Brooks Stadium • Conway, SC	Game postponed due to COVID-19 protocol							
Apr. 3	at Coastal Carolina		Springs Brooks Stadium • Conway, SC	Game postponed due to COVID-19 protocol							
Apr. 6	at NC State		Doak Field • Raleigh, NC	**L** 2-13	Villaman (2-2)	**Martinez** (3-4)	None	ACCN+	365	11-13	
Apr. 9	Georgia State		Beaver Field at Jim and Bettie Smith Stadium • Boone, NC	**W** 4-2	**Cornatzer** (1-0)	Jones (0-4)	**Ellington** (3)		220	12-13	5-2
Apr. 10	Georgia State		Beaver Field at Jim and Bettie Smith Stadium • Boone, NC	**W** 9-7	**Ellington** (1-0)	Treadway (0-4)	**Terrell** (1)		220	13-13	6-2
Apr. 11	Georgia State		Beaver Field at Jim and Bettie Smith Stadium • Boone, NC	**L** 13-15	Haston (1-0)	**Roberts** (0-1)	Barquero (1)		220	13-14	6-3
Apr. 13	Wake Forest		Beaver Field at Jim and Bettie Smith Stadium • Boone, NC	**L** 0-12	Mascolo (2-1)	**Tujetsch** (0-2)	None	ESPN+	220	13-15	
Apr. 16	at Lipscomb		Dugan Field • Nashville, TN	**W** 9-5 (11 inns)	**Hall** (5-0)	Morgan (0-1)	None	ESPN+	197	14-15	
Apr. 17	at Lipscomb		Dugan Field • Nashville, TN	**L** 2-4	Bierman (2-3)	**Martinez** (3-5)	Maldonado (1)	YouTube	227	14-16	
Apr. 18	at Lipscomb		Dugan Field • Nashville, TN	**W** 4-3	'**Ellington** (2-0)	Williams (0-2)	**Terrell** (2)	ESPN+	207	15-16	
Apr. 20	Charlotte		Beaver Field at Jim and Bettie Smith Stadium • Boone, NC	**L** 8-11	Starnes (1-1)	**Roberts** (0-1)	Lothes (5)	ESPN+	190	15-17	
Apr. 23	at Troy		Riddle–Pace Field • Troy, AL	**L** 0-2	Gainous (6-3)	**Tuthill** (2-4)	Oates (3)	ESPN+	843	15-18	6-4
Apr. 24	at Troy		Riddle–Pace Field • Troy, AL	**L** 4-9	Ortiz (3-4)	**Cornatzer** (1-1)	None	ESPN+	804	15-19	6-5
Apr. 25	at Troy		Riddle–Pace Field • Troy, AL	**L** 2-12 (7 inns)	Witcher (4-2)	**Martinez** (3-6)	None	ESPN+	804	15-20	6-6
Apr. 27	NC State		Beaver Field at Jim and Bettie Smith Stadium • Boone, NC	**L** 3-7	Villaman (4-2)	**Tujetsch** (0-3)	None	ESPN+	220	15-21	
Apr. 30	Louisiana–Monroe		Beaver Field at Jim and Bettie Smith Stadium • Boone, NC	**W** 6-4	**Tuthill** (3-4)	Barnes (2-4)	**Hall** (2)	ESPN+	205	16-21	7-6

May (4–9)
Date	Opponent	Rank	Site/stadium	Score	Win	Loss	Save	TV	Attendance	Overall record	SBC record
May 1	Louisiana–Monroe		Beaver Field at Jim and Bettie Smith Stadium • Boone, NC	**L** 7-10	Jans (1-0)	**Hall** (5-1)	Orton (4)	ESPN+	210	16-22	7-7
May 2	Louisiana–Monroe		Beaver Field at Jim and Bettie Smith Stadium • Boone, NC	**L** 5-13 (8 inns.)	Longsworth (2-2)	**Tujetsch** (0-4)	None	ESPN+	200	16-23	7-8
May 7	at Miami		Alex Rodriguez Park at Mark Light Field • Coral Gables, FL	**L** 2-4	Rosario (5-4)	**Tuthill** (3-5)	Palmquist (11)	ACCN+	651	16-24	
May 8	at Miami		Alex Rodriguez Park at Mark Light Field • Coral Gables, FL	**L** 1-16	Smith (2-0)	**Tujetsch** (0-5)	None	ACCN+	653	16-25	
May 9	at Miami		Alex Rodriguez Park at Mark Light Field • Coral Gables, FL	**L** 2-10 (6 inns)	Mederos (2-3)	**Martinez** (3-7)	None	ACCN+	612	16-26	
May 11	East Tennessee State		Beaver Field at Jim and Bettie Smith Stadium • Boone, NC	**L** 5-10	Mercer (1-3)	**Terrell** (1-2)	None	ESPN+	190	16-27	
May 14	at Little Rock		Gary Hogan Field • Little Rock, AR	**W** 2-1	**Tuthill** (4-5)	Barkley (6-4)	None	ESPN+	329	17-27	8-8
May 15	at Little Rock		Gary Hogan Field • Little Rock, AR	**L** 2-4	Funk (2-5)	**Cornatzer** (1-2)	None	ESPN+	378	17-28	8-9
May 16	at Little Rock		Gary Hogan Field • Little Rock, AR	**W** 5-0	**Tujetsch** (1-5)	Weatherley (2-2)	**Ellington** (4)	ESPN+	271	18-28	9-9
May 18	at No. 21 South Carolina		Founders Park • Columbia, SC	**L** 0-2	Weins (1-0)	**Peterson** (1-3)	Sanders (1)	SECN+	2,538	18-29	
May 20	South Alabama		Beaver Field at Jim and Bettie Smith Stadium • Boone, NC	**W** 6-4	**Roberts** (1-0)	Smith (4-1)	**Papp** (1)	ESPN+	389	19-29	10-9
May 21	South Alabama		Beaver Field at Jim and Bettie Smith Stadium • Boone, NC	**W** 4-2	**Ellington** (3-0)	Lehrmann (3-3)	None	ESPN+	469	20-29	11-9
May 22	South Alabama		Beaver Field at Jim and Bettie Smith Stadium • Boone, NC	**L** 3-13 (7 inns)	Booker (7-0)	**Tujetsch** (1-6)	None	ESPN+	440	20-30	11-10

Post-season (1–1)

SBC Tournament (1–1)
Date	Opponent	Seed/Rank	Site/stadium	Score	Win	Loss	Save	TV	Attendance	Overall record	Tournament record
May 25	(6W) Texas State	(4E)	Montgomery Riverwalk Stadium • Montgomery, AL	**W** 1-0	**Peterson** (2-3)	Leigh (4-8)	**Ellington** (5)	ESPN+		21-30	1-0
May 26	vs. (1W) Louisiana	(4E)	Montgomery Riverwalk Stadium • Montgomery, AL	**L** 2-7	Talley (1-1)	**Tuthill** (4-6)	Arrighetti (2)	ESPN+		21-31	1-1

Schedule source:

*Rankings are based on the team's current ranking in the D1Baseball poll.

== Postseason ==
=== Conference accolades ===
- Player of the Year: Mason McWhorter – GASO
- Pitcher of the Year: Hayden Arnold – LR
- Freshman of the Year: Garrett Gainous – TROY
- Newcomer of the Year: Drake Osborn – LA
- Coach of the Year: Mark Calvi – USA

All Conference First Team

- Connor Cooke (LA)
- Hayden Arnold (LR)
- Carlos Tavera (UTA)
- Nick Jones (GASO)
- Drake Osborn (LA)
- Robbie Young (APP)
- Luke Drumheller (APP)
- Drew Frederic (TROY)
- Ben Klutts (ARST)
- Mason McWhorter (GASO)
- Logan Cerny (TROY)
- Ethan Wilson (USA)
- Cameron Jones (GSU)
- Ben Fitzgerald (LA)

All Conference Second Team

- JoJo Booker (USA)
- Tyler Tuthill (APP)
- Jeremy Lee (USA)
- Aaron Barkley (LR)
- BT Riopelle (CCU)
- Dylan Paul (UTA)
- Travis Washburn (ULM)
- Eric Brown (CCU)
- Grant Schulz (ULM)
- Tyler Duncan (ARST)
- Parker Chavers (CCU)
- Josh Smith (GSU)
- Andrew Miller (UTA)
- Noah Ledford (GASO)

== Rankings ==
Ranking movements Legend: ██ Increase in ranking ██ Decrease in ranking — = Not ranked RV = Received votes
	Week																
Poll	Pre	1	2	3	4	5	6	7	8	9	10	11	12	13	14	15	Final
Coaches'	—	—*	—	—	—	—	—	—	—	—	—						
Baseball America	—	—	—	—	—	—	—	—	—	—	—						
Collegiate Baseball^	RV	—	—	—	—	—	—	—	—	—	—						
NCBWA†	—	—	—	—	—	—	—	—	—	—	—						
D1Baseball	—	—	—	—	—	—	—	—	—	—	—						

^ Collegiate Baseball ranked 40 teams in their preseason poll, but only ranked 30 teams weekly during the season.
† NCBWA ranks 30 teams in their preseason poll, but only ranks 25 teams weekly during the season.
* A new poll was not released for this week, so for comparison purposes, the previous week's ranking is inserted in this week's slot.
