= 2021 Little Rock Trojans baseball team =

American college baseball season

2021 Little Rock Trojans baseball
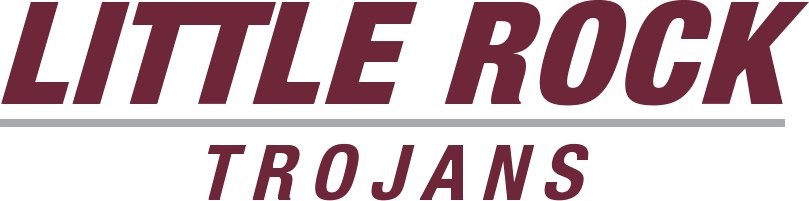
- Conference: Sun Belt Conference
- West Division
- Record: 21–30 (11–13 SBC)
- Head coach: Chris Curry (7th season)
- Assistant coaches: Noah Sanders; R. D. Spiehs
- Home stadium: Gary Hogan Field

2021 Sun Belt Conference baseball standings
	Conf.				Overall
Team	W		L	PCT	W		L	PCT
East Division
South Alabama ^{x}‍‍‡‍^{y}	15	–	9	.625	36	–	22	.621
Georgia Southern ‍‍‍	14	–	10	.583	34	–	23	.596
Troy ‍‍‍	13	–	11	.542	27	–	26	.509
Appalachian State ‍‍‍	11	–	10	.524	21	–	31	.404
Georgia State ‍‍‍	12	–	12	.500	18	–	37	.327
Coastal Carolina ‍‍‍	9	–	12	.429	27	–	24	.529
West Division
Louisiana ^{x}‍‍‍	13	–	11	.542	32	–	23	.582
UT Arlington ‍‍‍	13	–	11	.542	27	–	30	.474
Louisiana–Monroe ‍‍‍	11	–	13	.458	26	–	26	.500
Little Rock ‍‍‍	11	–	13	.458	21	–	30	.412
Arkansas State ‍‍‍	10	–	14	.417	19	–	30	.388
Texas State ‍‍‍	9	–	15	.375	21	–	36	.368
x – Division champion ‡ – Tournament champion y – Invited to the NCAA tournament As of June 7, 2021; Rankings from D1Baseball

The 2021 Little Rock Trojans baseball team represented the University of Arkansas at Little Rock during the 2021 NCAA Division I baseball season. The Trojans played their home games at Gary Hogan Field and were led by seventh-year head coach Chris Curry. They were members of the Sun Belt Conference.

== Preseason ==
=== Signing Day Recruits ===
Player	Hometown	Previous Team
Pitchers
Preston Davis	Texarkana, Texas	Redwater HS
Ezra Gustafson	Midwest City, Oklahoma	Carl Albert HS
Asher Hastings	Little Rock, Arkansas	Joe T. Robinson HS
Tristan Hawkins	Benton, Arkansas	Benton HS
Michael Quevedo	Deltona, Florida	TNXL Academy
Hitters
Jaxson Anders	Greenbrier, Arkansas	Greenbrier HS
Traejon Blake	England, Arkansas	England HS
Aidan Garrett	Benton, Arkansas	Benton HS
Jarkevious Johnson	Cleveland, Mississippi	Cleveland Central HS
Graydon Martin	Texarkana, Arkansas	Arkansas HS

=== Sun Belt Conference Coaches Poll ===
The Sun Belt Conference Coaches Poll was released on February 15, 2021 and the Trojans were picked to finish fourth in the West Division.

Coaches poll (West)
Predicted finish	Team	Votes (1st place)
1	Texas State	65 (6)
2	UT Arlington	58 (4)
3	Louisiana	52 (2)
4	Little Rock	33
5	Louisiana–Monroe	27
6	Arkansas State	13

=== Preseason All-Sun Belt Team & Honors ===
- Aaron Funk (LR, Pitcher)
- Jordan Jackson (GASO, Pitcher)
- Conor Angel (LA, Pitcher)
- Wyatt Divis (UTA, Pitcher)
- Lance Johnson (TROY, Pitcher)
- Caleb Bartolero (TROY, Catcher)
- William Sullivan (TROY, 1st Base)
- Luke Drumheller (APP, 2nd Base)
- Drew Frederic (TROY, Shortstop)
- Cooper Weiss (CCU, 3rd Base)
- Ethan Wilson (USA, Outfielder)
- Parker Chavers (CCU, Outfielder)
- Rigsby Mosley (TROY, Outfielder)
- Eilan Merejo (GSU, Designated Hitter)
- Andrew Beesly (ULM, Utility)

== Roster ==
2021 Little Rock Trojans roster
Pitchers: 12 Reese Lansville - Sophomore; 14 Eli Sievert - Senior; 16 Jacob Weatherley - Freshman; 17 Aaron Funk - Senior; 18 Aaron Barkley - Senior; 19 Calvin Hunt - Sophomore; 25 Jack Decooman - Redshirt Junior; 26 Cal Beardsley - Senior; 27 Luke Wallner - Senior; 29 Matthew Davis - Freshman; 30 Hayden Arnold - Senior; 31 Chance Vaught - Freshman; 34 Dillon Delgadillo - Senior; 35 Zane Neves - Sophomore; 36 Austin Smith - Senior; 37 Erik McKnight - Sophomore; 39 Sawyer Smallwood - Junior; 40 John Boushelle - Senior; 44 Cole Evans - Senior	Catchers: 10 Anthony Socci - Junior; 23 Robert Diaz - Freshman; 28 John Michael Russ - Senior; 32 Jake Wright - Sophomore; Infielders: 1 Christian Bernabe - Sophomore; 2 Eldrige Figeuroa - Senior; 4 Chris Prentiss - Senior; 5 Miguel Soto - Junior; 6 Nathan Lyons - Junior; 9 Will Spears - Sophomore; 21 Jorden Hussein - Senior; 24 Canyon McWilliams - Senior; 33 Kobe Barnum - Senior; Outfielders: 7 Noah Dickerson - Redshirt Sophomore; 8 Tim Dixon - Senior; 13 Tyler Williams - Sophomore; 20 Kenny Rodriguez - Senior; 22 Marlon Lindsey - Junior

=== Coaching staff ===
2021 Little Rock Trojans coaching staff
- Chris Curry – Head Coach – 7th year
- Noah Sanders – Assistant Head Coach and Recruiting Coordinator – 4th year
- R. D. Spiehs – Assistant Head Coach – 3rd year
- Eric Hansen – Director of Operations/Player Development – 1st year
- Jacob Caples – Volunteer Assistant Coach

== Schedule and results ==
Legend
	Little Rock win
	Little Rock loss
	Postponement/Cancelation/Suspensions
**Bold**	Little Rock team member

2021 Little Rock Trojans baseball game log
Regular season (21-28)

February (2-4)
Date	Opponent	Rank	Site/stadium	Score	Win	Loss	Save	TV	Attendance	Overall record	SBC record
Feb. 21	at Oral Roberts		J. L. Johnson Stadium • Tulsa, OK	**W** 4-3	**Arnold** (1-0)	Rogen (0-1)	None		882	1-0	
Feb. 22	at Oral Roberts		J. L. Johnson Stadium • Tulsa, OK	**L** 3-7	Coffey (1-0)	**DeCooman** (0-1)	None		519	1-1	
Feb. 23	at No. 20 Oklahoma State		O'Brate Stadium • Stillwater, OK	Cancelled							
Feb. 24	at No. 20 Oklahoma State		O'Brate Stadium • Stillwater, OK	**L** 2-7	Cheney (1-0)	**McKnight** (0-1)	None		2,635	1-2	
Feb. 26	Eastern Illinois		Gary Hogan Field • Little Rock, AR	**L** 6-12	Hampton (2-0)	**Funk** (0-1)	Doherty (1)		75	1-3	
Feb. 26	Eastern Illinois		Gary Hogan Field • Little Rock, AR	**L** 1-17 (7 inns)	Nicholson (1-0)	**Arnold** (1-1)	None		240	1-4	
Feb. 27	Eastern Illinois		Gary Hogan Field • Little Rock, AR	**W** 6-5	**Barkley** (1-0)	Stevenson (0-1)	None		185	2-4	

March (9-4)
Date	Opponent	Rank	Site/stadium	Score	Win	Loss	Save	TV	Attendance	Overall record	SBC record
Mar. 3	Central Arkansas		Gary Hogan Field • Little Rock, AR	**W** 5-3	**Evans** (1-0)	Gregson (0-1)	**Barkley** (1)		294	3-4	
Mar. 5	at North Alabama		Mike D. Lane Field • Florence, AL	**L** 4-6	Nichols (1-0)	**Hunt** (0-1)	None		157	3-5	
Mar. 6	at North Alabama		Mike D. Lane Field • Florence, AL	**W** 9-1	**Barkley** (2-0)	Best (0-2)	None		210	4-5	
Mar. 7	at North Alabama		Mike D. Lane Field • Florence, AL	**W** 10-3	**Weatherley** (1-0)	Moore (0-2)	None		209	5-5	
Mar. 12	at Auburn		Plainsman Park • Auburn, AL	**L** 0-7	Greenhill (2-0)	**Funk** (0-2)	None	SECN+	850	5-6	
Mar. 13	at Auburn		Plainsman Park • Auburn, AL	**L** 0-6	Barnett (2-0)	**Arnold** (1-2)	None	SECN+	850	5-7	
Mar. 14	at Auburn		Plainsman Park • Auburn, AL	**W** 12-6	**Barkley** (3-0)	Bright (2-1)	None	SECN+	850	6-7	
Mar. 19	Texas State		Gary Hogan Field • Little Rock, AR	**W** 2-1 (11 inns)	**Barkley** (1-0)	Wofford (1-1)	None	ESPN+	212	7-7	1-0
Mar. 20	Texas State		Gary Hogan Field • Little Rock, AR	**W** 12-0	**Arnold** (2-2)	Bush (1-2)	None	ESPN+	238	8-7	2-0
Mar. 21	Texas State		Gary Hogan Field • Little Rock, AR	**W** 7-4	**Weatherley** (2-0)	Nicholas (0-1)	**Barkley** (2)	ESPN+	254	9-7	3-0
Mar. 23	at Arkansas–Pine Bluff		Torii Hunter Baseball Complex • Pine Bluff, AR	Game Cancelled							
Mar. 26	at Southern Illinois		Itchy Jones Stadium • Carbondale, IL	**L** 7-10	McDaniel (1-0)	**Barkley** (4-1)	None			9-8	
Mar. 27	at Southern Illinois		Itchy Jones Stadium • Carbondale, IL	**W** 11-5	**Arnold** (3-2)	Chapman (5-1)	None			10-8	
Mar. 28	at Southern Illinois		Itchy Jones Stadium • Carbondale, IL	**W** 11-5	**Barkley** (5-1)	McDaniel (1-1)	None			11-8	
Mar. 30	Arkansas–Pine Bluff		Gary Hogan Field • Little Rock, AR	**W** 7-2	**Delgadillo** (1-0)	Wasson (0-1)	None		207	12-8	

April (6-10)
Date	Opponent	Rank	Site/stadium	Score	Win	Loss	Save	TV	Attendance	Overall record	SBC record
Apr. 1	at Arkansas State		Tomlinson Stadium–Kell Field • Jonesboro, AR	**L** 2-10	Hudson (2-0)	**Funk** (0-3)	Jumpers (2)	ESPN+	405	12-9	3-1
Apr. 2	at Arkansas State		Tomlinson Stadium–Kell Field • Jonesboro, AR	**L** 0-4	Jeans (1-0)	**Arnold** (3-3)	None	ESPN+	422	12-10	3-2
Apr. 3	at Arkansas State		Tomlinson Stadium–Kell Field • Jonesboro, AR	**L** 6-10	Holt (1-2)	**DeCooman** (0-2)	None	ESPN+	510	12-11	3-3
Apr. 6	at No. 2 Arkansas		Baum–Walker Stadium • Fayetteville, AR	**L** 2-7	Costeiu (4-0)	**Smallwood** (0-1)	None	SECN+	4,225	12-12	
Apr. 7	at No. 2 Arkansas		Baum–Walker Stadium • Fayetteville, AR	**L** 3-10	Bolden (1-0)	**Evans** (1-1)	None	SECN+	4,002	12-13	
Apr. 9	South Alabama		Gary Hogan Field • Little Rock, AR	**W** 7-3	**Arnold** (4-3)	Lee (2-2)	**Barkley** (3)	ESPN+	204	13-13	4-3
Apr. 10	South Alabama		Gary Hogan Field • Little Rock, AR	**W** 4-2	**Funk** (1-3)	Boswell (2-1)	**Barkley** (4)	ESPN+	432	14-13	5-3
Apr. 11	South Alabama		Gary Hogan Field • Little Rock, AR	**W** 9-8	**Hunt** (1-1)	Samaniego (1-1)	None	ESPN+	436	15-13	6-3
Apr. 13	at Central Arkansas		Bear Stadium • Conway, AR	**L** 2-4	Moyer (2-3)	**Beardsley** (0-1)	Cleveland (5)		345	15-14	
Apr. 17	at Louisiana–Monroe		Warhawk Field • Monroe, LA	**W** 2-0	**Arnold** (5-3)	Barnes (1-3)	**Barkley** (5)		618	16-14	7-3
Apr. 18	at Louisiana–Monroe		Warhawk Field • Monroe, LA	**L** 3-5	Barlow (4-4)	**Funk** (1-4)	Lindsay (2)		578	16-15	7-4
Apr. 19	at Louisiana–Monroe		Warhawk Field • Monroe, LA	**L** 4-5 (10 inns)	Goleman (1-1)	**Barkley** (5-2)	None		494	16-16	7-5
Apr. 20	at No. 12 Ole Miss		Swayze Field • Oxford, MS	**L** 6-11	Kimbrell (4-0)	**Vaught** (0-1)	None	SECN+	6,851	16-17	
Apr. 23	Louisiana		Gary Hogan Field • Little Rock, AR	**W** 8-2	**Arnold** (6-3)	Arrighetti (6-3)	**Barkley** (6)	ESPN+	256	17-17	8-5
Apr. 24	Louisiana		Gary Hogan Field • Little Rock, AR	**W** 4-3 (10 inns)	**Delgadillo** (2-0)	Nelson (1-1)	None	ESPN+	490	18-17	9-5
Apr. 25	Louisiana		Gary Hogan Field • Little Rock, AR	**L** 4-7	Dixon (2-0)	**Wallner** (0-1)	Talley (5)	ESPN+	390	18-18	9-6

May (3–10)
Date	Opponent	Rank	Site/stadium	Score	Win	Loss	Save	TV	Attendance	Overall record	SBC record
May 1	at UT Arlington		Clay Gould Ballpark • Arlington, TX	**L** 0-1 (11 inns)	King (3-0)	**Evans** (1-2)	None	ESPN+	314	18-19	9-7
May 2	at UT Arlington		Clay Gould Ballpark • Arlington, TX	**L** 4-5	Wong (3-1)	**Barkley** (5-3)	King (2)	ESPN+	314	18-20	9-8
May 2	at UT Arlington		Clay Gould Ballpark • Arlington, TX	**L** 0-3	Moffat (4-3)	**DeCooman** (0-3)	Austin (2)	ESPN+	314	18-21	9-9
May 7	at Sam Houston State		Don Sanders Stadium • Huntsville, TX	**W** 5-3	**Barkley** (6-3)	Dillard (1-4)	None		462	19-21	
May 8	at Sam Houston State		Don Sanders Stadium • Huntsville, TX	**L** 4-9	Wesneski (2-1)	**Funk** (1-5)	Atkinson (2)		462	19-22	
May 9	at Sam Houston State		Don Sanders Stadium • Huntsville, TX	**L** 4-8	Backhus (4-0)	**Weatherley** (2-1)	None		462	19-23	
May 12	at No. 18 Ole Miss		Swayze Field • Oxford, MS	**L** 4-9	Miller (1-1)	**Wallner** (0-2)	None	SECN+	6,703	19-24	
May 14	Appalachian State		Gary Hogan Field • Little Rock, AR	**L** 1-2	Tuthill (4-5)	**Barkley** (6-4)	None	ESPN+	329	19-25	9-10
May 15	Appalachian State		Gary Hogan Field • Little Rock, AR	**W** 4-2	**Funk** (2-5)	Cornatzer (1-2)	**Barkley** (7)	ESPN+	378	20-25	10-10
May 16	Appalachian State		Gary Hogan Field • Little Rock, AR	**L** 0-5	Tujetsch (1-5)	**Weatherley** (2-2)	Ellington (4)	ESPN+	271	20-26	10-11
May 20	at Georgia State		Georgia State Baseball Complex • Decatur, GA	**W** 7-3	**Arnold** (7-3)	Jones (1-7)	None		239	21-26	11-11
May 21	at Georgia State		Georgia State Baseball Complex • Decatur, GA	**L** 0-5	Dawson (3-2)	**Funk** (2-6)	Watson (1)		278	21-27	11-12
May 22	at Georgia State		Georgia State Baseball Complex • Decatur, GA	**L** 10-11	Brandon (1-2)	**Barkley** (6-5)	Watson (2)		351	21-28	11-13

Postseason (0–2)

SBC Tournament (0–2)
Date	Opponent	Seed/Rank	Site/stadium	Score	Win	Loss	Save	TV	Attendance	Overall record	Tournament record
May 25	vs. (6E) Coastal Carolina		Montgomery Riverwalk Stadium • Montgomery, AL	**L** 1-15 (7 inns)	Peavyhouse (3-2)	**Arnold** (7-4)	Joyce (1)	ESPN+		21-29	0-1
May 27	vs. (1E) South Alabama		Montgomery Riverwalk Stadium • Montgomery, AL	**L** 2-6	Michael (5-0)	**Evans** (1-3)	None	ESPN+		21-30	0-2

Schedule source:

*Rankings are based on the team's current ranking in the D1Baseball poll.

== Postseason ==
=== Conference accolades ===
- Player of the Year: Mason McWhorter – GASO
- Pitcher of the Year: Hayden Arnold – LR
- Freshman of the Year: Garrett Gainous – TROY
- Newcomer of the Year: Drake Osborn – LA
- Coach of the Year: Mark Calvi – USA

All Conference First Team

- Connor Cooke (LA)
- Hayden Arnold (LR)
- Carlos Tavera (UTA)
- Nick Jones (GASO)
- Drake Osborn (LA)
- Robbie Young (APP)
- Luke Drumheller (APP)
- Drew Frederic (TROY)
- Ben Klutts (ARST)
- Mason McWhorter (GASO)
- Logan Cerny (TROY)
- Ethan Wilson (USA)
- Cameron Jones (GSU)
- Ben Fitzgerald (LA)

All Conference Second Team

- JoJo Booker (USA)
- Tyler Tuthill (APP)
- Jeremy Lee (USA)
- Aaron Barkley (LR)
- BT Riopelle (CCU)
- Dylan Paul (UTA)
- Travis Washburn (ULM)
- Eric Brown (CCU)
- Grant Schulz (ULM)
- Tyler Duncan (ARST)
- Parker Chavers (CCU)
- Josh Smith (GSU)
- Andrew Miller (UTA)
- Noah Ledford (GASO)
