= Hayden Harris =

American baseball player (born 1999)

Colorado Rockies
- Pitcher
- Born: March 2, 1999 (age 27); Augusta, Georgia, U.S.
- Bats: Left Throws: Left

MLB debut
- September 2, 2025, for the Atlanta Braves

MLB statistics (through 2025 season)
- Win–loss record: 0–0
- Earned run average: 3.38
- Strikeouts: 0
- Stats at Baseball Reference

Teams
- Atlanta Braves (2025)

Hayden Lee Harris (born March 2, 1999) is an American professional baseball pitcher for the Colorado Rockies of Major League Baseball (MLB). He has previously played in MLB for the Atlanta Braves.

== Career ==
=== Atlanta Braves ===
Harris attended Grovetown High School in Grovetown, Georgia and played college baseball at Georgia Southern University, also playing collegiate summer baseball in 2021 with the Wisconsin Rapids Rafters. After college in 2022 he played for the exhibition barnstorming team the Savannah Bananas. He signed with the Atlanta Braves as an undrafted free agent on July 30, 2022.

Harris made his professional debut with the Florida Complex League Braves. He pitched 2023 with the Augusta GreenJackets, Rome Braves and Mississippi Braves. He started 2024 with Mississippi before being promoted to the Gwinnett Stripers. Harris was invited to spring training before the 2024 regular season began, and assigned to minor league camp in February. In September, Harris was assigned to the Peoria Javelinas of the Arizona Fall League.

Harris began the 2025 campaign with the Double-A Columbus Clingstones, later receiving a promotion to Gwinnett; in 39 appearances for the two affiliates, he compiled a cumulative 6-0 record and 0.56 ERA with 73 strikeouts and four saves. On September 2, 2025, Harris was selected to the 40-man roster and promoted to the major leagues for the first time. He made his debut the same day against the Chicago Cubs, pitching for a single inning. He was optioned to Triple-A Gwinnett on September 8. Over three games with the Braves, he pitched for 2 2/3 innings, recording two walks and one earned run.

Harris was optioned to Triple-A Gwinnett to begin the 2026 season. In 43 appearances split between Columbus and Gwinnett, he posted a cumulative 5.55 ERA with 64 strikeouts across 48 2/3 innings. On September 2, 2026, Harris was designated for assignment by Atlanta.

=== Colorado Rockies ===
On September 4, 2026, Harris was claimed off of waivers by the Colorado Rockies.
