= Lakeside High School (Evans, Georgia) =

Public high school in Evans, Georgia, United States

Location
- 533 Blue Ridge Drive; Evans, Georgia 30809; United States; 33.537780°N 82.100930°W

Information
- School type: Public, Public Secondary
- Motto: Panthers have pride!
- Opened: 1988
- School district: Columbia County School System
- Superintendent: Steven Flynt
- Principal: Juliet King
- Teaching staff: 103.60 (FTE)
- Grades: 9-12
- Enrollment: 1,909 (2023–2024)
- Student to teacher ratio: 18.43
- Colors: Maroon; Silver; Black
- Song: LHS Alma Mater
- Athletics conference: 3-AAAAAA
- Mascot: Panther
- Team name: Panthers
- Rival: Grovetown High School; Evans High School; Greenbrier High School
- Publication: The Lakeside Review
- Yearbook: Panthera
- Feeder schools: Lakeside Middle; Riverside Middle; Stallings Island Middle
- Website: lakesidehs.ccboe.net

Lakeside High School is a public high school located in Evans, Georgia, United States, in Columbia County.

== History ==
Construction was completed in 1988, and the first classes at the school started session that fall. The first students to graduate from Lakeside were mainly transfers from nearby Evans High School.

Lakeside's football stadium, Panther Stadium, was added to the campus in 1995, adjacent to Lakeside Middle School.

== Athletics ==
- Baseball
- Basketball (boys' and girls', varsity and JV)
- Cheerleading (varsity and JV for both football and basketball)
- Cross Country
- Dance Team
- Esports
- Football (varsity and JV), girl's flag football
- Golf
- Lacrosse (boys' and girls')
- Softball (varsity and JV)
- Soccer (boys' and girls', varsity and JV)
- Swimming (boys' and girls')
- Track
- Tennis
- Volleyball (varsity and JV)
- Wrestling (boys' and girls')

== Notable alumni ==
- Dave Haywood, member of country music group Lady Antebellum; guitar and background vocals
- Reese Hoffa, Olympic shot putter
- Charles Kelley, member of country music group Lady Antebellum; brother to artist Josh Kelley
- Josh Kelley, recording artist
- Keith Robinson, actor (Dreamgirls)
