= Chase Dollander =

American baseball player (born 2001)

Colorado Rockies – No. 32
- Pitcher
- Born: October 26, 2001 (age 24); Evans, Georgia, U.S.
- Bats: Right Throws: Right

MLB debut
- April 6, 2025, for the Colorado Rockies

MLB statistics (through 2026 season)
- Win–loss record: 5–15
- Earned run average: 5.70
- Strikeouts: 129
- Stats at Baseball Reference

Teams
- Colorado Rockies (2025–present)

Tyler Chase Dollander (born October 26, 2001) is an American professional baseball pitcher for the Colorado Rockies of Major League Baseball (MLB). He played college baseball for the Tennessee Volunteers and Georgia Southern Eagles. The Rockies selected him in the first round of the 2023 MLB draft.

== Early life ==
Tyler Chase Dollander was born on October 26, 2001, in Evans, Georgia. He attended Greenbrier High School in Evans where he played baseball. In 2018, his sophomore season, he went 5–3 with a 2.36 ERA. As a junior in 2019, he went 6–1 with a 0.79 ERA and 71 strikeouts over 61 2/3 innings. He went unselected in the 2020 Major League Baseball draft, and enrolled at Georgia Southern University to play college baseball.

== College career ==
As a freshman at Georgia Southern in 2021, Dollander made 11 starts, going went 4–3 with a 4.04 ERA and 64 strikeouts over 49 innings. After the season, he transferred to the University of Tennessee. He spent the 2022 season in their starting rotation, although he missed three weeks of the season after being hit by a line drive. Over 16 games (14 starts), he went 10–0 with a 2.39 ERA and 108 strikeouts over 79 innings. He was named the Southeastern Conference Pitcher of the Year. Dollander entered the 2023 season as a top prospect for upcoming MLB draft. In his final season with the Volunteers, he started 17 games and went 7–6 with a 4.75 ERA and 120 strikeouts over 89 innings.

== Professional career ==
Dollander was selected by the Colorado Rockies in the first round with the ninth overall pick in the 2023 Major League Baseball draft. He signed with the Rockies on July 17, for $5,716,900.

Dollander was assigned to the Spokane Indians to open the 2024 season, marking his professional debut. He was promoted to the Hartford Yard Goats in mid-July. Over 23 starts between Spokane and Hartford, Dollander went 6–2 with a 2.59 ERA and 169 strikeouts over 118 innings.

Dollander was invited to his first major league spring training in 2025. He was assigned to the Albuquerque Isotopes to open the 2025 season.

On April 6, 2025, the Rockies promoted Dollander to the major leagues for the first time. He made his MLB debut that afternoon against the Athletics, recording the win after allowing four runs on seven hits with six strikeouts over five innings pitched. The Rockies placed Dollander on the injured list on May 22 with right forearm tightness and was activated on June 3. Dollander was optioned to Albuquerque on July 7, with Rockies manager Warren Schaeffer noting "he absolutely has things he needs to work on" and "he needs to work on his efficiency and getting deeper into games and throwing more strikes early in counts." On August 11, the Rockies recalled him to the majors. His season ended in mid-September when he went on the injured list with a patella tendon strain in his left knee. Across 21 starts for the Rockies during his rookie season, Dollander pitched to a 2-12 record, a 6.52 ERA, and 82 strikeouts over 98 innings.

Dollander was named to his first Opening Day roster in 2026, and the Rockies announced he would be pitching out of the bullpen. In his first 10 appearances (including three starts) for Colorado, Dollander compiled a 3-3 record and 3.89 ERA with 47 strikeouts across 44 innings pitched. On May 15, 2026, he was placed on the injured list due to a right elbow sprain. Dollander was transferred to the 60-day injured list on June 12. That same day, it was announced that Dollander would likely require surgery to repair UCL damage in the same elbow. He underwent a season–ending internal brace procedure on June 23.

== Personal life ==
Dollander's older brother, Hunter, was a pitcher at Georgia Gwinnett College Grizzlies then pitched professionally in the Chicago White Sox farm system in 2022 and 2023. They have two other siblings.
