= Grovetown High School =

School in Grovetown, Georgia, United States

Location
- 2010 Warrior Way; Grovetown, Georgia 30813; United States; 33.4991°N 82.23634°W

Information
- Motto: "Warriors Lead the Way"
- Established: August 10, 2009
- School board: Columbia County Board of Education
- School district: Columbia County School System
- Superintendent: Steven Flynt
- Principal: Andrew Young
- Teaching staff: 123.00 (FTE)
- Grades: 9–12
- Gender: Co-ed
- Age range: 13–19
- Enrollment: 2,280 (2023–2024)
- Average class size: 25
- Student to teacher ratio: 18.54
- Language: English
- Hours in school day: 7:35 AM–2:45 PM (7hrs 10mins)
- Campus size: 3000
- Colours: White, Gray, Blue, and Red
- Song: GTHS Alma Mater (Jupiter by Gustav Holst)
- Fight song: "Yea Grovetown Warriors!" Based on the Alabama Crimson Tide fight song "Yea Alabama!" by Epp Sykes
- Athletics conference: GHSA 2-AAAAAA
- Mascot: Warrior/War Eagle
- Nickname: GTHS, G-Town
- Team name: Warriors
- Rival: Greenbrier High School Lakeside High School Evans High School
- Newspaper: The Warrior Wrap Up
- Feeder schools: Grovetown Middle School, Columbia Middle School
- Website: grovetownhs.ccboe.net

Grovetown High School is located in Grovetown, Georgia, United States, in Columbia County, and opened on August 10, 2009. Its enrollment for the 2010-2011 school was approximately 1300 students; its most recent enrollment approached 2,100.

== Academics ==
In 2014, Grovetown was ranked as a 2014 Most Challenging High School by The Washington Post. In 2014 the school was recognized for its success with its Advanced Placement Program, receiving recognition as an AP Access & Support School, an AP Stem School, and an AP Stem Achievement School. Grovetown offers a large variety of academic classes to take, and many different career class options.

== Athletics ==
The soccer team were region champions in 2011, making it to the elite 8 in the state playoff, ultimately losing to Woodward Academy the eventual State champions. The wrestling team were the Columbia County champions in 2013–2014. The volleyball team were the 2010, 2011, 2014, and 2015 region champs. In the 2016–2017 school year, all sports teams won a region championship. During the 2017–2018 school year a girls lacrosse team was started. During the 2021–2022 school year, the boys' basketball team became state champions, Grovetown's first ever. The soccer team also became region champions. In the 2018 season, the Warrior football won their region championship in a game against Evans High School. After the 2021-2022 season, the Warriors basketball team won the State Championship in Class-AAAAAA boys, beating title rival Buford 66-59.

== Speech and Debate Team ==
The Grovetown High School Debate Team began in 2011. It competes in Lincoln-Douglas, Public Forum, and Policy Debate, as well as some individual events, including Extemporaneous, Impromptu and Prose/Poetry.

In 2011 it won runner-up to the state champion in the novice division of Lincoln-Douglas at the GFCA's 1st and 2nd Year State Championship.

In its third year, the team qualified 24 members to the GFCA Varsity State Championship, held at Stratford Academy. At the Varsity State Tournament, the team took the Championship in Lincoln Douglas Debate. Overall the team placed third in debate divisions. At the tournament the team's coach was recognized as the 2014 GFCA Speech Coach of the Year. It also qualified seven students to the National Speech and Debate Association Tournament in Public Forum, Lincoln-Douglas, Extemporaneous Speaking, and Congressional Debate.

After a long hiatus, the speech and debate team was revived in 2022 with 7 new members. The team became co-champions in the Lassiter Invitational Debate Tournament, and 4 members qualified for the Georgia Speech & Debate State Championship in Public Forum Debate.

The Debate team is affiliated with both the National Speech and Debate Association and the Georgia Forensic Coaches Association.

== Extra-curricular activates ==
=== Honors societies ===
Grovetown High School currently has 11 honors societies. A National honors society chapter, Mu Alpha Theta Chapter, Thespian society, National Art society chapter, Rho Kappa chapter, Science National Honors Society chapter, Tri-M Chapter, French Honors chapter, Spanish Honors Chapter, Delta Phi Alpha chapter, and an English Honors society chapter.

=== Grovetown Band Of Warriors ===
Grovetown offers numerous instrumentation music opportunities. Numerous large group concert bands are offered, a concert band, symphonic, and top group known as Warrior Winds are the school's main band classes. Grovetown also offers a percussion class and beginning band for those wanting to pick up an instrument. All groups consistently earn Superior ratings at LGPE performances, and also perform around the county for audiences.

Grovetown also has a marching band that serves more than 100 student a year. The group earns superior ratings at competitions, and also hosts Columbia County's only marching competition known as the Warrior invitational where bands come from all over the state annually. The marching band also performs in the Grovetown Christmas parade, outside of local activities, the band has performed parades in Walt Disney World and Macy's Thanksgiving Day Parade.

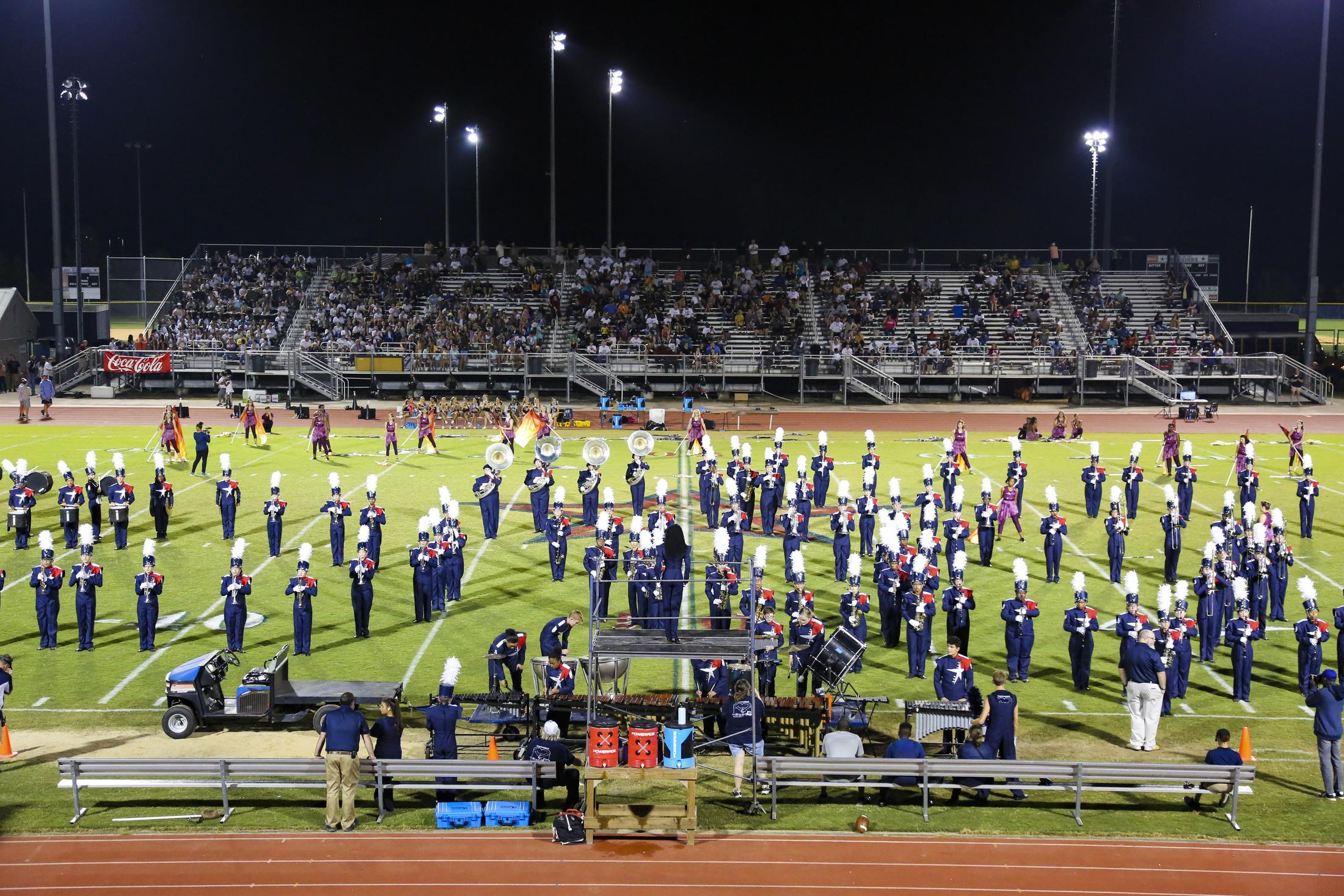
.

2009 - 2022 Marching Band Halftime Shows
Year	Title
2009	Everyday Heroes
2010	Friday Night Frights/Saturday Scares
2011	Top Gun
2012	Aliens vs. Warriors
2013	FUN & World Tour
2014	Dream On & DreamZzzzz
2015	Boundaries
2016	The Music Of Queen
2017	This Land
2018	Reflections: Marching Down Memory Lane
2019	A Love Remembered
2020	The Witching Hour
2021	Pirates Adventure
2022	Grovetown Goes To Motown!

== Notable alumni ==
- D'Ante Smith (2016), football player for the Cincinnati Bengals
- Hayden Harris (2017), baseball player in the Atlanta Braves organization
- Simeon Barrow (2020), football player for the Miami Hurricanes
- Derrion Reid (2024 - transferred), basketball player for the Alabama Crimson Tide
