= Grovetown, Georgia =

- City
- Logo
- Motto: A community that cares
- Location in Columbia County and the state of Georgia
- Coordinates: 33°26′58″N 82°11′49″W
- Country: United States
- State: Georgia
- County: Columbia
- Incorporated: January 1, 1881; 145 years ago

Government
  - Mayor: Gary Jones

Area
  - Total: 5.29 sq mi (13.69 km^{2})
  - Land: 5.27 sq mi (13.65 km^{2})
  - Water: 0.012 sq mi (0.03 km^{2})
- Elevation: 482 ft (147 m)

Population (2020)
  - Total: 15,577
  - Density: 2,954.7/sq mi (1,140.81/km^{2})
- est.
- Time zone: UTC-5 (Eastern (EST))
  - Summer (DST): UTC-4 (EDT)
- ZIP Code: 30813
- Area code: 706
- FIPS code: 13-35716
- GNIS feature ID: 356123
- Website: cityofgrovetown.com

Grovetown is a city in Columbia County, Georgia, United States. It is part of the Augusta metropolitan area as well as the Central Savannah River Area. As of the 2020 census, Grovetown had a population of 15,577. As of September 2026, the current mayor is Gary Jones.

== History ==
From the building of the Georgia Railroad, which travels through the city until at least the 1860s, the community was known as "Belair". The city was chartered by the Georgia Legislature and officially incorporated on January 1, 1881. The name of the small village purportedly came from the old Grove Baptist Church that was founded in 1808. A poet famous in the post-Civil War era, Paul Hamilton Hayne, moved to Copse Hill in the Parham Road area in the 1860s. He solicited the United States Postal Service to establish the Grovetown post office. The first U.S. mail service was inaugurated on September 28, 1877, with Charles Clifford as postmaster. Mr. Clifford was also the train depot agent and the owner of the corner store.

The first railroad depot was a small structure built in 1878–79. The last depot was an ornate structure built in 1891 at a cost of $5,041.74. It served the citizens of Grovetown until 1970, when passenger trains no longer traveled on the Augusta–Atlanta line. It was demolished in 1973.

Many wealthy and influential Augusta residents had summer homes in Grovetown, escaping the heat and disease of the city. They commuted on the old "Picayune" train, relying on its frequent service. The Rosland Hotel, later known as the "Eagle", was built in the 1880s. Its huge rotunda was frequently used for church gatherings, suppers, parties, and dances. It later became a boarding house and burned in the 1970s. The Church of Christ is now located on the site.

Several country stores were established on Old Wrightsboro Road near the railroad crossing. One was S. F. Poole's store, where the gazebo now stands at the corner with Robinson Avenue, with a "philosophers' bench" by the door. During the early days, many famous residents lived in the Grovetown area: Hayne, the literary figure; Stewart Phinizy and James Tobin, cotton brokers; Charles Phinizy, banker and railroad president; Dr. H. H. Steiner, physician; and John Dodge, pharmacist and harness racing enthusiast. Dodge brought his stable from Ohio and built a large home and racetrack.

With the construction of Camp Gordon in 1942, Grovetown experienced rapid growth; it was no longer a small agricultural town. Due to its close proximity to Fort Gordon, many military families looked to Grovetown for housing. Gradually, more and more retired military saw the benefits of living in the small town and population began to grow and stabilize.

Annexation and multi-housing construction has increased the population of the formerly quiet town. Currently, Grovetown has a population of approximately 15,000, up from the 1990 census figure of 3,596. A variety of stores, dining establishments, schools, and churches add to the town's culture. Services include recreational facilities, a public safety department, two fire stations, water and sewer services, a senior center, and museum.

On October 10, 2025, a freight train collided with a 18-wheeler truck which became stuck while crossing a railroad at the intersection of Katherine Street and Old Wrightsboro Road. This was the third incident involving the railroad crossing since 2002.

== Geography ==
Grovetown is located in southern Columbia County. Downtown Augusta is 15 miles (24 km) east. The northern boundary of Fort Gordon is 2 miles (3 km) south.

According to the United States Census Bureau, Grovetown has a total area of 4.8 square miles (12.5 km^{2}), of which 0.01 square miles (0.03 km^{2}), or 0.23%, is water.

=== Climate and weather extremes ===
Grovetown has yet had some extreme weather. The strongest tornado was an EF2 on October 31, 2019. Hurricane Helene hit the town on September 27, 2024. The highest temperature was 108 °F both on August 10, 2007, and on August 21, 1983. The coldest temperature was −1 °F set on January 21, 1985.

Climate data for Augusta Daniel Field Airport, Georgia (1991–2020 normals, (Note: Mean monthly maxima and minima (i.e. the expected highest and lowest temperature readings at any point during the year or given month) calculated based on data at said location from 1991 to 2020.) extremes 1871–present (Note: Official records for Augusta were kept at downtown from February 1871 to March 1944, Daniel Field from April 1944 to June 1950, and at Daniel Field / Augusta Daniel Field since July 1950. For more information, see Threadex))
Month	Jan	Feb	Mar	Apr	May	Jun	Jul	Aug	Sep	Oct	Nov	Dec	Year
Record high °F (°C)	84 (29)	88 (31)	93 (34)	96 (36)	101 (38)	106 (41)	107 (42)	108 (42)	106 (41)	101 (38)	90 (32)	84 (29)	108 (42)
Mean maximum °F (°C)	76 (24)	79 (26)	85 (29)	89 (32)	94 (34)	98.2 (36.8)	100 (38)	99 (37)	95 (35)	89 (32)	82 (28)	73 (23)	101 (38)
Mean daily maximum °F (°C)	59.6 (15.3)	63.5 (17.5)	71.0 (21.7)	78.5 (25.8)	85.9 (29.9)	91.3 (32.9)	94.1 (34.5)	92.6 (33.7)	87.8 (31.0)	79.0 (26.1)	69.1 (20.6)	61.5 (16.4)	77.8 (25.4)
Daily mean °F (°C)	47.4 (8.6)	52.1 (11.2)	57.5 (14.2)	64.6 (18.1)	72.7 (22.6)	79.7 (26.5)	80.9 (27.2)	81.8 (27.7)	76.4 (24.7)	66.0 (18.9)	55.6 (13.1)	49.4 (9.7)	65.4 (18.6)
Mean daily minimum °F (°C)	35.3 (1.8)	38.1 (3.4)	44.1 (6.7)	50.1 (10.1)	59.6 (15.3)	70.3 (21.3)	71.6 (22.0)	71.0 (21.7)	65.0 (18.3)	53.1 (11.7)	42.2 (5.7)	37.3 (2.9)	53.0 (11.7)
Mean minimum °F (°C)	18 (−8)	21 (−6)	26 (−3)	34 (1)	44 (7)	60.2 (15.7)	63 (17)	61 (16)	50 (10)	35 (2)	25 (−4)	19 (−7)	16 (−9)
Record low °F (°C)	−1 (−18)	3 (−16)	12 (−11)	26 (−3)	35 (2)	46 (8)	54 (12)	52 (11)	36 (2)	22 (−6)	11 (−12)	5 (−15)	−1 (−18)
Average precipitation inches (mm)	3.84 (98)	3.67 (93)	4.08 (104)	2.92 (74)	3.05 (77)	4.75 (121)	3.99 (101)	4.61 (117)	3.60 (91)	2.56 (65)	2.66 (68)	3.87 (98)	44.09 (1,120)
Average snowfall inches (cm)	0.4 (1.0)	0.3 (0.76)	0.0 (0.0)	0.0 (0.0)	0.0 (0.0)	0.0 (0.0)	0.0 (0.0)	0.0 (0.0)	0.0 (0.0)	0.0 (0.0)	0.0 (0.0)	0.1 (0.25)	0.8 (2.0)
Average precipitation days (≥ 0.01 in)	9.9	10.2	8.6	7.6	7.9	11.1	8.3	11.1	7.9	6.4	7.0	9.4	107.3
Average snowy days (≥ 0.1 in)	0.4	0.1	0.0	0.0	0.0	0.0	0.0	0.0	0.0	0.0	0.0	0.1	0.5
Average relative humidity (%)	69.8	65.8	65.0	64.5	69.6	71.3	73.9	76.5	76.2	73.3	71.9	71.6	70.8
Source: NWS Climate Summaries

== Demographics ==
Historical population
Census	Pop.	Note	%±
1900	527		—
1910	558		5.9%
1920	425		−23.8%
1930	267		−37.2%
1960	1,396		—
1970	3,169		127.0%
1980	3,384		6.8%
1990	3,596		6.3%
2000	6,089		69.3%
2010	11,216		84.2%
2020	15,577		38.9%
2025 (est.)	17,939	▲	15.2%
U.S. Decennial Census; 2025

=== 2020 census ===
As of the 2020 census, Grovetown had a population of 15,577. The median age was 29.9 years. 30.1% of residents were under the age of 18 and 7.0% of residents were 65 years of age or older. For every 100 females there were 94.9 males, and for every 100 females age 18 and over there were 91.5 males age 18 and over.

99.4% of residents lived in urban areas, while 0.6% lived in rural areas.

There were 5,417 households in Grovetown, of which 46.0% had children under the age of 18 living in them. Of all households, 49.1% were married-couple households, 17.2% were households with a male householder and no spouse or partner present, and 27.1% were households with a female householder and no spouse or partner present. About 20.8% of all households were made up of individuals and 4.8% had someone living alone who was 65 years of age or older.

There were 5,909 housing units, of which 8.3% were vacant. The homeowner vacancy rate was 3.6% and the rental vacancy rate was 9.3%.

There were 2,986 families residing in the city.

Grovetown racial composition as of 2020
Race	Num.	Perc.
White (non-Hispanic)	6,309	40.5%
Black or African American (non-Hispanic)	5,492	35.26%
Native American	36	0.23%
Asian	380	2.44%
Pacific Islander	42	0.27%
Other/Mixed	1,133	7.27%
Hispanic or Latino	2,185	14.03%

== Parks and recreation ==
City parks include the Liberty Park Community Center, and Goodale Park, which is named after Joseph Daniel "Danny" Goodale Jr., a Vietnam veteran who died in 1969. The city has also added Kiddie Park, as well as Historical Park. Friendship Park is located at the Veterans wall on Robinson Ave and is referred to as Freedom Park. They also have a Wildflower Park at the corner of Robinson Ave. and Johns Street.

== Education ==
It is in the Columbia County School District, which has boundaries paralleling that of Columbia County.

Grovetown Middle School, Grovetown Elementary School, Grovetown High School, and Cedar Ridge Elementary School are located in the city limits of Grovetown. Columbia Middle School, Brookwood Elementary School, Euchee Creek Elementary School, and Baker Place Elementary School are located near the city.

== Infrastructure ==
=== Transportation ===
Grovetown is mainly served by Georgia State Route 223 (SR 223), locally known as Robinson Avenue from just northwest of Fort Gordon's Gate 2 to the intersection with Harlem–Grovetown Road and as Wrightsboro Road past this point. It is also served by SR 388 east of this intersection. Here, SR 388 takes on the Wrightsboro Road name until an intersection with Katherine Street. At this intersection, the state highway turns left onto Horizon South Parkway, while Wrightsboro Road continues toward Augusta. Harlem–Grovetown Road connects the city with Harlem.

There are railroad tracks of CSX Transportation that extend through Grovetown, used mostly by freight trains.

== See also ==
- Central Savannah River Area
