= Greenbrier High School (Georgia) =

Public secondary high school in Evans, Georgia

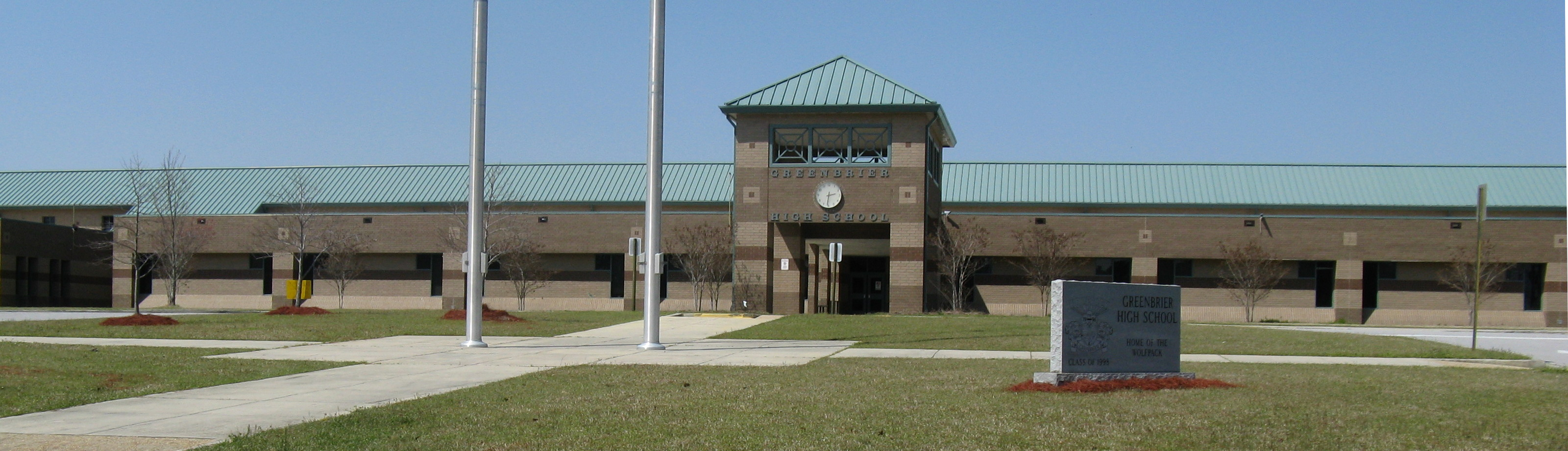

Location
- 5114 Riverwood Parkway; Evans, Georgia 30809; United States; 33°35′20″N 82°11′31″W

Information
- Type: Public secondary
- Founded: 1996
- School district: Columbia County School District
- NCES School ID: 1301141001501
- Principal: Dr. Michael Jones
- Teaching staff: 99.90 (FTE)
- Grades: 9–12
- Enrollment: 1,935 (2024-2025)
- Student to teacher ratio: 19.37
- Colors: Green and Gold
- Athletics: GHSA
- Athletics conference: 1-AAAAA
- Mascot: Wolf
- Team name: Wolfpack
- Rival: Grovetown, Evans, Lakeside
- Newspaper: The Greenbrier Dispatch
- Feeder schools: Columbia Middle, Greenbrier Middle, Riverside Middle School
- Website: School website

Greenbrier High School is a high school located in Evans, Georgia, a suburb of Augusta, Georgia, United States.

For the 2023–24 school year, Greenbrier High School enrolled more than 1,800 students in grades 9 through 12. The school has a 98.7% graduation rate, and a College and Career Ready Performance Index score of 87.5.

The school mascot is a wolf, and the school colors are hunter green, gold, grey, and white.

== Athletics ==
Greenbrier competed in the AAA classification from its founding in 1996 through 2000, in the AAAA classification from 2001 to 2009 and 2011–12, and in the AAAAA classification from 2009 to 2010 and again since 2013.

- Baseball (boys) state champions in 1997–1999, 2006–2007, and 2014–2015
- Soccer
- Softball state champions in 2004 and 2014
- Football
- Basketball
- Cross Country
- Track and Field
- Tennis
- E-sports
- Lacrosse
- Volleyball
- Golf
- Fishing
- Wrestling
- Flag Football state champions in 2023, 2024, and 2025
- Swimming

== Notable alumni ==
- Brandon Cumpton, professional baseball player
- Chase Dollander, professional baseball player
- Nick Sandlin, professional baseball player
