= Columbia County School System =

School district in Georgia (U.S. state)

Columbia County School District

Address
- 4781 Hereford Farm Road Evans, Georgia, 30809-6037; United States
- Coordinates: 33.530374°N 82.161780°W

District information
- Grades: Pre-school - 12
- Superintendent: Dr. Steven Flynt
- Accreditation(s): Southern Association of Colleges and Schools, Georgia Accrediting Commission

Students and staff
- Enrollment: About 28,100
- Faculty: 1,134

Other information
- Telephone: (706) 541-0650
- Website: www.ccboe.net

The Columbia County School District is a school district based in Columbia County, Georgia, United States. It is run by the Columbia County Board of Education with superintendent Dr. Steven W. Flynt . CCSD currently operates a total of 31 schools: 18 elementary schools, eight middle schools, five high schools, and an alternative school.

Its boundary is that of the county's.

== Elementary schools ==
- Baker Place Elementary School
- Blue Ridge Elementary School
- Brookwood Elementary School
- Cedar Ridge Elementary School
- Euchee Creek Elementary School
- Evans Elementary School
- Greenbrier Elementary School
- Grovetown Elementary School
- Lewiston Elementary School
- Martinez Elementary School
- North Columbia Elementary School
- North Harlem Elementary School
- Parkway Elementary School
- River Ridge Elementary School
- Riverside Elementary School
- South Columbia Elementary School
- Stevens Creek Elementary School
- Westmont Elementary School

== Middle schools ==
- Columbia Middle School
- Evans Middle School
- Greenbrier Middle School
- Grovetown Middle School
- Harlem Middle School
- Lakeside Middle School
- Riverside Middle School
- Stallings Island Middle School

== High schools ==
- Evans High School
- Greenbrier High School
- Grovetown High School
- Harlem High School
- Lakeside High School

== Alternative schools ==
- Columbia County Alternative School (CCAS)

== Former schools ==
- Bel-Air Elementary School - It opened in 1968, stopped operations in 2013, and was demolished in 2016.
