= 2021 Iowa Hawkeyes baseball team =

American college baseball season

2021 Iowa Hawkeyes baseball
- Conference: Big Ten Conference
- Record: 26–18 (26–18 Big Ten)
- Head coach: Rick Heller (8th season)
- Assistant coach: Marty Sutherland (8th season)
- Hitting coach: Jimmy Frankos (2nd season)
- Pitching coach: Robin Lund (3rd season)
- Home stadium: Duane Banks Field

2021 Big Ten Conference baseball standings
	Conf.				Overall
Team	W		L	PCT	W		L	PCT
No. 19 Nebraska ‍†‍‍^{y}	31	–	12	.721	34	–	14	.708
No. 24 Maryland ‍‍‍^{y}	28	–	16	.636	30	–	18	.625
Michigan ‍‍‍^{y}	27	–	17	.614	27	–	19	.587
Indiana ‍‍‍	26	–	18	.591	26	–	18	.591
Iowa ‍‍‍	26	–	18	.591	26	–	18	.591
Ohio State ‍‍‍	22	–	20	.524	22	–	20	.524
Illinois ‍‍‍	22	–	22	.500	22	–	22	.500
Rutgers ‍‍‍	21	–	23	.477	21	–	23	.477
Penn State ‍‍‍	18	–	24	.429	18	–	24	.429
Northwestern ‍‍‍	15	–	21	.417	15	–	21	.417
Michigan State ‍‍‍	17	–	27	.386	17	–	27	.386
Purdue ‍‍‍	16	–	26	.381	16	–	26	.381
Minnesota ‍‍‍	6	–	31	.162	6	–	31	.162
† – Conference champion y – Invited to the NCAA tournament As of June 7, 2021; Rankings from D1Baseball

The 2021 Iowa Hawkeyes baseball team was a baseball team that represented the University of Iowa in the 2021 NCAA Division I baseball season. The Hawkeyes were members of the Big Ten Conference and played their home games at Duane Banks Field in Iowa City, Iowa. They were led by eighth-year head coach Rick Heller.

== Previous season ==
The Hawkeyes finished the 2020 NCAA Division I baseball season 10–5 overall (0–0 conference) and first place in conference standings, as the season was cut short in stages by March 12 due to the COVID-19 pandemic.

== Preseason ==
For the 2021 Big Ten Conference poll, Iowa was voted to finish in fourth by the Big Ten Coaches.

== Roster ==
2021 Iowa Hawkeyes baseball team
Players
Coaches

#	Pos.	Name	B/T	Height	Weight	Year	Previous school	Home town
2	INF	Brendan Sher	R/R	6 ft 1 in (1.85 m)	200 lb (91 kg)	RS So	Indianola Community H. S.	Indianola, Iowa
3		Sam Link	R/R	6 ft 0 in (1.83 m)	195 lb (88 kg)	RS Fr	Dubuque Senior H. S.	Dubuque, Iowa
4		Brayden Frazier	R/R	6 ft 0 in (1.83 m)	195 lb (88 kg)	RS Fr	Jefferson H. S.	Cedar Rapids, Iowa
5		Zeb Adreon	L/L	6 ft 2 in (1.88 m)	219 lb (99 kg)	RS Sr	Southeastern C. C.	Pleasantville, Iowa
6		Alec Nigut (redshirt)	L/L	6 ft 0 in (1.83 m)	205 lb (93 kg)	Fr	Theodore Roosevelt H. S.	Des Moines, Iowa
7		Keaton Anthony (redshirt)	R/R	6 ft 4 in (1.93 m)	211 lb (96 kg)	Fr	Mill Creek H. S.	Hoschton, Georgia
8	OF	D. J. Heck	R/R	6 ft 0 in (1.83 m)	195 lb (88 kg)	RS Fr	Iowa City H. S.	Iowa City, Iowa
9	OF	Ben Norman	L/R	6 ft 2 in (1.88 m)	200 lb (91 kg)	RS Sr	Theodore Roosevelt H. S.	Des Moines, Iowa
10	RHP	Will Semb	R/R	6 ft 1 in (1.85 m)	180 lb (82 kg)	Fr	De Pere H. S.	De Pere, Wisconsin
11	RHP	Jackson Vines	R/R	6 ft 3 in (1.91 m)	205 lb (93 kg)	RS Fr	Johnston H. S.	Johnston, Iowa
12	RHP	Drew Irvine	S/R	6 ft 3 in (1.91 m)	180 lb (82 kg)	RS So	Waukee H. S.	Waukee, Iowa
13	INF	Michael Seegers	R/R	5 ft 10 in (1.78 m)	160 lb (73 kg)	Fr	Home School	Oconomowoc, Wisconsin
14		Andy Nelson	R/R	6 ft 0 in (1.83 m)	190 lb (86 kg)	Fr	Wheaton North H. S.	Winfield, Illinois
16	C	Tyler Snep	L/R	6 ft 2 in (1.88 m)	210 lb (95 kg)	RS Fr	Lake Zurich H. S.	Lake Zurich, Illinois
17		Dylan Nedved	R/R	6 ft 2 in (1.88 m)	190 lb (86 kg)	RS Jr	Hutchinson C. C.	Shawnee, Kansas
18	LHP	Rimmy Nemickas	L/L	6 ft 4 in (1.93 m)	215 lb (98 kg)	RS Fr	Washington H. S.	Cedar Rapids, Iowa
19	RHP	Ben Probst	R/R	6 ft 1 in (1.85 m)	205 lb (93 kg)	RS So	Dowling Catholic H. S.	Urbandale, Iowa
20	INF	Izaya Fullard	R/R	5 ft 11 in (1.8 m)	235 lb (107 kg)	RS Jr	Kirkwood C. C.	North Liberty, Iowa
22	RHP	Tyson James	R/R	6 ft 4 in (1.93 m)	255 lb (116 kg)	Fr	Webster Groves H. S.	Webster Groves, Missouri
24	RHP	Hunter Lee	R/R	6 ft 1 in (1.85 m)	225 lb (102 kg)	RS Jr	Kirkwood C. C.	Des Moines, Iowa
25	OF	Paul Vossen	L/R	5 ft 9 in (1.75 m)	160 lb (73 kg)	RS Fr	Bishop Manogue H. S.	Reno, Nevada
26	LHP	Adam Ketelsen	L/L	6 ft 3 in (1.91 m)	195 lb (88 kg)	RS Sr	Kirkwood C. C.	Mount Vernon, Iowa
27	RHP	Ty Langenberg	R/R	6 ft 2 in (1.88 m)	190 lb (86 kg)	Fr	Urbandale H. S.	Urbandale, Iowa
28		Anthony Mangano	L/R	6 ft 0 in (1.83 m)	185 lb (84 kg)	Fr	Lake Zurich H. S.	Lake Zurich, Illinois
29	LHP	Ben Beutel	L/L	6 ft 0 in (1.83 m)	165 lb (75 kg)	RS Jr	Allen C. C.	Davenport, Iowa
30		Connor McCaffery	L/L	6 ft 6 in (1.98 m)	215 lb (98 kg)	RS So	Iowa City West H. S.	Iowa City, Iowa
31	INF	Matthew Sosa	R/R	6 ft 2 in (1.88 m)	220 lb (100 kg)	RS Sr	East Los Angeles College	Whittier, California
32	C	Brett McCleary	R/R	6 ft 2 in (1.88 m)	225 lb (102 kg)	RS Jr	Iowa City H. S.	Iowa City, Iowa
33	LHP	Jack Dreyer	R/L	6 ft 2 in (1.88 m)	205 lb (93 kg)	RS So	Johnston H. S.	Johnston, Iowa
34	C	Austin Martin	R/R	6 ft 1 in (1.85 m)	205 lb (93 kg)	RS Sr	Southeastern C. C.	Altoona, Iowa
35	LHP	Cam Baumann	L/L	6 ft 2 in (1.88 m)	200 lb (91 kg)	RS Jr	Fairfield H. S.	Fairfield, Iowa
37	RHP	Jacob Henderson	R/R	6 ft 0 in (1.83 m)	180 lb (82 kg)	RS Fr	Mesquite H. S.	Gilbert, Arizona
38	OF	Trenton Wallace	L/L	6 ft 1 in (1.85 m)	200 lb (91 kg)	RS Jr	Assumption H. S.	Rock Island, Illinois
40	RHP	Jack Guzek	R/R	6 ft 4 in (1.93 m)	205 lb (93 kg)	RS So	Gulf Coast State College	Manhattan, Illinois
41	LHP	Jack Radford	L/L	6 ft 4 in (1.93 m)	235 lb (107 kg)	RS So	South Mountain C. C.	Lakewood, Colorado
42	RHP	Trace Hoffman	R/R	6 ft 1 in (1.85 m)	180 lb (82 kg)	RS Sr	Southeastern C. C.	Cascade, Iowa
43	RHP	Grant Leonard	R/R	6 ft 0 in (1.83 m)	180 lb (82 kg)	RS Sr	Lincoln-Way Central H. S.	Mokena, Illinois
44	RHP	Duncan Davitt	R/R	6 ft 3 in (1.91 m)	221 lb (100 kg)	RS So	Indianola Community H. S.	Indianola, Iowa
45	INF	Peyton Williams	L/L	6 ft 5 in (1.96 m)	250 lb (113 kg)	RS Fr	Johnston H. S.	Johnston, Iowa
50	RHP	Reece Lawler	R/R	6 ft 2 in (1.88 m)	190 lb (86 kg)	Fr	Warren Township H. S.	Gurnee, Illinois
51	RHP	Jackson Payne	R/R	6 ft 4 in (1.93 m)	180 lb (82 kg)	Fr	Waukee H. S.	Clive, Iowa

Head coach

Rick Heller

Assistant coach(es)

Hitting coach(es)

Jimmy Frankos

Base coach(es)

Marty Sutherland

Pitching coach(es)

Robin Lund

Legend

- (C) Team captain
- (S) Suspended
- (I) Ineligible
- Injured
- Current redshirt

Roster
Last update: March 7, 2021

== Schedule ==
2021 Iowa Hawkeyes baseball game log
Regular season
March (7–8)

#	Date	Opponent	Site/stadium	Score	Win	Loss	Save	Attendance	Overall record	B1G record
1	March 6	vs Michigan	Dell Diamond • Round Rock, Texas	2–4	Weiss (1–0)	Beutel (0–1)	None	–	0–1	0–1
2	March 7	vs Michigan	Dell Diamond • Round Rock, Texas	8–3	Nedved (1–0)	Weston (0–1)	None	150	1–1	1–1
3	March 7	vs Michigan	Dell Diamond • Round Rock, Texas	0–7	Denner (1–0)	Baumann (0–1)	None	150	1–2	1–2
4	March 8	vs Michigan	Dell Diamond • Round Rock, Texas	4–11	Dragani (1–0)	Lee (0–1)	None	150	1–3	1–3
5	March 12	vs Ohio State	U.S. Bank Stadium • Minneapolis, Minnesota	4–0	Wallace (1–0)	Lonsway (0–1)	Nedved (2)	250	2–3	2–3
6	March 13	vs Nebraska	U.S. Bank Stadium • Minneapolis, Minnesota	0–4	Hrock (2–0)	Irvine (0–1)	Schwellenbach (1)	250	2–4	2–4
7	March 13	vs Ohio State	U.S. Bank Stadium • Minneapolis, Minnesota	4–7	Murphy (1–0)	Baumann (0–2)	Brock (1)	50	2–5	2–5
8	March 14	vs Nebraska	U.S. Bank Stadium • Minneapolis, Minnesota	3–1	Davitt (1–0)	Bunz (0–1)	Nedved (2)	250	3–5	3–5
9	March 19	Nebraska	Duane Banks Field • Iowa City, Iowa	3–0	Wallace (2–0)	Povich (1–1)	Hoffman (1)	309	4–5	4–5
10	March 20	Nebraska	Duane Banks Field • Iowa City, Iowa	8–10	Bragg (1–1)	Irvine (0–2)	Schwellenbach (2)	350	4–6	4–6
11	March 21	Nebraska	Duane Banks Field • Iowa City, Iowa	8–13	Martin (1–0)	Davitt (1–1)	None	329	4–7	4–7
12	March 26	at Ohio State	Bill Davis Stadium • Columbus, Ohio	2–8	Burhenn (1–1)	Wallace (2–1)	None	205	4–8	4–8
13	March 27	at Ohio State	Bill Davis Stadium • Columbus, Ohio	5–1	Baumann (2–1)	Lonsway (0–3)	Nedved (3)	–	5–8	5–8
14	March 27	Maryland	Bill Davis Stadium • Columbus, Ohio	6–4	Hoffman (1–0)	Ramsey (0–1)	Nedved (4)	–	6–8	6–8
15	March 28	Maryland	Bill Davis Stadium • Columbus, Ohio	11–2	Davitt (2–1)	Staine (0–2)	None	–	7–8	7–8

April (12–3)

#	Date	Opponent	Site/stadium	Score	Win	Loss	Save	Attendance	Overall record	B1G record
16	April 2	at Purdue	Alexander Field • West Lafayette, Indiana	4–2	Nedved (2–0)	Weins (0–1)	None	479	8–8	8–8
17	April 3	at Purdue	Alexander Field • West Lafayette, Indiana	8–10	Brooks (1–1)	Guzek (0–1)	Cook (1)	496	8–9	8–9
18	April 4	at Purdue	Alexander Field • West Lafayette, Indiana	8–5	Davitt (3–1)	Kulak (0–1)	None	534	9–9	9–9
19	April 9	Minnesota	Duane Banks Field • Iowa City, Iowa	7–1	Wallace (3–1)	Ireland (0–3)	None	639	10–9	10–9
20	April 11	Minnesota	Duane Banks Field • Iowa City, Iowa	6–1	Irvine (1–2)	Liffrig (1–2)	Nedved (5)	985	11–9	11–9
21	April 11	Minnesota	Duane Banks Field • Iowa City, Iowa	18–0	Baumann (2–2)	Schoeberl (0–2)	None	985	12–9	12–9
22	April 16	at Rutgers	Bainton Field • Piscataway, New Jersey	14–12	Hoffman (2–0)	Muller (1–1)	None	200	13–9	13–9
23	April 17	at Rutgers	Bainton Field • Piscataway, New Jersey	3–1	Irvine (2–2)	Wereski (4–2)	None	200	14–9	14–9
24	April 17	at Rutgers	Bainton Field • Piscataway, New Jersey	8–1	Baumann (3–2)	Fitzpatrick (2–2)	None	200	15–9	15–9
25	April 18	at Rutgers	Bainton Field • Piscataway, New Jersey	7–8	Reardon (1–0)	Leonard (0–1)	None	200	15–10	15–10
26	April 23	Maryland	Duane Banks Field • Iowa City, Iowa	6–2	Hoffman (3–0)	Burke (2–3)	Nedved (6)	528	16–10	16–10
27	April 24	Maryland	Duane Banks Field • Iowa City, Iowa	6–8	Dean (1–0)	Irvine (2–3)	Bello (5)	1,112	16–11	16–11
28	April 25	Northwestern	Duane Banks Field • Iowa City, Iowa	15–4	Baumann (4–2)	Lavelle (4–2)	None	657	17–11	17–11
29	April 26	Northwestern	Duane Banks Field • Iowa City, Iowa	12–9	Nedved (3–0)	Smith (1–3)	None	544	18–11	18–11
30	April 30	at Indiana	Bart Kaufman Field • Bloomington, Indiana	6–5	Wallace (4–1)	Sommer (5–2)	Nedved (7)	150	19–11	19–11

May (7–6)

#	Date	Opponent	Site/stadium	Score	Win	Loss	Save	Attendance	Overall record	B1G record
31	May 1	at Indiana	Bart Kaufman Field • Bloomington, Indiana	6–12	Modugno (2–1)	Irvine (2–4)	Bothwell (1)	150	19–12	19–12
32	May 2	at Indiana	Bart Kaufman Field • Bloomington, Indiana	8–12	Bierman (4–2)	Baumann (4–3)	None	150	19–13	19–13
33	May 7	Penn State	Duane Banks Field • Iowa City, Iowa	4–2	Wallace (5–1)	Dees (3–3)	Nedved (8)	691	20–13	20–13
34	May 8	Penn State	Duane Banks Field • Iowa City, Iowa	5–3	Davitt (4–1)	Larkin (3–6)	Leonard (1)	0	21–13	21–13
35	May 9	Penn State	Duane Banks Field • Iowa City, Iowa	4–5	Virbitsky (3–3)	Baumann (4–4)	None	986	21–14	21–14
36	May 14	Illinois	Duane Banks Field • Iowa City, Iowa	5–4	Nedved (4–0)	Kirschsieper (3–4)	None	1,022	22–14	22–14
37	May 15	Illinois	Duane Banks Field • Iowa City, Iowa	1–14	Lavender (6–2)	Davitt (4–2)	Kutt (2)	1,165	22–15	22–15
38	May 16	Illinois	Duane Banks Field • Iowa City, Iowa	2–6	Gowens (2–3)	Baumann (4–5)	None	1,132	22–16	22–16
39	May 21	at Northwestern|	Rocky Miller Park • Evanston, Illinois	6–1	Wallace (6–1)	Doherty (1–4)	None	165	23–16	23–16
40	May 22	at Northwestern	Rocky Miller Park • Evanston, Illinois	4–5	Lawerence (2–0)	Nedved (4–1)	None	213	23–17	23–17
41	May 23	at Northwestern	Rocky Miller Park • Evanston, Illinois	6–8	Pate (1–0)	Irvine (2–5)	None	185	23–18	23–18
42	May 28	at Michigan State	Drayton McLane Baseball Stadium at John H. Kobs Field • East Lansing, Michigan	12–1	Wallace (7–1)	Erla (5–6)	None	314	24–18	24–18
43	May 29	at Michigan State	Drayton McLane Baseball Stadium at John H. Kobs Field • East Lansing, Michigan	7–4	Davitt (4–3)	Jones (2–2)	Nedved (9)	320	25–18	25–18
44	May 30	at Michigan State	Drayton McLane Baseball Stadium at John H. Kobs Field • East Lansing, Michigan	11–3	Baumann (5–5)	Olson (0–1)	None	207	26–18	26–18

== Awards ==
=== Big Ten Conference Players of the Week ===
Weekly Awards
Player	Award	Date Awarded	Ref.
Trenton Wallace	Pitcher of the Week	March 23, 2021	
Ben Norman	Player of the Week	April 20, 2021	
Zeb Adreon	Player of the Week	April 27, 2021	

=== Conference awards ===
Awards
Player	Award	Date Awarded	Ref.
Trenton Wallace	Big Ten Pitcher of the Year	May 30, 2021	
Ben Norman	First Team All-Big Ten	May 30, 2021	
Trenton Wallace	First Team All-Big Ten	May 30, 2021	
Izaya Fullard	Third Team All-Big Ten	May 30, 2021	

== 2021 MLB draft ==
Player	Position	Round	Overall	MLB team
Trenton Wallace	LHP	11	332	Toronto Blue Jays
Drew Irvine	RHP	19	553	Pittsburgh Pirates
