= 2021 Indiana Hoosiers baseball team =

American college baseball season

2021 Indiana Hoosiers baseball
- Conference: Big Ten Conference
- Record: 26-18 (26-18 Big Ten)
- Head coach: Jeff Mercer (3rd season)
- Pitching coach: Justin Parker (3rd season)
- Home stadium: Bart Kaufman Field (Capacity: 2,500)

2021 Big Ten Conference baseball standings
	Conf.				Overall
Team	W		L	PCT	W		L	PCT
No. 19 Nebraska ‍†‍‍^{y}	31	–	12	.721	34	–	14	.708
No. 24 Maryland ‍‍‍^{y}	28	–	16	.636	30	–	18	.625
Michigan ‍‍‍^{y}	27	–	17	.614	27	–	19	.587
Indiana ‍‍‍	26	–	18	.591	26	–	18	.591
Iowa ‍‍‍	26	–	18	.591	26	–	18	.591
Ohio State ‍‍‍	22	–	20	.524	22	–	20	.524
Illinois ‍‍‍	22	–	22	.500	22	–	22	.500
Rutgers ‍‍‍	21	–	23	.477	21	–	23	.477
Penn State ‍‍‍	18	–	24	.429	18	–	24	.429
Northwestern ‍‍‍	15	–	21	.417	15	–	21	.417
Michigan State ‍‍‍	17	–	27	.386	17	–	27	.386
Purdue ‍‍‍	16	–	26	.381	16	–	26	.381
Minnesota ‍‍‍	6	–	31	.162	6	–	31	.162
† – Conference champion y – Invited to the NCAA tournament As of June 7, 2021; Rankings from D1Baseball

The 2021 Indiana Hoosiers baseball team is a college baseball team that represents Indiana University in the 2021 NCAA Division I baseball season. The Hoosiers are members of the Big Ten Conference (B1G) and play their home games at Bart Kaufman Field in Bloomington, Indiana. They are led by third-year head coach Jeff Mercer.

== Previous season ==
The Hoosiers finished the 2020 NCAA Division I baseball season 9–6 overall (0–0 conference) and fifth place in conference standings. On March 12, 2020, the Big Ten Conference cancelled the remainder of all winter and spring sports seasons due to the coronavirus pandemic.

=== MLB draft ===
The following Hoosiers on the 2020 roster were selected in the 2020 Major League Baseball draft or signed in free agency:

List of Drafted Players
Name	2020 Class	Pos.	Team	Round	Signed/Returned
Elijah Dunham	Junior	OF	New York Yankees	Free Agency	Signed

== Preseason ==
Due to the ongoing COVID-19 pandemic, the B1G Conference delayed setting a season schedule, before releasing a truncated, all-conference schedule on February 17, 2021. In addition to the release of the schedule, the Big Ten also stated that the games will be played without fans this season.

=== Season projections ===
Coming off of a shortened season in 2020, the 2021 Hoosiers are projected to finish first in conference play by Perfect Game and second in conference play by D1Baseball. On March 4, the Big Ten Coaches voted the Hoosiers to finish second in the conference. The Hoosiers received preseason vote for rankings by Collegiate Baseball.

== Roster ==
2021 Indiana Hoosiers baseball team
Players
Coaches

#	Pos.	Name	B/T	Height	Weight	Year	Previous school	Home town
1	INF	Jeremy Houston	R/R	5 ft 7 in (1.7 m)	175 lb (79 kg)	Sr	Mount Carmel	Chicago, Illinois
2	INF	Cole Barr	R/R	5 ft 11 in (1.8 m)	195 lb (88 kg)	Jr	Yorktown	Yorktown, Indiana
3	INF	Drew Ashley	R/R	5 ft 11 in (1.8 m)	175 lb (79 kg)	Jr	Evansville Memorial	Chandler, Indiana
4	OF	Hunter Jessee	L/L	6 ft 0 in (1.83 m)	195 lb (88 kg)	Fr	Kings	South Lebanon, Ohio
5	INF	Paul Toetz	R/R	6 ft 0 in (1.83 m)	210 lb (95 kg)	Fr	Greendale	Greendale, Wisconsin
6	OF	Grant Richardson	L/L	6 ft 2 in (1.88 m)	210 lb (95 kg)	So	Fishers	Fishers, Indiana
7	OF	Ethan Vecrumba	L/R	6 ft 4 in (1.93 m)	220 lb (100 kg)	Fr	Edgewood	Bloomington, Indiana
9	RHP	Alex Franklin	R/R	6 ft 3 in (1.91 m)	225 lb (102 kg)	So	Bloomington South	Bloomington, Indiana
10	OF	Morgan Colopy	R/R	6 ft 1 in (1.85 m)	220 lb (100 kg)	So	Centerville	Centerville, Ohio
11	C	Collin Hopkins	R/R	5 ft 11 in (1.8 m)	200 lb (91 kg)	RS Sr	Ensworth	Nashville, Tennessee
12	RHP	Grant Macciocchi	R/R	6 ft 4 in (1.93 m)	200 lb (91 kg)	RS Sr	Moeller	West Chester, Ohio
13	INF	James Espalin	L/R	6 ft 0 in (1.83 m)	180 lb (82 kg)	Fr	Orange Lutheran	Glendora, California
14	RHP	Nathan Stahl	R/R	6 ft 3 in (1.91 m)	205 lb (93 kg)	Fr	Walsh Jesuit	Akron, Ohio
15	RHP	David Platt	R/R	6 ft 3 in (1.91 m)	210 lb (95 kg)	Fr	Palisades	Quakertown, Pennsylvania
16	OF	Bobby Whalen	R/R	6 ft 0 in (1.83 m)	175 lb (79 kg)	Fr	Cedar Cliff	Camp Hill, Pennsylvania
17	RHP	Alex Logusch	R/R	6 ft 0 in (1.83 m)	195 lb (88 kg)	Fr	De Smet	St. Louis, Missouri
18	LHP	Scott Braden	R/L	6 ft 3 in (1.91 m)	215 lb (98 kg)	Sr	Shakamak	Jasonville, Indiana
19	LHP	Tommy Sommer	L/L	6 ft 4 in (1.93 m)	220 lb (100 kg)	Jr	Carmel	Carmel, Indiana
20	INF	Brennan Rowe	R/R	6 ft 0 in (1.83 m)	200 lb (91 kg)	Fr	Olentangy Liberty	Powell, Ohio
21	INF	Jordan Fucci	L/R	6 ft 5 in (1.96 m)	225 lb (102 kg)	RS Sr	Tates Creek	Lexington, Kentucky
23	LHP	Zach Behrmann	L/L	6 ft 6 in (1.98 m)	220 lb (100 kg)	Fr	North Central	Indianapolis, Indiana
25	RHP	Connor Manous	R/R	5 ft 11 in (1.8 m)	195 lb (88 kg)	RS Jr	Munster	Munster, Indiana
26	OF	Tucker Schank	L/R	5 ft 9 in (1.75 m)	180 lb (82 kg)	Fr	Southridge	Huntingburg, Indiana
27	RHP	Reese Sharp	R/R	6 ft 3 in (1.91 m)	225 lb (102 kg)	Fr	University	Noblesville, Indiana
28	OF	Sam Murrison	R/R	5 ft 11 in (1.8 m)	165 lb (75 kg)	Fr	American Heritage	Boca Raton, Florida
29	RHP	Clark Casper	R/R	6 ft 7 in (2.01 m)	275 lb (125 kg)	Fr	Columbus North	North Vernon, Indiana
30	INF	Kip Fougerousse	R/R	6 ft 3 in (1.91 m)	230 lb (104 kg)	Fr	Linton	Linton, Indiana
31	LHP	Jack Walker	L/L	6 ft 6 in (1.98 m)	220 lb (100 kg)	Fr	New Palestine	New Palestine, Indiana
32	OF	Tyler Van Pelt	L/R	5 ft 11 in (1.8 m)	200 lb (91 kg)	So	Bloomington South	Bloomington, Indiana
33	C	Jacob Southern	R/R	6 ft 0 in (1.83 m)	200 lb (91 kg)	RS Sr	Apopka	Mount Dora, Florida
34	RHP	Braydon Tucker	L/R	6 ft 3 in (1.91 m)	210 lb (95 kg)	So	Northview	Brazil, Indiana
35	RHP	Matt Litwicki	R/R	6 ft 2 in (1.88 m)	220 lb (100 kg)	So	Lake Central	Dyer, Indiana
37	RHP	Gabe Bierman	R/R	6 ft 2 in (1.88 m)	200 lb (91 kg)	So	Jeffersonville	Jeffersonville, Indiana
38	INF	Jake Skrine	R/R	6 ft 2 in (1.88 m)	215 lb (98 kg)	So	Mead	Longmont, Colorado
39	RHP	Blayne Deaton	L/R	6 ft 6 in (1.98 m)	200 lb (91 kg)	Fr	Tates Creek	Lexington, Kentucky
40	C	Joe Reid	R/R	5 ft 11 in (1.8 m)	200 lb (91 kg)	Fr	Nixa	Ozark, Missouri
41	LHP	Ty Bothwell	L/L	5 ft 10 in (1.78 m)	190 lb (86 kg)	RS Fr	Boone Grove	Hebron, Indiana
42	RHP	Costa Sirounis	L/R	6 ft 6 in (1.98 m)	215 lb (98 kg)	Fr	Munster	Munster, Indiana
43	INF	Tyler Nelson	R/R	5 ft 10 in (1.78 m)	180 lb (82 kg)	Fr	Andrean	Crown Point, Indiana
44	INF	Ryan Fischer	R/R	6 ft 5 in (1.96 m)	215 lb (98 kg)	Fr	Lake Brantley	Longwood, Florida
45	RHP	John Modugno	R/R	6 ft 5 in (1.96 m)	205 lb (93 kg)	Fr	Don Bosco	Upper Saddle River, New Jersey
46	OF	Garrett Monous	R/R	6 ft 0 in (1.83 m)	185 lb (84 kg)	Fr	Munster	Munster, Indiana
47	RHP	Dylan Steele	R/R	6 ft 3 in (1.91 m)	205 lb (93 kg)	Fr	Bloomington North	Bloomington, Indiana
48	RHP	Brian Gaffney	R/R	5 ft 11 in (1.8 m)	225 lb (102 kg)	Fr	Center Grove	Greenwood, Indiana
49		Craig Yoho	R/R	6 ft 3 in (1.91 m)	215 lb (98 kg)	RS Fr	Fishers	Fishers, Indiana
51	RHP	McCade Brown	R/R	6 ft 6 in (1.98 m)	225 lb (102 kg)	So	Normal West	Normal, Illinois

Head coach

Jeff Mercer

Assistant coach(es)

Derek Simmons
Dan Held

Pitching coach(es)

Justin Parker

Legend

- (C) Team captain
- (S) Suspended
- (I) Ineligible
- Injured
- Current redshirt

Roster
Last update: March 17, 2021

== Schedule ==
Legend
Indiana win
Indiana loss
Postponement

2021 Indiana Hoosiers baseball game log
Regular season
March (11–3)

#	Date	Opponent	Rank	Venue	Score	Attendance	Overall record	B1G record
1	March 5	vs Rutgers		U.S. Bank Stadium • Minneapolis, Minnesota,	1–2	90	0–1	0–1
2	March 5	at Minnesota		U.S. Bank Stadium • Minneapolis, Minnesota	5–2	150	1–1	1–1
3	March 6	vs Rutgers		U.S. Bank Stadium • Minneapolis, Minnesota	4–2	50	2–1	2–1
4	March 7	vs Minnesota		U.S. Bank Stadium • Minneapolis, Minnesota	8–1	146	3–1	3–1
5	March 12	Penn State		Bart Kaufman Field • Bloomington, Indiana	Postponed		3–1	3–1
6	March 12	Penn State		Bart Kaufman Field • Bloomington, Indiana	Postponed	–	3–1	3–1
7	March 13	Penn State		Bart Kaufman Field • Bloomington, Indiana	7–2	150	4–1	4–1
8	March 13	Penn State		Bart Kaufman Field • Bloomington, Indiana	8–0	150	5–1	5–1
9	March 14	Penn State		Bart Kaufman Field • Bloomington, Indiana	6–5	150	6–1	6–1
10	March 14	Penn State		Bart Kaufman Field • Bloomington, Indiana	2–1	150	7–1	7–1
11	March 19	Purdue		Bart Kaufman Field • Bloomington, Indiana	2–1	225	8–1	8–1
12	March 20	Purdue		Bart Kaufman Field • Bloomington, Indiana	5–8	150	8–2	8–2
13	March 21	Purdue		Bart Kaufman Field • Bloomington, Indiana	9–4	150	9–2	9–2
14	March 26	at Michigan State		Drayton McLane Baseball Stadium at John H. Kobs Field • East Lansing, Michigan,	8–2	136	10–2	10–2
15	March 27	at Michigan State		Drayton McLane Baseball Stadium at John H. Kobs Field • East Lansing, Michigan	10–4	144	11–2	11–2
16	March 28	at Michigan State		Drayton McLane Baseball Stadium at John H. Kobs Field • East Lansing, Michigan	1–5	115	11–3	11–3

April (7–6)

#	Date	Opponent	Rank	Venue	Score	Attendance	Overall record	B1G record
17	April 2	at Ohio State		Bill Davis Stadium • Columbus, Ohio,	2–3	171	11–4	11–4
18	April 3	at Ohio State		Bill Davis Stadium • Columbus, Ohio	0–6	286	11–5	11–5
19	April 3	at Ohio State		Bill Davis Stadium • Columbus, Ohio	2–5	286	11–6	11–6
20	April 4	at Ohio State		Bill Davis Stadium • Columbus, Ohio	3–4	215	11–7	11–7
21	April 9	Illinois		Bart Kaufman Field • Bloomington, Indiana	6–4	150	12–7	12–7
22	April 10	Illinois		Bart Kaufman Field • Bloomington, Indiana	8–0	150	13–7	13–7
23	April 11	Illinois		Bart Kaufman Field • Bloomington, Indiana	Postponed	–	13–7	13–7
24	April 16	at Northwestern		Rocky Miller Park • Evanston, Illinois,	5–4	57	14–7	14–7
25	April 17	at Northwestern		Rocky Miller Park • Evanston, Illinois	5–8	63	14–8	14–8
26	April 18	at Northwestern		Rocky Miller Park • Evanston, Illinois	4–0	–	15–8	15–8
27	April 23	Minnesota		Bart Kaufman Field • Bloomington, Indiana	9–3	150	16–8	16–8
28	April 23	Minnesota		Bart Kaufman Field • Bloomington, Indiana	7–1	150	17–8	17–8
29	April 25	Minnesota		Bart Kaufman Field • Bloomington, Indiana	23–1	150	18–8	18–8
30	April 30	Iowa		Bart Kaufman Field • Bloomington, Indiana	5–6	150	18–9	18–9

May (7–7)

#	Date	Opponent	Rank	Venue	Score	Attendance	Overall record	B1G record
31	May 1	Iowa		Bart Kaufman Field • Bloomington, Indiana	12–6	150	19–9	19–9
32	May 2	Iowa		Bart Kaufman Field • Bloomingtonn, Indiana	12–8	150	20–9	20–9
33	May 7	at Rutgers		Bainton Field • Piscataway, New Jersey,	8–3	225	21–9	21–9
34	May 8	at Rutgers		Bainton Field • Piscataway, New Jersey	5–3	225	22–9	22–9
35	May 8	vs Nebraska		Bainton Field • Piscataway, New Jersey	6–7	150	22–10	22–10
36	May 9	vs Nebraska		Bainton Field • Piscataway, New Jersey	4–2	150	23–10	23–10
37	May 14	at Michigan		Ray Fisher Stadium • Ann Arbor, Michigan,	3–10	250	23–11	23–11
38	May 15	at Michigan		Ray Fisher Stadium • Ann Arbor, Michigan	13–8	250	24–11	24–11
39	May 16	at Michigan		Ray Fisher Stadium • Ann Arbor, Michigan	1–6	250	24–12	24–12
40	May 18	Illinois		Bart Kaufman Field • Bloomington, Indiana	2–3	150	24–13	24–13
41	May 21	Nebraska		Bart Kaufman Field • Bloomington, Indiana	5–8	150	24–14	24–14
42	May 22	Nebraska		Bart Kaufman Field • Bloomington, Indiana	1–3	150	24–15	24–15
43	May 23	Ohio State		Bart Kaufman Field • Bloomington, Indiana	1–3	150	24–16	24–16
44	May 24	Ohio State		Bart Kaufman Field • Bloomington, Indiana	2-0	150	25–16	25–16
45	May 29	at Maryland		Bob "Turtle" Smith Stadium • College Park, Maryland	3-4	250	25–17	25–17
46	May 29	at Maryland		Bob "Turtle" Smith Stadium • College Park, Maryland	2-5	250	25–18	25–18
47	May 30	at Maryland		Bob "Turtle" Smith Stadium • College Park, Maryland	7-3	500	26–18	26–18

Schedule Source
"#" represents ranking. All rankings from Collegiate Baseball on the date of the contest.
"()" represents postseason seeding in the Big 10 Tournament or NCAA Regional, respectively.

== Ranking movements ==
Ranking movements Legend: ██ Increase in ranking ██ Decrease in ranking — = Not ranked RV = Received votes
	Week																			
Poll	Pre	1	2	3	4	5	6	7	8	9	10	11	12	13	14	15	16	17	18	Final
Coaches'	—	—*	—	—	RV	RV	RV	—	—	—	—	RV	23	—	—					
Baseball America	—	—	—	—	—	—	—	—	—	—	—	23	21	—	—					
Collegiate Baseball^	39	—	—	—	30	28	27	—	—	—	—	—	—	—	—					
NCBWA†	—	—	—	—	RV	RV	RV	—	—	—	RV	29	27	—	—					
D1Baseball	—	—	—	—	—	—	—	—	—	—	—	24	21	—	—					

^ Collegiate Baseball ranked 40 teams in their preseason poll, but only ranked 30 teams weekly during the season.
† NCBWA ranks 30 teams in their preseason poll, but only ranks 25 teams weekly during the season.
* A new poll was not released for this week, so for comparison purposes, the previous week's ranking is inserted in this week's slot.

== Awards and honors ==
=== Pre-season awards / Watch list ===
Awards
Player	Award	Date awarded	Ref.

=== Regular season awards / Watch lists ===
Weekly Awards
Player	Award	Date awarded	Ref.
Tommy Sommer	Big Ten Pitcher of the Week	March 10, 2021	
McCade Brown	Big Ten Pitcher of the Week	March 16, 2021	
McCade Brown	Perfect Game / Rawlings Pitcher of the Week	March 16, 2021	
McCade Brown	D1Baseball / AstroTurf Player of the Week	March 16, 2021	
Braydon Tucker	Big Ten Pitcher of the Week	April 13, 2021	
Morgan Colopy	Big Ten Freshman of the Week	April 27, 2021	
Cole Barr	Big Ten Player of the Week	May 4, 2021	

=== Conference awards ===
Weekly Awards
Player	Award	Date awarded	Ref.
Grant Richardson	All-Big Ten First Team	May 30, 2021	
Gabe Bierman	All-Big Ten Second Team	May 30, 2021	
McCade Brown	All-Big Ten Second Team	May 30, 2021	
Cole Barr	All-Big Ten Third Team	May 30, 2021	
Paul Toetz	All-Big Ten Freshman Team	May 30, 2021	
Morgan Colopy	All-Big Ten Freshman Team	May 30, 2021	
John Modugno	All-Big Ten Freshman Team	May 30, 2021	

=== Award watch lists ===
Listed in the order that they were released

Award	Player	Position	Year	Date awarded	Ref

== 2021 MLB draft ==
The Hoosiers had six players selected in the 2021 MLB draft, most in the Big Ten.

Player	Position	Round	Overall	MLB team
McCade Brown	RHP	3	79	Colorado Rockies
Gabe Bierman	RHP	7	209	Miami Marlins
Matt Litwicki	RHP	10	286	Boston Red Sox
Tommy Sommer	LHP	10	305	Chicago White Sox
Cole Barr	3B	15	444	Seattle Mariners
Grant Richardson	OF	17	513	New York Yankees

== See also ==
- 2021 Big Ten Conference baseball tournament
- 2021 NCAA Division I baseball tournament
