= Greg Beals =

American baseball coach (born 1970)

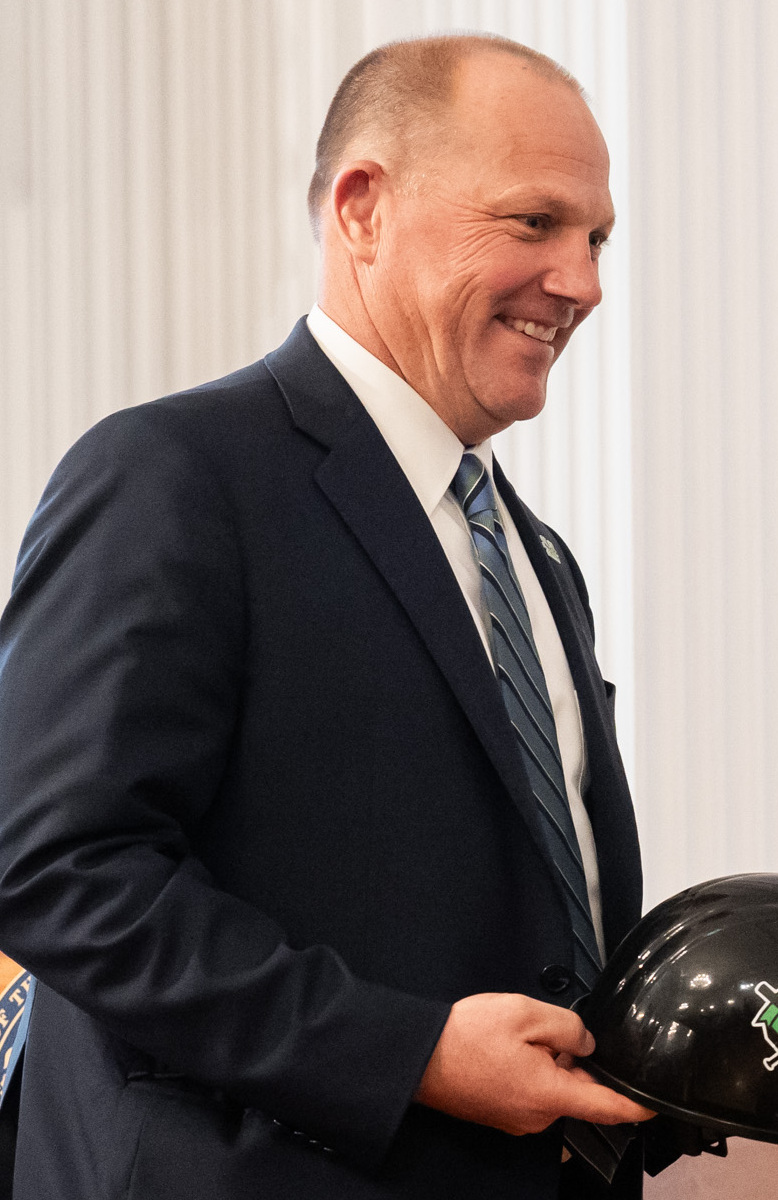
- Beals in 2024

Current position
- Title: Head coach
- Team: Marshall
- Conference: Sun Belt
- Record: 90–132

Biographical details
- Born: February 9, 1970 (age 56); Springfield, Ohio, U.S.

Playing career
- 1989–1991: Kent State
- Position: C

Coaching career (HC unless noted)
- 1994–2002: Kent State (Asst.)
- 2003–2010: Ball State
- 2011–2022: Ohio State
- 2023–present: Marshall

Head coaching record
- Overall: 678–622–1
- Tournaments: NCAA: 2–6

Accomplishments and honors

Championships
- 2× Big Ten Tournament (2016, 2019); MAC Tournament (2006)

Greg Beals (born February 9, 1970) is an American college baseball coach and former catcher, who is the current head baseball coach of the Marshall Thundering Herd. Beals played college baseball at Kent State University from 1989 to 1991 for coach Danny Hall. He previously served as head coach at Ball State (2003–2010) and the Ohio State Buckeyes (2011–2022).

== Playing career ==
Beals was a three-year letterman at catcher for Kent State, batting .306 for his career and earning honorable mention All-MAC honors. He was drafted by the New York Mets in the 21st Round of the 1991 MLB draft and played three seasons professionally, reaching high Class-A and playing on division-winning teams in each season.

== Coaching career ==
After ending his playing career, Beals became an assistant coach at Kent State, working primarily on recruiting. In nine seasons with the Golden Flashes, the team claimed a pair of MAC Tournament championships and made three NCAA Regional appearances. He would see 21 recruits sign professional contracts, 36 earn All-MAC honors, and 17 earned Academic All-MAC honors. He then earned his first head coaching job at Ball State. In eight seasons with the Cardinals, his teams claimed three MAC West Division championships and the school's first MAC Tournament title, leading to an NCAA Regional appearance. Only once did his team finish below third in the six-plus team division, also the only time the Cardinals failed to qualify for the MAC Tournament. This was after six starting position players and a top pitcher from the NCAA Tournament team, four of whom were drafted. Beals saw five players named All-Americans, 18 named All-MAC, and 15 Academic All-MAC, as well as 20 players drafted in the Major League Baseball draft.

In the summer of 2010, Beals was named head coach at Ohio State. He has led the Buckeyes to the Big Ten Tournament each of his three seasons. Beals lead the Buckeyes to their first NCAA Regional in 2016, with a Big Ten Conference Tournament championship, their first postseason appearance since 2009. Beals lead the Buckeyes to another Big Ten Conference Tournament championship in 2019. On May 23, 2022, Beals was fired by the Buckeyes after finishing 12th in the 2022 season. He posted a 346–288–1 record in 11 seasons.

On July 25, 2022, Beals was introduced as the head coach of the Akron Zips.

On January 3, 2023, Beals was introduced as the head coach of the Marshall baseball team without ever coaching a game for Akron.

== Head coaching record ==
Record table
Season	Team	Overall	Conference	Standing	Postseason
Ball State Cardinals (Mid-American Conference) (2003–2010)
2003	Ball State	36–21	17–10	1st (West)	MAC Tournament (Note: The two division winners plus the next four finishers, regardless of division, of the MAC's 13 teams qualified for the Tournament in 2003.)
2004	Ball State	28–28	14–10	T-2nd (West)	MAC Tournament (Note: The two division winners plus the next four finishers, regardless of division, of the MAC's 13 teams qualified for the Tournament in 2004.)
2005	Ball State	38–18	17–5	T-1st (West)	MAC Tournament (Note: The two division winners plus the next four finishers, regardless of division, of the MAC's 13 teams qualified for the Tournament in 2005.)
2006	Ball State	38–22	16–9	2nd (West)	NCAA Regional
2007	Ball State	20–34	8–19	6th (West)	
2008	Ball State	28–25	12–11	3rd (West)	MAC Tournament (Note: The two division winners plus the next six finishers, regardless of division, of the MAC's 12 teams qualified for the Tournament in 2008.)
2009	Ball State	26–25	14–10	1st (West)	MAC Tournament (Note: The two division winners plus the next six finishers, regardless of division, of the MAC's 12 teams qualified for the Tournament in 2009.)
2010	Ball State	29–29	19–8	3rd (West)	MAC Tournament (Note: The two division winners plus the next six finishers, regardless of division, of the MAC's 12 teams qualified for the Tournament in 2008.)
Ball State:		243–202	117–72		
Ohio State Buckeyes (Big Ten Conference) (2011–2022)
2011	Ohio State	25–27	13–11	4th	Big Ten Tournament (Note: The top six finishers of the Big Ten's ten teams qualified for the Tournament in 2011.)
2012	Ohio State	33–27	11–13	6th	Big Ten Tournament (Note: The top six finishers of the Big Ten's eleven teams qualified for the Tournament in 2012.)
2013	Ohio State	35–23	15–9	2nd	Big Ten Tournament (Note: The top six finishers of the Big Ten's eleven teams qualified for the Tournament in 2013.)
2014	Ohio State	30–28	10–14	T–7th	Big Ten Tournament (Note: The top eight finishers of the Big Ten's eleven teams qualified for the Tournament in 2014.)
2015	Ohio State	35–20	13–11	7th	Big Ten Tournament (Note: The top eight finishers of the Big Ten's thirteen teams qualified for the Tournament in 2015.)
2016	Ohio State	44–20–1	15–9	T–3rd	NCAA Regional
2017	Ohio State	22–34	8–16	9th	
2018	Ohio State	36–24	14–10	7th	NCAA Regional
2019	Ohio State	36–27	12–12	T–6th	NCAA Regional
2020	Ohio State	6–8	0–0		Season canceled due to COVID-19
2021	Ohio State	22–20	22–20	6th	
2022	Ohio State	21–30	8–14	11th	
Ohio State:		345–288–1	141–139		
Marshall Thundering Herd (Sun Belt Conference) (2023–present)
2023	Marshall	16–37	5–25	14th	
2024	Marshall	18–37	9–21	13th	
2025	Marshall	33–26	16–14	T–4th	Sun Belt tournament
2026	Marshall	23–32	13–17	10th	Sun Belt tournament
Marshall:		90–132	43–77		
Total:		678–622–1			
National champion Postseason invitational champion Conference regular season champion Conference regular season and conference tournament champion Division regular season champion Division regular season and conference tournament champion Conference tournament champion
