= 2021 Purdue Boilermakers baseball team =

American college baseball season

2021 Purdue Boilermakers baseball
- Conference: Big Ten Conference
- Record: 16–26 (16–26 Big Ten)
- Head coach: Greg Goff (2nd season)
- Assistant coach: Harry Shipley (2nd season)
- Hitting coach: Cooper Fouts (3rd season)
- Pitching coach: Chris Marx (2nd season)
- Home stadium: Alexander Field

2021 Big Ten Conference baseball standings
	Conf.				Overall
Team	W		L	PCT	W		L	PCT
No. 19 Nebraska ‍†‍‍^{y}	31	–	12	.721	34	–	14	.708
No. 24 Maryland ‍‍‍^{y}	28	–	16	.636	30	–	18	.625
Michigan ‍‍‍^{y}	27	–	17	.614	27	–	19	.587
Indiana ‍‍‍	26	–	18	.591	26	–	18	.591
Iowa ‍‍‍	26	–	18	.591	26	–	18	.591
Ohio State ‍‍‍	22	–	20	.524	22	–	20	.524
Illinois ‍‍‍	22	–	22	.500	22	–	22	.500
Rutgers ‍‍‍	21	–	23	.477	21	–	23	.477
Penn State ‍‍‍	18	–	24	.429	18	–	24	.429
Northwestern ‍‍‍	15	–	21	.417	15	–	21	.417
Michigan State ‍‍‍	17	–	27	.386	17	–	27	.386
Purdue ‍‍‍	16	–	26	.381	16	–	26	.381
Minnesota ‍‍‍	6	–	31	.162	6	–	31	.162
† – Conference champion y – Invited to the NCAA tournament As of June 7, 2021; Rankings from D1Baseball

The 2021 Purdue Boilermakers baseball team was a baseball team that represented Purdue University in the 2021 NCAA Division I baseball season. The Boilermakers were members of the Big Ten Conference and played their home games at Alexander Field in West Lafayette, Indiana. They were led by second-year head coach Greg Goff.

== Previous season ==
The Boilermakers finished the 2020 NCAA Division I baseball season 7–7 overall (0–0 conference) and eighth place in conference standings, as the season was cut short in stages by March 12 due to the COVID-19 pandemic.

== Roster ==
2021 Purdue Boilermakers baseball team
Players
Coaches

#	Pos.	Name	B/T	Height	Weight	Year	Previous school	Home town
1	OF	Mike Bolton Jr.	L/R	5 ft 9 in (1.75 m)	155 lb (70 kg)	Fr	Brother Rice H. S.	Calumet City, Illinois
2	INF	Tyler Powers	R/R	5 ft 9 in (1.75 m)	155 lb (70 kg)	Jr	Lafayette Central Catholics Jr/Sr H. S.	Lafayette, Indiana
3	OF	Tanner Haston	R/R	5 ft 11 in (1.8 m)	175 lb (79 kg)	RS Fr	Mooresville H. S.	Mooresville, Indiana
4	OF	Skyler Hunter	S/R	5 ft 10 in (1.78 m)	185 lb (84 kg)	Sr	Hood River Valley H. S.	Hood River, Oregon
5	INF	Evan Albrecht	R/R	5 ft 10 in (1.78 m)	150 lb (68 kg)	So	West Bend West H. S.	West Bend, Wisconsin
6	OF	Weston Gingerich	L/L	5 ft 10 in (1.78 m)	160 lb (73 kg)	Fr	St. Theodore Guerin H. S.	Carmel, Indiana
7	C	Zac Fascia	L/R	6 ft 1 in (1.85 m)	220 lb (100 kg)	Sr	Indian Hills Community College	Brampton, Ontario
9	INF	Ryan Howe	R/R	6 ft 2 in (1.88 m)	180 lb (82 kg)	So	Prospect H. S.	Mount Prospect, Illinois
10	INF	Justin Walker Jr.	S/R	6 ft 0 in (1.83 m)	170 lb (77 kg)	RS Jr	Jefferson H. S.	Lafayette, Indiana
13	INF	Mason Gavre	R/R	6 ft 0 in (1.83 m)	200 lb (91 kg)	Jr	Paradise Valley Community College	Tucson, Arizona
14	RHP	Cory Brooks	R/R	6 ft 1 in (1.85 m)	195 lb (88 kg)	RS So	Hillard Darby H. S.	Hilliard, Ohio
16	RHP	Nolan Daniel	R/R	6 ft 4 in (1.93 m)	225 lb (102 kg)	RS Jr	Tallahassee Community College	Dublin, Georgia
17	LHP	Jackson Smeltz	L/L	6 ft 3 in (1.91 m)	210 lb (95 kg)	RS Fr	McCutcheon H. S.	Lafayette, Indiana
18	OF	Miles Simington	L/L	5 ft 9 in (1.75 m)	220 lb (100 kg)	Jr	Heartland Community College	Bloomington, Illinois
19	OF	Pat Clohisy	L/L	5 ft 10 in (1.78 m)	190 lb (86 kg)	RS Fr	Chaminade Prep	St. Louis, Missouri
20	INF	Kyle LaPlante	R/R	6 ft 3 in (1.91 m)	185 lb (84 kg)	Jr	Niagara County Community College	Lancaster, New York
22	C	Steve Ramirez	R/R	5 ft 11 in (1.8 m)	195 lb (88 kg)	Jr	Riverside City College	San Bernardino, California
23	RHP	Jacob Mrosko	R/R	6 ft 2 in (1.88 m)	190 lb (86 kg)	Fr	Chanhassen H. S.	Chanhassen, Minnesota
25	C	Jake Stadler	L/R	6 ft 0 in (1.83 m)	190 lb (86 kg)	Fr	Mount Vernon H. S.	Greenfield, Indiana
26	RHP	Logan Danzeisen	L/R	6 ft 2 in (1.88 m)	205 lb (93 kg)	RS Fr	Sylvania Southview H. S.	Sylvania, Ohio
27	OF	Jack Firestone	L/R	6 ft 2 in (1.88 m)	195 lb (88 kg)	Fr	Zionsville Community H. S.	Zionsville, Indiana
28	LHP	James Kulak	L/L	6 ft 3 in (1.91 m)	175 lb (79 kg)	So	Neuqua Valley H. S.	Naperville, Illinois
29		Cam Thompson	R/R	6 ft 2 in (1.88 m)	200 lb (91 kg)	Fr	Owasso High School	Owasso, Oklahoma
31	C	Jeremy Schrock	L/R	6 ft 0 in (1.83 m)	200 lb (91 kg)	Fr	Rockwood Summit H. S.	Fenton, Missouri
32	RHP	Calvin Starnes	R/R	6 ft 4 in (1.93 m)	180 lb (82 kg)	Fr	Northwest Florida State College	Coloma, Michigan
33	RHP	Landon Weins	R/R	6 ft 2 in (1.88 m)	180 lb (82 kg)	Jr	Wabash Valley College	Frankton, Indiana
34	INF	Cade Hohl	R/R	5 ft 10 in (1.78 m)	180 lb (82 kg)	RS Fr	St. Louis University H. S.	Huntleigh, Missouri
35	OF	Ben Nisle	R/R	6 ft 2 in (1.88 m)	200 lb (91 kg)	Jr	Lake Central H. S.	Schererville, Indiana
36	RHP	Trent Johnson	R/R	6 ft 2 in (1.88 m)	190 lb (86 kg)	Jr	Crawfordsville H. S.	Crawfordsville, Indiana
37	LHP	Joe Whitman	L/L	6 ft 3 in (1.91 m)	185 lb (84 kg)	Fr	Hudson H. S.	Hudson, Ohio
38	RHP	Kyle Wade	R/R	6 ft 2 in (1.88 m)	225 lb (102 kg)	So	Kokomo H. S.	Kokomo, Indiana
40	LHP	Calvin Schapira	R/L	6 ft 5 in (1.96 m)	30 lb (14 kg)	Jr	Central Arizona College	Scottsdale, Arizona
41	RHP	Ricky Castro	R/R	6 ft 1 in (1.85 m)	195 lb (88 kg)	RS So	Parkland College	Naperville, Illinois
42	RHP	Will Tenuta	R/R	6 ft 2 in (1.88 m)	190 lb (86 kg)	Fr	Sandburg H. S.	Orland Park, Illinois
43	RHP	Avery Cook	R/R	6 ft 6 in (1.98 m)	235 lb (107 kg)	Fr	Whitesboro H. S.	Utica, New York
44	INF	Jake Parr	R/R	6 ft 7 in (2.01 m)	210 lb (95 kg)	Fr	Buckhorn H. S.	New Market, Alabama
45	RHP	Jett Jackson	R/R	6 ft 4 in (1.93 m)	180 lb (82 kg)	Fr	Dickson County H. S.	Burns, Tennessee
46	RHP	Nick Alvarado	R/R	6 ft 7 in (2.01 m)	250 lb (113 kg)	RS Sr	Grain Valley H. S.	Grain Valley, Missouri
47	RHP	Eric Hildebrand	R/R	6 ft 0 in (1.83 m)	170 lb (77 kg)	So	Anchor Bay H. S.	Chesterfield, Michigan
48	RHP	Griffin Lohman	L/R	6 ft 5 in (1.96 m)	190 lb (86 kg)	Fr	Hamilton Southeastern H. S.	Fishers, Indiana

Head coach

39 Greg Goff

Assistant coach(es)

Hitting coach(es)

11 Cooper Fouts

Base coach(es)

1 Harry Shipley

Pitching coach(es)

21 Chris Marx

Legend

- (C) Team captain
- (S) Suspended
- (I) Ineligible
- Injured
- Current redshirt

Roster
Last update: January 30, 2021

== Schedule ==
2021 Purdue Boilermakers baseball game log
Regular season
March (3–11)

#	Date	Opponent	Site/stadium	Score	Win	Loss	Save	Attendance	Overall record	B1G record
1	March 5	vs Nebraska	Dell Diamond • Round Rock, Texas	6–5	Smeltz (1–0)	Schreiber (0–1)	None	225	1–0	1–0
2	March 6	vs Nebraska	Dell Diamond • Round Rock, Texas	2–7	Hroch (1–0)	Schapira (0–1)	None	225	1–1	1–1
3	March 6	vs Nebraska	Dell Diamond • Round Rock, Texas	0–10	Schanaman (1–0)	Alvarado (0–1)	None	225	1–2	1–2
4	March 7	vs Nebraska	Dell Diamond • Round Rock, Texas	0–4	Schreiber (1–1)	Jackson (0–1)	None	225	1–3	1–3
5	March 12	vs Michigan	Fluor Field at the West End • Greenville, South Carolina	1–9	Hajjar (1–0)	Johnson (0–1)	None	225	1–4	1–4
6	March 13	vs Michigan	Fluor Field at the West End • Greenville, South Carolina	0–4	Weston (1–1)	Schapira (0–2)	None	225	1–5	1–5
7	March 13	vs Michigan	Fluor Field at the West End • Greenville, South Carolina	2–9	Dragani (2–0)	Starnes (0–1)	None	225	1–6	1–6
8	March 14	vs Michigan	Fluor Field at the West End • Greenville, South Carolina	6–11	Pace (1–0)	Daniel (0–1)	None	225	1–7	1–7
9	March 19	at Indiana	Bart Kaufman Field • Bloomington, Indiana	1–2	Stahl (1–0)	Brooks (0–1)	Litwicki (3)	225	1–8	1–8
10	March 20	at Indiana	Bart Kaufman Field • Bloomington, Indiana	8–5	Hildebrand (1–0)	Brown (2–1)	Daniel (1)	150	2–8	2–8
11	March 21	at Indiana	Bart Kaufman Field • Bloomington, Indiana	4–9	Bierman (1–1)	Jackson (0–2)	None	150	2–9	2–9
12	March 26	Rutgers	Alexander Field • West Lafayette, Indiana	5–7	Rutkowski (2–1)	Johnson (0–2)	None	433	2–10	2–10
13	March 27	Rutgers	Alexander Field • West Lafayette, Indiana	7–4	Smeltz (2–0)	Fitzpatrick (0–1)	None	505	3–10	3–10
14	March 28	Rutgers	Alexander Field • West Lafayette, Indiana	4–15	Teller (1–2)	Jackson (0–3)	None	474	3–11	3–11

April (7–8)

#	Date	Opponent	Site/stadium	Score	Win	Loss	Save	Attendance	Overall record	B1G record
15	April 2	Iowa	Alexander Field • West Lafayette, Indiana	2–4	Nedved (2–0)	Weins (0–1)	None	479	3–12	3–12
16	April 3	Iowa	Alexander Field • West Lafayette, Indiana	10–8	Brooks (1–1)	Guzek (0–1)	Cook (1)	496	4–12	4–12
17	April 4	Iowa	Alexander Field • West Lafayette, Indiana	5–8	Davitt (3–1)	Kulak (0–1)	None	534	4–13	4–13
18	April 10	vs Penn State	Drayton McLane Baseball Stadium at John H. Kobs Field • East Lansing, Michigan	0–11	Virbitsky (1–2)	Schapira (0–3)	None	208	4–14	4–14
19	April 11	vs Penn State	Drayton McLane Baseball Stadium at John H. Kobs Field • East Lansing, Michigan	8–5	Johnson (1–2)	Henline (0–1)	Alvarado (1)	236	5–14	5–14
20	April 11	at Michigan State	Drayton McLane Baseball Stadium at John H. Kobs Field • East Lansing, Michigan	2–5	Powers (2–1)	Smeltz (2–1)	Iverson (6)	217	5–15	5–15
21	April 12	at Michigan State	Drayton McLane Baseball Stadium at John H. Kobs Field • East Lansing, Michigan	8–2	Brooks (2–1)	Heikkinen (0–1)	None	201	6–15	6–15
22	April 17	vs Michigan State	Illinois Field • Champaign, Illinois	2–1	Smeltz (3–1)	Iverson (0–2)	None	155	7–15	7–15
23	April 18	vs Michigan State	Illinois Field • Champaign, Illinois	8–3	Johnson (2–2)	Heikkinen (0–2)	None	166	8–15	8–15
24	April 18	at Illinois	Illinois Field • Champaign, Illinois	6–4	Daniel (1–1)	Kutt (0–4)	Cook (2)	238	9–15	9–15
25	April 19	at Illinois	Illinois Field • Champaign, Illinois	20–6	Castro (1–0)	Maldonado (0–2)	None	151	10–15	10–15
26	April 23	Illinois	Alexander Field • West Lafayette, Indiana	5–6	Hoffmann (1–0)	Schapira (0–4)	Kutt (1)	520	10–16	10–16
27	April 24	Illinois	Alexander Field • West Lafayette, Indiana	4–12	Lavender (5–0)	Johnson (2–3)	Rybarczyk (2)	537	10–17	10–17
28	April 25	Illinois	Alexander Field • West Lafayette, Indiana	0–3	O'Hara (2–0)	Hildebrand (1–1)	Kirschsieper (1)	532	10–18	10–18
29	April 30	at Ohio State	Bill Davis Stadium • Columbus, Ohio	3–11	Burhenn (3–3)	Schapira (0–5)	None	205	10–19	10–19

May (6–7)

#	Date	Opponent	Site/stadium	Score	Win	Loss	Save	Attendance	Overall record	B1G record
30	May 1	at Ohio State	Bill Davis Stadium • Columbus, Ohio	2–12	Lonsway (3–4)	Johnson (2–4)	None	305	10–20	10–20
31	May 2	at Ohio State	Bill Davis Stadium • Columbus, Ohio	16–15	Hildebrand (2–1)	Murphy (4–4)	Smeltz (1)	296	11–20	11–20
–	May 7	Northwestern	Alexander Field • West Lafayette, Indiana	Cancelled due to COVID-19 protocols						
–	May 8	Northwestern	Alexander Field • West Lafayette, Indiana	Cancelled due to COVID-19 protocols						
–	May 9	Northwestern	Alexander Field • West Lafayette, Indiana	Cancelled due to COVID-19 protocols						
32	May 11	Ohio State	Alexander Field • West Lafayette, Indiana	1–5	Burhenn (5–2)	Brooks (2–2)	None	400	11–21	11–21
33	May 14	at Maryland	Bob "Turtle" Smith Stadium • College Park, Maryland	0–11	Dean (3–1)	Schapira (0–6)	None	150	11–22	11–22
34	May 15	at Maryland	Bob "Turtle" Smith Stadium • College Park, Maryland	1–6	Savacool (7–1)	Johnson (2–5)	Ramsey (2)	250	11–23	11–23
35	May 16	at Maryland	Bob "Turtle" Smith Stadium • College Park, Maryland	2–7	Burke (3–3)	Brooks (2–3)	Zoellner (1)	250	11–24	11–24
38	May 20	at Minnesota	Siebert Field • Minneapolis, Minnesota	9–3	Schapira (1–6)	DeLuga (0–2)	None	225	12–24	12–24
39	May 21	at Minnesota	Siebert Field • Minneapolis, Minnesota	12–5	Johnson (3–5)	Burchill (1–1)	None	225	13–24	13–24
40	May 22	at Minnesota	Siebert Field • Minneapolis, Minnesota	17–4	Brooks (3–3)	Liffrig (1–4)	None	225	14–24	14–24
41	May 23	at Minnesota	Siebert Field • Minneapolis, Minnesota	8–9	Duffy (1–4)	Weins (0–2)	None	225	14–25	14–25
42	May 27	Penn State	Alexander Field • West Lafayette, Indiana	7–4	Johnson (4–5)	Larkin (3–7)	Smeltz (2)	607	15–25	15–25
–	May 28	Penn State	Alexander Field • West Lafayette, Indiana	Cancelled due to weather						
43	May 30	Minnesota	Alexander Field • West Lafayette, Indiana	1–2	Liffrig (2–4)	Brooks (3–4)	Davis (1)	622	15–26	15–26
44	May 30	Minnesota	Alexander Field • West Lafayette, Indiana	7–6	Schapira (2–6)	Duffy (1–5)	None	622	16–26	16–26

=== Conference awards ===
Awards
Player	Award	Date Awarded	Ref.
Ben Nisle	Third team All-Big Ten	May 30, 2021	
Miles Simington	Third team All-Big Ten	May 30, 2021	
Mike Bolton	Third team All-Big Ten	May 30, 2021	
