= 2021 Nebraska Cornhuskers baseball team =

Baseball team season

2021 Nebraska Cornhuskers baseball

Big Ten champions

Fayetteville Regional
- Conference: Big Ten Conference

Ranking
- Coaches: No. 19
- CB: No. 18
- Record: 34–14 (31–12 Big Ten)
- Head coach: Will Bolt (2nd season)
- Assistant coach: Lance Harvell (2nd season)
- Hitting coach: Jeff Christy (2nd season)
- Pitching coach: Danny Marcuzzo (2nd season)
- Home stadium: Haymarket Park

2021 Big Ten Conference baseball standings
| | Conf. | | | | Overall |
| Team | W | | L | PCT | W | | L | PCT |
|---|---|---|---|---|---|---|---|---|
| No. 19 Nebraska ‍†‍‍^{y} | 31 | – | 12 | .721 | 34 | – | 14 | .708 |
| No. 24 Maryland ‍‍‍^{y} | 28 | – | 16 | .636 | 30 | – | 18 | .625 |
| Michigan ‍‍‍^{y} | 27 | – | 17 | .614 | 27 | – | 19 | .587 |
| Indiana ‍‍‍ | 26 | – | 18 | .591 | 26 | – | 18 | .591 |
| Iowa ‍‍‍ | 26 | – | 18 | .591 | 26 | – | 18 | .591 |
| Ohio State ‍‍‍ | 22 | – | 20 | .524 | 22 | – | 20 | .524 |
| Illinois ‍‍‍ | 22 | – | 22 | .500 | 22 | – | 22 | .500 |
| Rutgers ‍‍‍ | 21 | – | 23 | .477 | 21 | – | 23 | .477 |
| Penn State ‍‍‍ | 18 | – | 24 | .429 | 18 | – | 24 | .429 |
| Northwestern ‍‍‍ | 15 | – | 21 | .417 | 15 | – | 21 | .417 |
| Michigan State ‍‍‍ | 17 | – | 27 | .386 | 17 | – | 27 | .386 |
| Purdue ‍‍‍ | 16 | – | 26 | .381 | 16 | – | 26 | .381 |
| Minnesota ‍‍‍ | 6 | – | 31 | .162 | 6 | – | 31 | .162 |
† – Conference champion y – Invited to the NCAA tournament As of June 7, 2021; Rankings from D1Baseball

The 2021 Nebraska Cornhuskers baseball team represented the University of Nebraska–Lincoln in the 2021 NCAA Division I baseball season. The Cornhuskers, led by head coach Will Bolt in his second season, were a member of the Big Ten Conference and played their home games at Haymarket Park in Lincoln, Nebraska.

== Awards ==
=== Big Ten Conference Players of the Week ===
Weekly Awards
| Player | Award | Date Awarded | Ref. |
|---|---|---|---|
| Cam Chick | Player of the Week | March 23, 2021 | |
| Cade Povich | Pitcher of the Week | March 30, 2021 | |
| Cade Povich | Pitcher of the Week | May 18, 2021 | |
| Max Anderson | Freshman of the Week | May 18, 2021 | |
| Chance Hroch | Pitcher of the Week | May 25, 2021 | |
| Cade Povich | Pitcher of the Week | June 1, 2021 | |

=== Conference awards ===
Awards
| Player | Award | Date Awarded | Ref. |
|---|---|---|---|
| Spencer Schwellenbach | Big Ten Player of the Year | May 30, 2021 | |
| Max Anderson | Big Ten Freshman of the Year | May 30, 2021 | |
| Luke Roskam | First Team All-Big Ten | May 30, 2021 | |
| Jaxon Hallmark | First Team All-Big Ten | May 30, 2021 | |
| Cade Povich | First Team All-Big Ten | May 30, 2021 | |
| Spencer Schwellenbach | First Team All-Big Ten | May 30, 2021 | |
| Max Anderson | Second Team All-Big Ten | May 30, 2021 | |
| Max Anderson | Freshman Team All-Big Ten | May 30, 2021 | |
| Brice Matthews | Freshman Team All-Big Ten | May 30, 2021 | |

== 2021 MLB draft ==
| Player | Position | Round | Overall | MLB team |
|---|---|---|---|---|
| Spencer Schwellenbach | RHP / SS | 2 | 59 | Atlanta Braves |
| Cade Povich | LHP | 3 | 98 | Minnesota Twins |
