= 2021 Ohio State Buckeyes baseball team =

American college baseball season

2021 Ohio State Buckeyes baseball
- Conference: Big Ten Conference
- Record: 22–20 (22–20 Big Ten)
- Head coach: Greg Beals (11th season)
- Assistant coach: Brad Goldberg (2nd season)
- Hitting coach: Matt Angle (3rd season)
- Pitching coach: Dan DeLucia (2nd season)
- Home stadium: Bill Davis Stadium

2021 Big Ten Conference baseball standings
| | Conf. | | | | Overall |
| Team | W | | L | PCT | W | | L | PCT |
|---|---|---|---|---|---|---|---|---|
| No. 19 Nebraska ‍†‍‍^{y} | 31 | – | 12 | .721 | 34 | – | 14 | .708 |
| No. 24 Maryland ‍‍‍^{y} | 28 | – | 16 | .636 | 30 | – | 18 | .625 |
| Michigan ‍‍‍^{y} | 27 | – | 17 | .614 | 27 | – | 19 | .587 |
| Indiana ‍‍‍ | 26 | – | 18 | .591 | 26 | – | 18 | .591 |
| Iowa ‍‍‍ | 26 | – | 18 | .591 | 26 | – | 18 | .591 |
| Ohio State ‍‍‍ | 22 | – | 20 | .524 | 22 | – | 20 | .524 |
| Illinois ‍‍‍ | 22 | – | 22 | .500 | 22 | – | 22 | .500 |
| Rutgers ‍‍‍ | 21 | – | 23 | .477 | 21 | – | 23 | .477 |
| Penn State ‍‍‍ | 18 | – | 24 | .429 | 18 | – | 24 | .429 |
| Northwestern ‍‍‍ | 15 | – | 21 | .417 | 15 | – | 21 | .417 |
| Michigan State ‍‍‍ | 17 | – | 27 | .386 | 17 | – | 27 | .386 |
| Purdue ‍‍‍ | 16 | – | 26 | .381 | 16 | – | 26 | .381 |
| Minnesota ‍‍‍ | 6 | – | 31 | .162 | 6 | – | 31 | .162 |
† – Conference champion y – Invited to the NCAA tournament As of June 7, 2021; Rankings from D1Baseball

The 2021 Ohio State Buckeyes baseball team was a baseball team that represented Ohio State University in the 2021 NCAA Division I baseball season. The Buckeyes were members of the Big Ten Conference and played their home games at Bill Davis Stadium in Columbus, Ohio. They were led by eleventh-year head coach Greg Beals.

== Previous season ==
The Buckeyes finished the 2020 NCAA Division I baseball season 6–8 overall (0–0 conference) and twelfth place in conference standings, as the season was cut short in stages by March 12 due to the COVID-19 pandemic.

== Preseason ==
For the 2021 Big Ten Conference poll, Ohio State was voted to finish in third by the Big Ten Coaches.

== Roster ==
2021 Ohio State Buckeyes baseball team
Players
Coaches

| # | Pos. | Name | B/T | Height | Weight | Year | Previous school | Home town |
|---|---|---|---|---|---|---|---|---|
| 1 | OF | Joey Aden | R/R | 6 ft 1 in (1.85 m) | 195 lb (88 kg) | RS Fr | Bentonville West H. S. | Bentonville, Arkansas |
| 3 | RHP | Jake Vance | R/R | 6 ft 3 in (1.91 m) | 195 lb (88 kg) | RS Sr | Central Catholic H. S. | Canton, Ohio |
| 4 | INF | Zach Dezenzo | R/R | 6 ft 4 in (1.93 m) | 205 lb (93 kg) | Jr | Marlington H. S. | Alliance, Ohio |
| 5 | INF | Nick Erwin | R/R | 6 ft 0 in (1.83 m) | 175 lb (79 kg) | Jr | Grove City H. S. | Grove City, Ohio |
| 6 | RHP | Bayden Root | R/R | 6 ft 3 in (1.91 m) | 215 lb (98 kg) | Jr | Kokomo H. S. | Kokomo, Indiana |
| 7 | RHP | Garrett Burhenn | R/R | 6 ft 3 in (1.91 m) | 215 lb (98 kg) | Jr | Lawrence North H. S. | Indianapolis, Indiana |
| 8 | INF | Colton Bauer | R/R | 6 ft 1 in (1.85 m) | 200 lb (91 kg) | Sr | Grove City H. S. | Grove City, Ohio |
| 10 | RHP | Jack Neely | R/R | 6 ft 8 in (2.03 m) | 225 lb (102 kg) | Jr | Winston Churchill H. S. | San Antonio, Texas |
| 11 | LHP | Seth Lonsway | L/L | 6 ft 3 in (1.91 m) | 195 lb (88 kg) | RS Jr | Celina H. S. | Celina, Texas |
| 12 | C | Brent Todys | R/R | 5 ft 10 in (1.78 m) | 180 lb (82 kg) | RS Sr | Andrew College | Westerville, Ohio |
| 14 | INF | Nate Karaffa | R/R | 6 ft 0 in (1.83 m) | 175 lb (79 kg) | So | Toronto Junior/Senior H. S. | Toronto, Ohio |
| 15 | RHP | Tyler Kean | R/R | 6 ft 2 in (1.88 m) | 195 lb (88 kg) | So | Springboro H. S. | Springboro, Ohio |
| 16 | RHP | Wyatt Loncar | R/R | 6 ft 5 in (1.96 m) | 215 lb (98 kg) | So | Palisades Charter H. S. | Pacific Palisades, California |
| 17 | RHP | T. J. Brock | R/R | 6 ft 1 in (1.85 m) | 180 lb (82 kg) | Jr | Cincinnati Country Day School | Cincinnati, Ohio |
| 20 | OF | Nolan Clegg | R/R | 6 ft 3 in (1.91 m) | 195 lb (88 kg) | So | Toronto Junior/Senior H. S. | Toronto, Ohio |
| 21 | UTL | Caden Kaiser | L/L | 6 ft 2 in (1.88 m) | 185 lb (84 kg) | RS Fr | Olentangy H. S. | Lewis Center, Ohio |
| 24 | OF | Mitchell Okuley | L/R | 6 ft 1 in (1.85 m) | 185 lb (84 kg) | So | Olentangy Liberty H. S. | Powell, Ohio |
| 25 | OF | Brady Emerson | L/L | 5 ft 10 in (1.78 m) | 165 lb (75 kg) | Fr | John Glenn H. S. | Cambridge, Ohio |
| 26 | RHP | Nate Haberthier | R/R | 6 ft 5 in (1.96 m) | 225 lb (102 kg) | Fr | Lakota East H. S. | West Chester Township, Ohio |
| 28 | INF | Marcus Ernst | L/R | 6 ft 1 in (1.85 m) | 195 lb (88 kg) | Jr | Dublin Coffman H. S. | Dublin, Ohio |
| 29 | RHP | Archer Brookman | R/R | 6 ft 1 in (1.85 m) | 195 lb (88 kg) | Sr | John Rennie H. S. | Pointe-Claire, Quebec |
| 31 | RHP | Will Pfennig | R/R | 6 ft 0 in (1.83 m) | 170 lb (77 kg) | Jr | William Mason H. S. | Mason, Ohio |
| 32 | UTL | Aaron Hughes | R/R | 6 ft 1 in (1.85 m) | 195 lb (88 kg) | RS Jr | Tippecanoe H. S. | Tipp City, Ohio |
| 33 | UTL | Sam Wilson | R/R | 6 ft 2 in (1.88 m) | 190 lb (86 kg) | Sr | Dublin Jerome H. S. | Dublin, Ohio |
| 34 | LHP | Isaiah Coupet | L/L | 6 ft 0 in (1.83 m) | 165 lb (75 kg) | Fr | Homewood-Flossmoor H. S. | Flossmoor, Illinois |
| 36 | LHP | Mitch Milheim | L/L | 5 ft 11 in (1.8 m) | 190 lb (86 kg) | Jr | Olentangy Liberty H. S. | Powell, Ohio |
| 37 | LHP | Griffan Smith | L/L | 6 ft 2 in (1.88 m) | 215 lb (98 kg) | Sr | Cincinnati Hills Christian Academy | Cincinnati, Ohio |
| 38 | LHP | Patrick Murphy | L/L | 6 ft 1 in (1.85 m) | 205 lb (93 kg) | RS Sr | Central Catholic H. S. | Canton, Ohio |
| 39 | INF | Conner Pohl | L/R | 6 ft 5 in (1.96 m) | 235 lb (107 kg) | RS Sr | Arcanum H. S. | Arcanum, Ohio |
| 40 | UTL | Andrew Clelland | R/R | 6 ft 6 in (1.98 m) | 190 lb (86 kg) | Fr | Harrison Central H. S. | Cadiz, Ohio |
| 41 | UTL | Scottie Seymour | R/R | 5 ft 11 in (1.8 m) | 205 lb (93 kg) | RS Sr | Springfield H. S. | Maumee, Ohio |
| 42 | RHP | Joe Gahm | R/R | 6 ft 1 in (1.85 m) | 220 lb (100 kg) | RS Sr | Chattahoochee Valley C. C. | Richfield, Wisconsin |
| 43 | C | Evan Ulrich | R/R | 5 ft 11 in (1.8 m) | 170 lb (77 kg) | Fr | Buckeye Valley H. S. | Delaware, Ohio |
| 44 | OF | Casey Maniglia | R/R | 6 ft 2 in (1.88 m) | 215 lb (98 kg) | RS So | Solon H. S. | Solon, Ohio |
| 45 | RHP | Yianni Skeriotis | R/R | 6 ft 4 in (1.93 m) | 195 lb (88 kg) | RS Fr | Jackson H. S. | Massillon, Ohio |
| 46 | OF | Kade Kern | R/R | 6 ft 0 in (1.83 m) | 195 lb (88 kg) | Fr | Archbold H. S. | Archbold, Ohio |
| 47 | INF | Jake Mills | R/R | 5 ft 11 in (1.8 m) | 160 lb (73 kg) | Fr | Oxbridge Academy Foundation, Inc. | West Palm Beach, Florida |
| 48 | UTL | Trent Jones | L/R | 6 ft 3 in (1.91 m) | 190 lb (86 kg) | Fr | Jackson H. S. | Massillon, Ohio |
| 49 | RHP | Tim Baird | R/R | 6 ft 2 in (1.88 m) | 190 lb (86 kg) | Fr | North Royalton H. S. | North Royalton, Ohio |
| 50 | RHP | Ethan Hammerberg | L/R | 6 ft 5 in (1.96 m) | 210 lb (95 kg) | So | Upper Arlington H. S. | Upper Arlington, Ohio |
| 52 | LHP | Caden Kline | L/L | 6 ft 4 in (1.93 m) | 190 lb (86 kg) | Fr | Defiance H. S. | Defiance, Ohio |
| 53 | LHP | Garrett Peters | R/L | 5 ft 11 in (1.8 m) | 185 lb (84 kg) | Fr | Northeastern H. S. | Springfield, Ohio |
| 54 | INF | Blayne Robinson | L/L | 6 ft 4 in (1.93 m) | 215 lb (98 kg) | So | Defiance H. S. | Defiance, Ohio |

Head coach

9 Greg Beals

Assistant coach(es)

Brad Goldberg

Hitting coach(es)

Matt Angle

Pitching coach(es)

Dan DeLucia

Legend

- (C) Team captain
- (S) Suspended
- (I) Ineligible
- Injured
- Current redshirt

Roster
Last update: March 4, 2021

== Schedule ==
2021 Ohio State Buckeyes baseball game log
Regular season
March (8–7)

| # | Date | Opponent | Site/stadium | Score | Win | Loss | Save | Attendance | Overall record | B1G record |
|---|---|---|---|---|---|---|---|---|---|---|
| 1 | March 5 | vs Illinois | Fluor Field at the West End • Greenville, South Carolina | 6–3 | Root (1–0) | Glassey (0–1) | None | 306 | 1–0 | 1–0 |
| 2 | March 6 | vs Illinois | Fluor Field at the West End • Greenville, South Carolina | 6–5 | Kean (1–0) | Maldonado (0–1) | Root (1) | – | 2–0 | 2–0 |
| 3 | March 6 | vs Illinois | Fluor Field at the West End • Greenville, South Carolina | 12–3 | Neely (1–0) | Rybarczyk (0–1) | Coupet (1) | 417 | 3–0 | 3–0 |
| 4 | March 7 | vs Illinois | Fluor Field at the West End • Greenville, South Carolina | 0–8 | Kirschsieper (1–0) | Pfennig (0–1) | None | 215 | 3–1 | 3–1 |
| 5 | March 12 | vs Nebraska | U.S. Bank Stadium • Minneapolis, Minnesota | 0–4 | Wallace (1–0) | Lonsway (0–1) | Nedved (1) | 250 | 3–2 | 3–2 |
| 6 | March 12 | vs Iowa | U.S. Bank Stadium • Minneapolis, Minnesota | 4–10 | Povich (1–0) | Burhenn (0–1) | None | 250 | 3–3 | 3–3 |
| 7 | March 13 | vs Iowa | U.S. Bank Stadium • Minneapolis, Minnesota | 7–4 | Murphy (1–0) | Baumann (0–2) | Brock (1) | 50 | 4–3 | 4–3 |
| 8 | March 14 | vs Nebraska | U.S. Bank Stadium • Minneapolis, Minnesota | 6–4 | Root (2–0) | Bragg (0–1) | Brock (2) | 250 | 5–3 | 5–3 |
| 9 | March 20 | at Rutgers | Bainton Field • Piscataway, New Jersey | 5–6 | Muller (1–0) | Root (2–1) | None | – | 5–4 | 5–4 |
| 10 | March 21 | at Rutgers | Bainton Field • Piscataway, New Jersey | 0–2 | Wereski (3–0) | Lonsway (0–2) | Stanavich (1) | – | 5–5 | 5–5 |
| 11 | March 22 | at Rutgers | Bainton Field • Piscataway, New Jersey | 4–1 | Murphy (2–0) | Teller (0–2) | Brock (3) | – | 6–5 | 6–5 |
| 12 | March 26 | Iowa | Bill Davis Stadium • Columbus, Ohio | 8–2 | Burhenn (1–1) | Wallace (2–1) | None | 205 | 7–5 | 7–5 |
| 13 | March 27 | Iowa | Bill Davis Stadium • Columbus, Ohio | 1–5 | Baumann (1–2) | Lonsway (0–3) | Nedved (3) | – | 7–6 | 7–6 |
| 14 | March 28 | Maryland | Bill Davis Stadium • Columbus, Ohio | 5–4 | Root (3–1) | Fisher (0–3) | Brock (4) | 180 | 8–6 | 8–6 |
| 15 | March 29 | Maryland | Bill Davis Stadium • Columbus, Ohio | 3–9 | Savacool (4–0) | Pfenning (2–2) | Ramsey (1) | 107 | 8–7 | 8–7 |

April (8–6)

| # | Date | Opponent | Site/stadium | Score | Win | Loss | Save | Attendance | Overall record | B1G record |
|---|---|---|---|---|---|---|---|---|---|---|
| 16 | April 2 | Indiana | Bill Davis Stadium • Columbus, Ohio | 3–2 | Burhenn (2–1) | Sommer (3–1) | Brock (5) | 171 | 9–7 | 9–7 |
| 17 | April 3 | Indiana | Bill Davis Stadium • Columbus, Ohio | 6–0 | Lonsway (1–3) | Brown (3–2) | None | 286 | 10–7 | 10–7 |
| 18 | April 3 | Indiana | Bill Davis Stadium • Columbus, Ohio | 5–2 | Smith (1–0) | Bothwell (1–1) | Brock (6) | 286 | 11–7 | 11–7 |
| 19 | April 4 | Indiana | Bill Davis Stadium • Columbus, Ohio | 4–3 | Murphy (3–0) | Modugno (1–1) | None | 215 | 12–7 | 12–7 |
| 20 | April 9 | at No. 25 Michigan | Ray Fisher Stadium • Ann Arbor, Michigan | 7–4 | Gahm (1–0) | Pace (2–1) | Brock (7) | 250 | 13–7 | 13–7 |
| 21 | April 10 | at No. 25 Michigan | Ray Fisher Stadium • Ann Arbor, Michigan | 0–7 | Weston (4–1) | Lonsway (1–4) | None | 250 | 13–8 | 13–8 |
| 22 | April 11 | at No. 25 Michigan | Ray Fisher Stadium • Ann Arbor, Michigan | 7–16 | Denner (2–0) | Neely (1–1) | None | 250 | 13–9 | 13–9 |
| 23 | April 16 | at Maryland | Bob "Turtle" Smith Stadium • College Park, Maryland | 6–10 | Burke (2–2) | Burhenn (2–2) | None | 100 | 13–10 | 13–10 |
| 24 | April 17 | at Maryland | Bob "Turtle" Smith Stadium • College Park, Maryland | 4–5 | Falco (2–1) | Brock (0–1) | None | 100 | 13–11 | 13–11 |
| 25 | April 18 | at Maryland | Bob "Turtle" Smith Stadium • College Park, Maryland | 4–9 | Savacool (5–1) | Neely (1–2) | None | 100 | 13–12 | 13–12 |
| 26 | April 23 | Penn State | Bill Davis Stadium • Columbus, Ohio | 11–6 | Burhenn (3–2) | Shingle (1–2) | None | 282 | 14–12 | 14–12 |
| 27 | April 24 | Penn State | Bill Davis Stadium • Columbus, Ohio | 7–0 | Lonsway (2–4) | Larkin (2–5) | None | 237 | 15–12 | 15–12 |
| 28 | April 25 | Penn State | Bill Davis Stadium • Columbus, Ohio | 6–10 | Mellott (5–5) | Coupet (2–3) | None | 324 | 15–13 | 15–13 |
| 29 | April 30 | Purdue | Bill Davis Stadium • Columbus, Ohio | 11–3 | Burhenn (3–3) | Schapira (0–5) | None | 205 | 16–13 | 16–13 |

May (6–7)

| # | Date | Opponent | Site/stadium | Score | Win | Loss | Save | Attendance | Overall record | B1G record |
|---|---|---|---|---|---|---|---|---|---|---|
| 30 | May 1 | Purdue | Bill Davis Stadium • Columbus, Ohio | 12–2 | Lonsway (3–4) | Johnson (2–4) | None | 305 | 17–13 | 17–13 |
| 31 | May 2 | Purdue | Bill Davis Stadium • Columbus, Ohio | 15–16 | Hildebrand (2–1) | Murphy (4–4) | Smeltz (1) | 296 | 17–14 | 17–14 |
| – | May 7 | at Minnesota | Siebert Field • Minneapolis, Minnesota | Cancelled due to COVID-19 protocols | | | | | | |
| – | May 8 | at Minnesota | Siebert Field • Minneapolis, Minnesota | Cancelled due to COVID-19 protocols | | | | | | |
| – | May 9 | at Minnesota | Siebert Field • Minneapolis, Minnesota | Cancelled due to COVID-19 protocols | | | | | | |
| 32 | May 15 | at Purdue | Alexander Field • West Lafayette, Indiana | 5–1 | Burhenn (5–2) | Brooks (2–2) | None | 400 | 18–14 | 18–14 |
| 33 | May 14 | Michigan State | Bill Davis Stadium • Columbus, Ohio | 7–10 | Erla (4–5) | Lonsway (4–5) | Christophers (1) | 267 | 18–15 | 18–15 |
| 34 | May 15 | Michigan State | Bill Davis Stadium • Columbus, Ohio | 0–2 | Jones (2–0) | Coupet (0–2) | Benschoter (1) | – | 18–16 | 18–16 |
| 35 | May 16 | Michigan State | Bill Davis Stadium • Columbus, Ohio | 7–3 | Neely (2–2) | Benschoter (3–4) | None | 295 | 19–16 | 19–16 |
| 36 | May 22 | vs Nebraska | Bart Kaufman Field • Bloomington, Indiana | 9–11 | Olson (1–0) | Neely (2–3) | Schwellenbach (7) | 150 | 19–17 | 19–17 |
| 37 | May 23 | vs Nebraska | Bart Kaufman Field • Bloomington, Indiana | 0–9 | Perry (1–0) | Pfennig (0–3) | None | 150 | 19–18 | 19–18 |
| 38 | May 23 | at Indiana | Bart Kaufman Field • Bloomington, Indiana | 3–1 | Burhenn (3–1) | Bierman (5–4) | None | 150 | 20–18 | 20–18 |
| 39 | May 24 | at Indiana | Bart Kaufman Field • Bloomington, Indiana | 0–2 | Modugno (3–1) | Coupet (0–3) | Macciocchi (1) | 150 | 20–19 | 20–19 |
| 40 | May 28 | Northwestern | Bill Davis Stadium • Columbus, Ohio | 13–10 | Pfennig (3–1) | Pate (1–1) | Brock (8) | 183 | 21–19 | 21–19 |
| 41 | May 29 | Northwestern | Bill Davis Stadium • Columbus, Ohio | 4–1 | Burhenn (7–2) | Christie (0–1) | Brock (9) | 270 | 22–19 | 22–19 |
| 42 | May 30 | Northwestern | Bill Davis Stadium • Columbus, Ohio | 2–8 | Uberstine (3–3) | Haberthier (0–1) | None | 350 | 22–20 | 22–20 |

== Awards ==
=== Big Ten Conference Players of the Week ===
Weekly Awards
| Player | Award | Date Awarded | Ref. |
|---|---|---|---|
| Zach Dezenzo | Player of the Week | April 7, 2021 | |
| Seth Lonsway | Pitcher of the Week | April 7, 2021 | |
| Zach Dezenzo | Player of the Week | June 1, 2021 | |

=== Conference awards ===
Awards
| Player | Award | Date Awarded | Ref. |
|---|---|---|---|
| Connor Pohl | Second team All-Big Ten | May 30, 2021 | |
| Kade Kern | Second team All-Big Ten | May 30, 2021 | |
| Garrett Burhenn | Third team All-Big Ten | May 30, 2021 | |
| Seth Lonsway | Third team All-Big Ten | May 30, 2021 | |
| T. J. Brock | Third team All-Big Ten | May 30, 2021 | |
| Kade Kern | Freshman team All-Big Ten | May 30, 2021 | |

== 2021 MLB draft ==
| Player | Position | Round | Overall | MLB team |
|---|---|---|---|---|
| Seth Lonsway | LHP | 6 | 176 | San Francisco Giants |
| Garrett Burhenn | RHP | 9 | 255 | Detroit Tigers |
| Jack Neely | RHP | 11 | 333 | New York Yankees |
