= 2021 Northwestern Wildcats baseball team =

American college baseball season

2021 Northwestern Wildcats baseball
- Conference: Big Ten Conference
- Record: 15–21 (15–21 Big Ten)
- Head coach: Spencer Allen (6th season)
- Assistant coach: Charlie Tilson (1st season)
- Hitting coach: Dusty Napoleon (6th season)
- Pitching coach: Josh Reynolds (6th season)
- Home stadium: Rocky Miller Park

2021 Big Ten Conference baseball standings
| | Conf. | | | | Overall |
| Team | W | | L | PCT | W | | L | PCT |
|---|---|---|---|---|---|---|---|---|
| No. 19 Nebraska ‍†‍‍^{y} | 31 | – | 12 | .721 | 34 | – | 14 | .708 |
| No. 24 Maryland ‍‍‍^{y} | 28 | – | 16 | .636 | 30 | – | 18 | .625 |
| Michigan ‍‍‍^{y} | 27 | – | 17 | .614 | 27 | – | 19 | .587 |
| Indiana ‍‍‍ | 26 | – | 18 | .591 | 26 | – | 18 | .591 |
| Iowa ‍‍‍ | 26 | – | 18 | .591 | 26 | – | 18 | .591 |
| Ohio State ‍‍‍ | 22 | – | 20 | .524 | 22 | – | 20 | .524 |
| Illinois ‍‍‍ | 22 | – | 22 | .500 | 22 | – | 22 | .500 |
| Rutgers ‍‍‍ | 21 | – | 23 | .477 | 21 | – | 23 | .477 |
| Penn State ‍‍‍ | 18 | – | 24 | .429 | 18 | – | 24 | .429 |
| Northwestern ‍‍‍ | 15 | – | 21 | .417 | 15 | – | 21 | .417 |
| Michigan State ‍‍‍ | 17 | – | 27 | .386 | 17 | – | 27 | .386 |
| Purdue ‍‍‍ | 16 | – | 26 | .381 | 16 | – | 26 | .381 |
| Minnesota ‍‍‍ | 6 | – | 31 | .162 | 6 | – | 31 | .162 |
† – Conference champion y – Invited to the NCAA tournament As of June 7, 2021; Rankings from D1Baseball

The 2021 Northwestern Wildcats baseball team was a baseball team that represented Northwestern University in the 2021 NCAA Division I baseball season. The Wildcats were members of the Big Ten Conference and played their home games at Rocky Miller Park in Evanston, Illinois. They were led by sixth-year head coach Spencer Allen.

== Previous season ==
The Wildcats finished the 2020 NCAA Division I baseball season 6–6 overall (0–0 conference) and ninth place in conference standings, as the season was cut short in stages by March 12 due to the COVID-19 pandemic.

== Preseason ==
In October, 2020, the Wildcats announced the addition of Charlie Tilson to the coaching staff as a volunteer assistant.

== Roster ==
2021 Northwestern Wildcats baseball team
Players
Coaches

| # | Pos. | Name | B/T | Height | Weight | Year | Previous school | Home town |
|---|---|---|---|---|---|---|---|---|
| 1 | INF | Evan Minarovic | / | 5 ft 11 in (1.8 m) | 170 lb (77 kg) | So | The John Cooper School | The Woodlands, Texas |
| 2 | INF | Vincent Bianchina | / | 5 ft 10 in (1.78 m) | 180 lb (82 kg) | Fr | De La Salle H. S. | Lafayette, California |
| 4 | INF | Tony Livermore | / | 5 ft 9 in (1.75 m) | 160 lb (73 kg) | Fr | Mount Carmel H. S. | Chicago, Illinois |
| 5 | RHP | Tommy D'Alise | /R | 6 ft 1 in (1.85 m) | 190 lb (86 kg) | Jr | Lubbock-Cooper H. S. | Lubbock, Texas |
| 6 | INF | Shawn Goosenberg | R/R | 6 ft 1 in (1.85 m) | 195 lb (88 kg) | Jr | Calabasas H. S. | Encino, California |
| 7 | | David Dunn | R/ | 6 ft 2 in (1.88 m) | 190 lb (86 kg) | RS Jr | Blessed Trinity Catholic H. S. | Alpharetta, Georgia |
| 8 | LHP | Quinn Lavelle | /L | 6 ft 1 in (1.85 m) | 195 lb (88 kg) | Sr | St. Edward H. S. | Cleveland, Ohio |
| 9 | OF | Kyle Burnett Jr. | / | 6 ft 3 in (1.91 m) | 205 lb (93 kg) | RS Sr | Highland Park H. S. | Dallas, Texas |
| 10 | | Luke Tanner | / | 6 ft 1 in (1.85 m) | 180 lb (82 kg) | So | Windward School | Los Angeles, California |
| 11 | LHP | Jack Pagliarini | /L | 6 ft 1 in (1.85 m) | 185 lb (84 kg) | Sr | Springboro H. S. | Springboro, Ohio |
| 13 | | Stephen Hrustich | /R | 6 ft 0 in (1.83 m) | — | So | Parkview H. S. | Lilburn, Georgia |
| 14 | LHP | Parker Hanks | /L | 6 ft 1 in (1.85 m) | 190 lb (86 kg) | Jr | Ozark H. S. | Ozark, Missouri |
| 15 | RHP | Mike Doherty | /R | 6 ft 3 in (1.91 m) | 220 lb (100 kg) | Jr | Middlesex School | Sandwich, Massachusetts |
| 17 | | Ben Grable | /R | 6 ft 4 in (1.93 m) | 205 lb (93 kg) | Fr | Flintridge Preparatory School | Pasadena, California |
| 19 | LHP | Ryan Bader | /L | 6 ft 2 in (1.88 m) | 200 lb (91 kg) | Sr | Mukwonago H. S. | Mukwonago, Wisconsin |
| 20 | | Anthony Calarco | R/R | 6 ft 3 in (1.91 m) | 215 lb (98 kg) | Jr | New Trier H. S. | Wilmette, Illinois |
| 21 | RHP | Jack Sauser | /R | 6 ft 6 in (1.98 m) | 195 lb (88 kg) | So | University H. S. | Bloomington, Illinois |
| 22 | | Jay Beshears | /R | — | — | Fr | Community School of Naples | Naples, Florida |
| 23 | | Michael Trautwein | L/R | 6 ft 1 in (1.85 m) | 185 lb (84 kg) | Jr | Northview H. S. | Johns Creek, Georgia |
| 25 | RHP | Hank Christie | /R | 6 ft 1 in (1.85 m) | 185 lb (84 kg) | RS Sr | Oak Park and River Forest H. S. | Oak Park, Illinois |
| 26 | RHP | David Utagawa | /R | 6 ft 3 in (1.91 m) | 220 lb (100 kg) | Fr | Corona del Sol H. S. | Phoenix, Arizona |
| 27 | OF | Leo Kaplan | / | 6 ft 1 in (1.85 m) | 190 lb (86 kg) | Sr | Harvard-Westlake School | Santa Monica, California |
| 28 | RHP | Tyler Uberstine | /R | 6 ft 1 in (1.85 m) | 200 lb (91 kg) | RS Jr | Chaminade College Preparatory School | Manhattan Beach, California |
| 29 | | Charlie Bourbon | / | 6 ft 1 in (1.85 m) | 205 lb (93 kg) | Sr | Stevenson H. S. | Riverwoods, Illinois |
| 30 | RHP | Anthony Alepra | /R | 6 ft 4 in (1.93 m) | 190 lb (86 kg) | Sr | John F. Kennedy H. S. | Cedar Rapids, Iowa |
| 32 | OF | Ethan O'Donnell | / | 6 ft 1 in (1.85 m) | 180 lb (82 kg) | Fr | Regis Jesuit H. S. | Highlands Ranch, Colorado |
| 33 | OF | Casey O'Laughlin | L/ | 6 ft 1 in (1.85 m) | 215 lb (98 kg) | Sr | Fenwick H. S. | Glen Ellyn, Illinois |
| 34 | RHP | Coby Moe | /R | 6 ft 4 in (1.93 m) | 220 lb (100 kg) | So | Grayslake Central H. S. | Grayslake, Illinois |
| 35 | LHP | Sam Lawrence | /L | 6 ft 3 in (1.91 m) | 205 lb (93 kg) | RS Sr | Wheaton North H. S. | Winfield, Illinois |
| 39 | RHP | Kellen Pate | /R | 6 ft 3 in (1.91 m) | 185 lb (84 kg) | Fr | Shiloh Christian School | Rogers, Arkansas |
| 44 | RHP | Jack Dyke | /R | 6 ft 4 in (1.93 m) | 215 lb (98 kg) | So | St. Ignatius College Preparatory | San Francisco, California |
| 49 | RHP | Garrett Boeckle | /R | 5 ft 11 in (1.8 m) | 210 lb (95 kg) | Fr | Berkeley Preparatory School | Tampa, Florida |
| 55 | RHP | Reed Smith | /R | 5 ft 9 in (1.75 m) | 180 lb (82 kg) | So | The John Cooper School | Cypress, Texas |

Head coach

Spencer Allen

Assistant coach(es)

Hitting coach(es)

Dusty Napoleon

Base coach(es)

Charlie Tilson

Pitching coach(es)

Josh Reynolds

Legend

- (C) Team captain
- (S) Suspended
- (I) Ineligible
- Injured
- Current redshirt

Roster
Last update: March 4, 2021

== Schedule ==
2021 Northwestern Wildcats baseball game log
Regular season
March (9–5)

| # | Date | Opponent | Site/stadium | Score | Win | Loss | Save | Attendance | Overall record | B1G record |
|---|---|---|---|---|---|---|---|---|---|---|
| 1 | March 5 | vs Penn State | U.S. Bank Stadium • Minneapolis, Minnesota | 3–6 | Dees (1–0) | Bader (0–1) | Shingle (1) | 90 | 0–1 | 0–1 |
| 2 | March 6 | vs Penn State | U.S. Bank Stadium • Minneapolis, Minnesota | 2–0 | Uberstine (1–0) | Larkin (0–1) | Moe (1) | 50 | 1–1 | 1–1 |
| 3 | March 6 | vs Penn State | U.S. Bank Stadium • Minneapolis, Minnesota | 5–2 | Smith (1–0) | Freilich (0–1) | Lawrence (1) | 50 | 2–1 | 2–1 |
| 4 | March 7 | vs Penn State | U.S. Bank Stadium • Minneapolis, Minnesota | 10–13 | Rogers (1–0) | Grable (0–1) | Miller (1) | 75 | 2–2 | 2–2 |
| 5 | March 12 | vs Michigan State | Fluor Field at the West End • Greenville, South Carolina | 14–2 | Doherty (1–0) | Benschoter (0–1) | None | 225 | 3–2 | 3–2 |
| 6 | March 13 | vs Michigan State | Fluor Field at the West End • Greenville, South Carolina | 4–2 | Lavelle (1–0) | Erla (1–1) | Boeckle (1) | 225 | 4–2 | 4–2 |
| 7 | March 13 | vs Michigan State | Fluor Field at the West End • Greenville, South Carolina | 3–12 | Berghost (1–0) | Uberstine (1–1) | None | 225 | 4–3 | 4–3 |
| 8 | March 14 | vs Michigan State | Fluor Field at the West End • Greenville, South Carolina | 7–5 | Boeckle (1–0) | Iverson (0–1) | None | 201 | 5–3 | 5–3 |
| 9 | March 20 | at Minnesota | U.S. Bank Stadium • Minneapolis, Minnesota | 4–3 | Lavelle (2–0) | Skoro (1–2) | Moe (2) | 100 | 6–3 | 6–3 |
| 10 | March 21 | at Minnesota | U.S. Bank Stadium • Minneapolis, Minnesota | 10–3 | Uberstin (2–1) | Culliver (0–1) | None | 100 | 7–3 | 7–3 |
| 11 | March 22 | at Minnesota | U.S. Bank Stadium • Minneapolis, Minnesota | 3–7 | Burchill (1–0) | Saucer (0–1) | None | 75 | 7–4 | 7–4 |
| 12 | March 26 | at Illinois | Illinois Field • Champaign, Illinois | 8–12 | Lavender (3–0) | Boeckle (1–1) | None | 73 | 7–5 | 7–5 |
| 13 | March 27 | at Illinois | Illinois Field • Champaign, Illinois | 16–14 | Dyke (1–0) | Kutt (0–1) | Lawrence (2) | 81 | 8–5 | 8–5 |
| 14 | March 28 | at Illinois | Illinois Field • Champaign, Illinois | 12–5 | Lavelle (3–0) | Kirschsieper (1–2) | Smith (1) | 75 | 9–5 | 9–5 |

April (3–11)

| # | Date | Opponent | Site/stadium | Score | Win | Loss | Save | Attendance | Overall record | B1G record |
|---|---|---|---|---|---|---|---|---|---|---|
| 15 | April 2 | at Maryland | Bob "Turtle" Smith Stadium • College Park, Maryland | 3–4 | Falco (1–0) | Smith (1–1) | Bello (2) | 150 | 9–6 | 9–6 |
| 16 | April 3 | at Maryland | Bob "Turtle" Smith Stadium • College Park, Maryland | 4–8 | Ramsey (1–1) | Moe (0–1) | None | 150 | 9–7 | 9–7 |
| 17 | April 3 | vs No. 25 Michigan | Bob "Turtle" Smith Stadium • College Park, Maryland | 2–5 | Pace (2–0) | Boeckle (1–2) | Weiss (1) | 100 | 9–8 | 9–8 |
| 18 | April 4 | vs No. 25 Michigan | Bob "Turtle" Smith Stadium • College Park, Maryland | 4–1 | Lavelle (4–0) | Dragani (2–2) | Lawrence (3) | 100 | 10–8 | 10–8 |
| 19 | April 9 | Rutgers | Rocky Miller Park • Evanston, Illinois | 6–5 | Boeckle (2–2) | McLain (0–1) | None | 50 | 11–8 | 11–8 |
| 20 | April 10 | Rutgers | Rocky Miller Park • Evanston, Illinois | 4–8 | Wereski (4–1) | Uberstine (2–2) | Muller (2) | 50 | 11–9 | 11–9 |
| 21 | April 11 | Rutgers | Rocky Miller Park • Evanston, Illinois | 5–6 | Fitzpatrick (2–1) | Smith (2–1) | McLain (1) | 50 | 11–10 | 11–10 |
| 22 | April 16 | Indiana | Rocky Miller Park • Evanston, Illinois | 4–5 | Sommer (4–1) | Doherty (1–1) | Litwicki (4) | 57 | 11–11 | 11–11 |
| 23 | April 17 | Indiana | Rocky Miller Park • Evanston, Illinois | 8–5 | Lawrence (1–0) | Tucker (0–1) | None | 63 | 12–11 | 12–11 |
| 24 | April 18 | Indiana | Rocky Miller Park • Evanston, Illinois | 0–4 | Bierman (2–2) | Lavelle (4–1) | None | – | 12–12 | 12–12 |
| 25 | April 24 | vs Maryland | Duane Banks Field • Iowa City, Iowa | 1–2 | Ott (1–0) | Doherty (1–2) | Falco (1) | – | 12–13 | 12–13 |
| 26 | April 25 | vs Maryland | Duane Banks Field • Iowa City, Iowa | 7–9 | Fisher (1–3) | Uberstine (2–3) | None | – | 12–14 | 12–14 |
| 27 | April 25 | at Iowa | Duane Banks Field • Iowa City, Iowa | 4–15 | Baumann (4–2) | Lavelle (4–2) | None | 657 | 12–15 | 12–15 |
| 28 | April 26 | at Iowa | Duane Banks Field • Iowa City, Iowa | 9–12 | Nedved (3–0) | Smith (1–3) | None | 544 | 12–16 | 12–16 |
| – | April 30 | Michigan | Rocky Miller Park • Evanston, Illinois | Cancelled due to COVID-19 protocols | | | | | | |

May (3–5)

| # | Date | Opponent | Site/stadium | Score | Win | Loss | Save | Attendance | Overall record | B1G record |
|---|---|---|---|---|---|---|---|---|---|---|
| – | May 1 | Michigan | Rocky Miller Park • Evanston, Illinois | Cancelled due to COVID-19 protocols | | | | | | |
| – | May 2 | Illinois | Rocky Miller Park • Evanston, Illinois | Cancelled due to COVID-19 protocols | | | | | | |
| – | May 3 | Illinois | Rocky Miller Park • Evanston, Illinois | Cancelled due to COVID-19 protocols | | | | | | |
| – | May 7 | at Purdue | Alexander Field • West Lafayette, Indiana | Cancelled due to COVID-19 protocols | | | | | | |
| – | May 8 | at Purdue | Alexander Field • West Lafayette, Indiana | Cancelled due to COVID-19 protocols | | | | | | |
| – | May 9 | at Purdue | Alexander Field • West Lafayette, Indiana | Cancelled due to COVID-19 protocols | | | | | | |
| 29 | May 14 | at Nebraska | Haymarket Park • Lincoln, Nebraska | 2–12 | Povich (5–1) | Doherty (1–3) | None | 3,058 | 12–17 | 12–17 |
| 30 | May 15 | at Nebraska | Haymarket Park • Lincoln, Nebraska | 5–11 | Schreiber (2–2) | Pagliarini (0–1) | Bunz (1) | 3,523 | 12–18 | 12–18 |
| – | May 16 | at Nebraska | Haymarket Park • Lincoln, Nebraska | Cancelled due to COVID-19 protocols | | | | | | |
| 31 | May 21 | Iowa | Rocky Miller Park • Evanston, Illinois | 1–6 | Wallace (6–1) | Doherty (1–4) | None | 165 | 12–19 | 12–19 |
| 32 | May 22 | Iowa | Rocky Miller Park • Evanston, Illinois | 5–4 | Lawrence (2–0) | Nedved (4–1) | None | 213 | 13–19 | 13–19 |
| 33 | May 23 | Iowa | Rocky Miller Park • Evanston, Illinois | 8–6 | Pate (1–0) | Irvine (2–5) | None | 185 | 14–19 | 14–19 |
| 34 | May 28 | at Ohio State | Bill Davis Stadium • Columbus, Ohio | 10–13 | Pfennig (1–3) | Pate (1–1) | Brock (8) | 183 | 14–20 | 14–20 |
| 35 | May 29 | at Ohio State | Bill Davis Stadium • Columbus, Ohio | 1–4 | Burhenn (7–2) | Christie (0–1) | Brock (9) | 270 | 14–21 | 14–21 |
| 36 | May 30 | at Ohio State | Bill Davis Stadium • Columbus, Ohio | 8–2 | Uberstine (3–3) | Haberthier (0–1) | None | 350 | 15–21 | 15–21 |

== Awards ==
=== Big Ten Conference Players of the Week ===
Weekly Awards
| Player | Award | Date Awarded | Ref. |
|---|---|---|---|
| Shawn Goosenberg | Player of the Week | March 30, 2021 | |
| Shawn Goosenberg | Player of the Week | April 13, 2021 | |

=== Conference awards ===
Awards
| Player | Award | Date Awarded | Ref. |
|---|---|---|---|
| Anthony Calarco | Fird team All-Big Ten | May 30, 2021 | |
| Shawn Goosenberg | Fird team All-Big Ten | May 30, 2021 | |
| Michael Trautwein | Second team All-Big Ten | May 30, 2021 | |
| Ethan O'Donnell | Freshman team All-Big Ten | May 30, 2021 | |

== 2021 MLB draft ==
| Player | Position | Round | Overall | MLB team |
|---|---|---|---|---|
| Michael Trautwein | C | 13 | 390 | Cincinnati Reds |
| Tyler Uberstine | RHP | 19 | 556 | Boston Red Sox |
| Shawn Goosenberg | SS | 19 | 575 | Chicago White Sox |
