= 2021 Maryland Terrapins baseball team =

Baseball team season

2021 Maryland Terrapins baseball

NCAA Greenville Regional
- Conference: Big Ten Conference
- Record: 30–18 (28–16 Big Ten)
- Head coach: Rob Vaughn (4th season)
- Assistant coach: Anthony Papio (4th season)
- Hitting coach: Matt Swope (4th season)
- Pitching coach: Corey Muscara (4th season)
- Home stadium: Bob "Turtle" Smith Stadium

2021 Big Ten Conference baseball standings
	Conf.				Overall
Team	W		L	PCT	W		L	PCT
No. 19 Nebraska ‍†‍‍^{y}	31	–	12	.721	34	–	14	.708
No. 24 Maryland ‍‍‍^{y}	28	–	16	.636	30	–	18	.625
Michigan ‍‍‍^{y}	27	–	17	.614	27	–	19	.587
Indiana ‍‍‍	26	–	18	.591	26	–	18	.591
Iowa ‍‍‍	26	–	18	.591	26	–	18	.591
Ohio State ‍‍‍	22	–	20	.524	22	–	20	.524
Illinois ‍‍‍	22	–	22	.500	22	–	22	.500
Rutgers ‍‍‍	21	–	23	.477	21	–	23	.477
Penn State ‍‍‍	18	–	24	.429	18	–	24	.429
Northwestern ‍‍‍	15	–	21	.417	15	–	21	.417
Michigan State ‍‍‍	17	–	27	.386	17	–	27	.386
Purdue ‍‍‍	16	–	26	.381	16	–	26	.381
Minnesota ‍‍‍	6	–	31	.162	6	–	31	.162
† – Conference champion y – Invited to the NCAA tournament As of June 7, 2021; Rankings from D1Baseball

The Maryland Terrapins baseball team was a baseball team that represented the University of Maryland, College Park in the 2021 NCAA Division I baseball season. The Terrapins were members of the Big Ten Conference and played their home games at Bob "Turtle" Smith Stadium in College Park, Maryland. They were led by fourth-year head coach Rob Vaughn.

== Previous season ==
The Terrapins finished the 2020 NCAA Division I baseball season 10–5 overall (0–0 conference) and first place in conference standings, as the season was cut short in stages by March 12 due to the COVID-19 pandemic.

== Preseason ==
For the 2021 Big Ten Conference poll, Maryland was voted to finish in fifth by the Big Ten Coaches.

== Roster ==
2021 Maryland Terrapins baseball team
Players
Coaches

#	Pos.	Name	B/T	Height	Weight	Year	Previous school	Home town
1	INF	Ben Cowles	R/R	6 ft 1 in (1.85 m)	180 lb (82 kg)	Jr	Newark H. S.	Newark, New York
3	OF	Randy Bednar	/	5 ft 11 in (1.8 m)	200 lb (91 kg)	Sr	Landon School	Bethesda, Maryland
4	INF	Maxwell Costes	/	6 ft 1 in (1.85 m)	215 lb (98 kg)	Jr	Gilman School	Baltimore, Maryland
5	INF	Tommy Gardiner	/	5 ft 8 in (1.73 m)	160 lb (73 kg)	Sr	Lenape H. S.	Mount Laurel, New Jersey
6	INF	Matthew Shaw	/	5 ft 11 in (1.8 m)	185 lb (84 kg)	Fr	Worcester Academy	Brimfield, Massachusetts
8	INF	Kevin Keister	/	5 ft 9 in (1.75 m)	180 lb (82 kg)	Fr	Caravel Academy	Smyrna, Delaware
9	C	Riley Langerman	/	6 ft 1 in (1.85 m)	175 lb (79 kg)	Jr	Ventura College	Parker, Colorado
10	RHP	Will Glock	/R	5 ft 11 in (1.8 m)	190 lb (86 kg)	RS So	Loyola Blakefield	Fallston, Maryland
11	OF	Chris Alleyne	/	5 ft 9 in (1.75 m)	175 lb (79 kg)	Sr	Chestnut Hill Academy	Philadelphia, Pennsylvania
12	LHP	Tyler Blohm	/L	6 ft 4 in (1.93 m)	205 lb (93 kg)	RS Sr	Archbishop Spalding H. S.	Severna Park, Maryland
13	INF	Matt Orlando	/	5 ft 11 in (1.8 m)	180 lb (82 kg)	So	Los Osos H. S.	Marlton, New Jersey
14	OF	Tony Schreffler Jr.	/	6 ft 1 in (1.85 m)	190 lb (86 kg)	So	Central Dauphin H. S.	Harrisburg, Pennsylvania
15	RHP	Sam Bello	/R	6 ft 3 in (1.91 m)	225 lb (102 kg)	So	Iona Preparatory School	West Nyack, New York
16	RHP	Chris Chaney	/R	6 ft 1 in (1.85 m)	195 lb (88 kg)	So	St. James School	Falling Waters, West Virginia
17	RHP	Trevor LaBonte	/R	6 ft 6 in (1.98 m)	210 lb (95 kg)		York H. S.	York, Maine
18	RHP	Sean Burke	/R	6 ft 6 in (1.98 m)	230 lb (104 kg)	RS So	Saint John's H. S.	Sutton, Massachusetts
20	LHP	Ryan Murphy	/L	6 ft 4 in (1.93 m)	225 lb (102 kg)	Fr	Billerica Memorial H. S.	Billerica, Massachusetts
21	RHP	Chris Bookhultz	/R	5 ft 10 in (1.78 m)	190 lb (86 kg)	Fr	St. John's College H. S.	Brookeville, Maryland
22	RHP	Sean Heine	/R	6 ft 4 in (1.93 m)	210 lb (95 kg)	Jr	Shawnee H. S.	Medford, New Jersey
23	LHP	Drew Wilden	/L	6 ft 1 in (1.85 m)	195 lb (88 kg)	RS Jr	West Deptford H. S.	West Deptford Township, New Jersey
24	C	Blake Badman	/	6 ft 0 in (1.83 m)	215 lb (98 kg)	Fr	DeMatha Catholic H. S.	Huntington, Maryland
25	C	Justin Vought	/	6 ft 3 in (1.91 m)	195 lb (88 kg)	Sr	Wyoming Valley West H. S.	Wilkes-Barre, Pennsylvania
26	RHP	Connor Staine	/R	6 ft 3 in (1.91 m)	200 lb (91 kg)	So	West Morris Central H. S.	Clinton, New Jersey
27	C	Luke Shliger	/	5 ft 9 in (1.75 m)	180 lb (82 kg)	Fr	Trinity-Pawling School	Danbury, Connecticut
28	RHP	David Falco	/R	5 ft 9 in (1.75 m)	180 lb (82 kg)	Fr	Trinity-Pawling School	Danbury, Connecticut
29	RHP	Elliot Zoellner	/R	6 ft 3 in (1.91 m)	190 lb (86 kg)	RS Sr	St. Mary's H. S.	Annapolis, Maryland
30	LHP	Sean Fisher	/L	6 ft 0 in (1.83 m)	214 lb (97 kg)	Sr	Parkside H. S.	Parsonsburg, Maryland
32	LHP	Ryan Ramsey	/L	6 ft 0 in (1.83 m)	190 lb (86 kg)	So	Pascack Hills H. S.	Montvale, New Jersey
33	RHP	Mark Diluia	/R	6 ft 3 in (1.91 m)	185 lb (84 kg)	Sr	Marian Catholic H. S.	Flossmoor, Illinois
34	RHP	Zach Thompson	/R	6 ft 1 in (1.85 m)	190 lb (86 kg)	RS Sr	Archbishop Spalding H. S.	West River, Maryland
35	INF	Aaron Perez	/	5 ft 9 in (1.75 m)	180 lb (82 kg)	So	All Hallows H. S.	New York, New York
36	OF	Tucker Flint	/	6 ft 2 in (1.88 m)	205 lb (93 kg)	So	Bishop Hendricken H. S.	East Greenwich, Rhode Island
37		Logan Ott	/L	5 ft 11 in (1.8 m)	190 lb (86 kg)	Fr	Montoursville Area H. S.	Montoursville, Pennsylvania
38	C	James Heffley	/	5 ft 11 in (1.8 m)	165 lb (75 kg)	RS Fr	Albert Einstein H. S.	Kensington, Maryland
39	RHP	Gavin Stellpflug	/R	6 ft 6 in (1.98 m)	210 lb (95 kg)	Fr	Somerville H. S.	Whitehouse Station, New Jersey
40	INF	Michael Bouma	/	6 ft 1 in (1.85 m)	210 lb (95 kg)	So	Sherwood H. S.	Brookeville, Maryland
41	OF	Bobby Zmarzlak	/	6 ft 5 in (1.96 m)	205 lb (93 kg)	So	Westhill H. S.	Stamford, Connecticut
42	RHP	Nick Dean	/R	6 ft 3 in (1.91 m)	180 lb (82 kg)	So	Bensalem H. S.	Bensalem, Pennsylvania
43	INF	Austin Chavis	/	5 ft 11 in (1.8 m)	180 lb (82 kg)	Sr	Calvert Hall College H. S.	Bel Air, Maryland
44	RHP	Nigel Belgrave	/R	6 ft 4 in (1.93 m)	195 lb (88 kg)	Fr	Auburn H. S.	Auburn, Massachusetts
45	RHP	Jason Savacool	/R	6 ft 1 in (1.85 m)	210 lb (95 kg)	Fr	Charles W. Baker H. S.	Baldwinsville, New York

Head coach

Rob Vaughn

Assistant coach(es)

Hitting coach(es)

Matt Swope

Base coach(es)

Anthony Papio

Pitching coach(es)

Corey Muscara

Legend

- (C) Team captain
- (S) Suspended
- (I) Ineligible
- Injured
- Current redshirt

Roster

== Schedule ==
2021 Maryland Terrapins baseball game log
Regular season
March (6–9)

#	Date	Opponent	Site/stadium	Score	Win	Loss	Save	Attendance	Overall record	B1G record
1	March 5	vs Michigan State	Fluor Field at the West End • Greenville, South Carolina	0–6	Benschoter (1–0)	Burke (0–1)	None	328	0–1	0–1
2	March 6	vs Michigan State	Fluor Field at the West End • Greenville, South Carolina	4–7	Erla (1–0)	Fisher (0–1)	Iverson (1)	313	0–2	0–2
3	March 6	vs Michigan State	Fluor Field at the West End • Greenville, South Carolina	4–5	Christophersen (1–0)	Bello (0–1)	Iverson (2)	313	0–3	0–3
4	March 7	vs Michigan State	Fluor Field at the West End • Greenville, South Carolina	3–2	Savacool (1–0)	Powers (0–1)	None	307	1–3	1–3
5	March 12	at Rutgers	Bainton Field • Piscataway, New Jersey	13–8	Burke (1–1)	Rutkowski (1–1)	None	250	2–3	2–3
6	March 13	at Rutgers	Bainton Field • Piscataway, New Jersey	3–9	Wereski (2–0)	Fisher (0–2)	Muller (1)	250	2–4	2–4
7	March 13	at Rutgers	Bainton Field • Piscataway, New Jersey	7–8	Stanavich (1–0)	Staine (0–1)	Fitzpatrick (2)	250	2–5	2–5
8	March 14	at Rutgers	Bainton Field • Piscataway, New Jersey	9–5	Savacool (2–0)	Hoopes (0–2)	None	250	3–5	3–5
9	March 20	at Penn State	Medlar Field • University Park, Pennsylvania	19–10	Blohm (1–0)	Gagnon (0–1)	Bello (1)	302	4–5	4–5
10	March 21	at Penn State	Medlar Field • University Park, Pennsylvania	5–6	Shingledecker (1–1)	Zoellner (0–1)	None	282	4–6	4–6
11	March 22	at Penn State	Medlar Field • University Park, Pennsylvania	7–1	Savacool (3–0)	Virbitsky (0–2)	None	205	5–6	5–6
12	March 27	vs Iowa	Bill Davis Stadium • Columbus, Ohio	4–6	Hoffman (1–0)	Ramsey (0–1)	Nedved (4)	–	5–7	5–7
13	March 28	vs Iowa	Bill Davis Stadium • Columbus, Ohio	2–11	Davitt (2–1)	Staine (0–2)	None	–	5–8	5–8
14	March 28	at Ohio State	Bill Davis Stadium • Columbus, Ohio	4–5	Root (3–1)	Fisher (0–3)	Brock (4)	180	5–9	5–9
15	March 29	at Ohio State	Bill Davis Stadium • Columbus, Ohio	9–3	Savacool (4–0)	Pfenning (0–2)	Ramsey (1)	107	6–9	6–9

April (11–4)

#	Date	Opponent	Site/stadium	Score	Win	Loss	Save	Attendance	Overall record	B1G record
16	April 2	Northwestern	Bob "Turtle" Smith Stadium • College Park, Maryland	4–3	Falco (1–0)	Smith (1–1)	Bello (2)	150	7–9	7–9
17	April 3	Northwestern	Bob "Turtle" Smith Stadium • College Park, Maryland	8–4	Ramsey (1–1)	Moe (0–1)	None	150	8–9	8–9
18	April 4	No. 25 Michigan	Bob "Turtle" Smith Stadium • College Park, Maryland	5–6	Weiss (3–1)	Falco (1–1)	None'	150	8–10	8–10
19	April 5	No. 25 Michigan	Bob "Turtle" Smith Stadium • College Park, Maryland	17–7	Blohm (2–0)	Paige (0–1)	Bello (3)	100	9–10	9–10
20	April 9	at Nebraska	Haymarket Park • Lincoln, Nebraska	2–6	Povich (3–1)	Burke (1–2)	None	2361	9–11	9–11
21	April 10	at Nebraska	Haymarket Park • Lincoln, Nebraska	10–7	Ramsey (2–1)	Bragg (1–2)	Bello (4)	3197	10–11	10–11
22	April 11	at Nebraska	Haymarket Park • Lincoln, Nebraska	3–14	Schanaman (3–0)	Savacool (4–1)	None	3188	10–12	10–12
23	April 16	Ohio State	Bob "Turtle" Smith Stadium • College Park, Maryland	10–6	Burke (2–2)	Burhenn (2–2)	None	100	11–12	11–12
24	April 17	Ohio State	Bob "Turtle" Smith Stadium • College Park, Maryland	5–4	Falco (2–1)	Brock (0–1)	None	10	12–12	12–12
25	April 18	Ohio State	Bob "Turtle" Smith Stadium • College Park, Maryland	9–4	Savacool (5–1)	Neely (1–2)	None	100	13–12	13–12
26	April 23	at Iowa	Duane Banks Field • Iowa City, Iowa	2–6	Hoffman (3–0)	Burke (2–3)	Nedved (6)	528	13–13	13–13
27	April 24	at Iowa	Duane Banks Field • Iowa City, Iowa	8–6	Dean (1–0)	Irvine (2–3)	Bello (5)	1,112	14–13	14–13
28	April 24	vs Northwestern	Duane Banks Field • Iowa City, Iowa	2–1	Ott (1–0)	Doherty (1–2)	Falco (1)	–	15–13	15–13
29	April 25	vs Northwestern	Duane Banks Field • Iowa City, Iowa	9–7	Fisher (1–3)	Uberstine (2–3)	None	–	16–13	16–13
30	April 30	Minnesota	Bob "Turtle" Smith Stadium • College Park, Maryland	12–4	Dean (2–0)	Schoeberl (0–4)	None	100	17–13	17–13

May (11–3)

#	Date	Opponent	Site/stadium	Score	Win	Loss	Save	Attendance	Overall record	B1G record
31	May 1	Minnesota	Bob "Turtle" Smith Stadium • College Park, Maryland	4–3	Fisher (2–3)	DeLuga (0–1)	None	250	18–13	18–13
32	May 2	Minnesota	Bob "Turtle" Smith Stadium • College Park, Maryland	6–3	Falco (3–1)	Skoro (2–3)	Bello (6)	250	19–13	19–13
33	May 7	at Illinois	Illinois Field • Champaign, Illinois	0–2	Hoffmann (2–0)	Dean (2–1)	Kirschsieper (2)	158	19–14	19–14
34	May 8	at Illinois	Illinois Field • Champaign, Illinois	5–3	Savacool (6–1)	Lavender (5–2)	Bello (7)	141	20–14	20–14
35	May 9	at Illinois	Illinois Field • Champaign, Illinois	12–4	Ramsey (3–1)	Gowens (1–3)	None	167	21–14	21–14
36	May 14	Purdue	Bob "Turtle" Smith Stadium • College Park, Maryland	11–0	Dean (3–1)	Schapira (0–6)	None	150	22–14	22–14
37	May 15	Purdue	Bob "Turtle" Smith Stadium • College Park, Maryland	6–1	Savacool (7–1)	Johnson (2–5)	Ramsey (2)	250	23–14	23–14
38	May 16	Purdue	Bob "Turtle" Smith Stadium • College Park, Maryland	7–2	Burke (3–3)	Brooks (2–3)	Zoellner (1)	250	24–14	24–14
39	May 21	at No. 24 Michigan	Ray Fisher Stadium • Ann Arbor, Michigan	11–8	Ramsey (4–1)	Proctor (0–1)	None	250	25–14	25–14
40	May 22	at No. 24 Michigan	Ray Fisher Stadium • Ann Arbor, Michigan	3–14	Weston (6–3)	Savacool (7–2)	Dragani (1)	250	25–15	25–15
41	May 23	at No. 24 Michigan	Ray Fisher Stadium • Ann Arbor, Michigan	7–3	Burke (4–3)	Denner (4–4)	None	250	26–15	26–15
42	May 29	Indiana	Bob "Turtle" Smith Stadium • College Park, Maryland	4–3	Ramsey (5–1)	Macciocchi (0–1)	None	250	27–15	27–15
43	May 29	Indiana	Bob "Turtle" Smith Stadium • College Park, Maryland	5–2	Burke (5–3)	Brown (5–4)	None	250	28–15	28–15
44	May 30	Indiana	Bob "Turtle" Smith Stadium • College Park, Maryland	3–7	Stahl (3–0)	Blohm (2–1)	None	500	28–16	28–16

Postseason
NCAA Tournament: Greenville Regional (1–1)

#	Date	Opponent	Site/stadium	Score	Win	Loss	Save	Attendance	Overall record	B1G record
45	June 4	vs Charlotte	Clark–LeClair Stadium • Greenville, North Carolina	10–13	Marozas (5–3)	Savacool (7–3)	Giesting (1)	4,174	28–17	28–16
46	June 5	vs Norfolk State	Clark–LeClair Stadium • Greenville, North Carolina	16–0	Burke (6–3)	Hosley (7–2)	Thompson (1)	4,196	29–17	28–16
47	June 6	vs Charlotte	Clark–LeClair Stadium • Greenville, North Carolina	2–1	Zoellner (1–1)	Lindsey (6–2)	None	5,017	30–17	28–16
48	June 6	vs East Carolina	Clark–LeClair Stadium • Greenville, North Carolina	6–9	Colmore (7–1)	Staine (0–3)	Bridges (5)	5,017	30–18	28–16

== Awards ==
=== Big Ten Conference Players of the Week ===
Weekly Awards
Player	Award	Date Awarded	Ref.
Jason Savacool	Freshman of the Week	March 10, 2021	
Ben Cowles	Player of the Week	March 16, 2021	
Jason Savacool	Freshman of the Week	March 23, 2021	
Justin Vought	Player of the Week	May 11, 2021	
Jason Savacool	Freshman of the Week	May 11, 2021	
Matt Shaw	Freshman of the Week	May 25, 2021	

=== Conference awards ===
Awards
Player	Award	Date Awarded	Ref.
Ben Cowles	First Team All-Big Ten	May 30, 2021	
Chris Alleyne	Second Team All-Big Ten	May 30, 2021	
Ryan Ramsey	Second Team All-Big Ten	May 30, 2021	
Luke Shliger	Freshman Team All-Big Ten	May 30, 2021	
Jason Savacool	Freshman Team All-Big Ten	May 30, 2021	
Matt Shaw	Freshman Team All-Big Ten	May 30, 2021	
