= 2021 Michigan Wolverines baseball team =

Baseball team season

2021 Michigan Wolverines baseball

NCAA tournament, South Bend Regional
- Conference: Big Ten Conference
- Record: 27–19 (27–17 Big Ten)
- Head coach: Erik Bakich (9th season)
- Assistant coach: Nick Schnabel (9th season)
- Pitching coach: Steve Merriman (1st season)
- Home stadium: Wilpon Baseball Complex

2021 Big Ten Conference baseball standings
	Conf.				Overall
Team	W		L	PCT	W		L	PCT
No. 19 Nebraska ‍†‍‍^{y}	31	–	12	.721	34	–	14	.708
No. 24 Maryland ‍‍‍^{y}	28	–	16	.636	30	–	18	.625
Michigan ‍‍‍^{y}	27	–	17	.614	27	–	19	.587
Indiana ‍‍‍	26	–	18	.591	26	–	18	.591
Iowa ‍‍‍	26	–	18	.591	26	–	18	.591
Ohio State ‍‍‍	22	–	20	.524	22	–	20	.524
Illinois ‍‍‍	22	–	22	.500	22	–	22	.500
Rutgers ‍‍‍	21	–	23	.477	21	–	23	.477
Penn State ‍‍‍	18	–	24	.429	18	–	24	.429
Northwestern ‍‍‍	15	–	21	.417	15	–	21	.417
Michigan State ‍‍‍	17	–	27	.386	17	–	27	.386
Purdue ‍‍‍	16	–	26	.381	16	–	26	.381
Minnesota ‍‍‍	6	–	31	.162	6	–	31	.162
† – Conference champion y – Invited to the NCAA tournament As of June 7, 2021; Rankings from D1Baseball

The 2021 Michigan Wolverines baseball team represented the University of Michigan in the 2021 NCAA Division I baseball season. The Wolverines, led by head coach Erik Bakich in his ninth season, are a member of the Big Ten Conference and played their home games at Wilpon Baseball Complex in Ann Arbor, Michigan.

== Previous season ==
The Wolverines finished the 2020 season 8–7 overall, in a season shortened due to the COVID-19 pandemic.

== Preseason ==
On November 6, 2020, former Michigan pitching coach Chris Fetter was named pitching coach for the Detroit Tigers of Major League Baseball (MLB).

On January 29, 2021, Steve Merriman was named pitching coach and Brandon Inge was named volunteer assistant coach for the Wolverines.

Michigan was ranked No. 20 by Baseball America and No. 18 by Collegiate Baseball Newspaper in the preseason polls, the only Big Ten Conference team named in each poll. Redshirt sophomore Steven Hajjar was named to the Preseason All-America Third Team. On March 4, the Big Ten Coaches voted Michigan as the preseason favorite to win the conference.

== Roster ==
2021 Michigan Wolverines baseball team
Players
Coaches

#	Pos.	Name	B/T	Height	Weight	Year	Previous school	Home town
0	INF	Dan Blomgren	R/R	5 ft 10 in (1.78 m)	165 lb (75 kg)	Jr	Craig	Milton, Wisconsin
2	INF	Benjamin Sems	L/R	6 ft 3 in (1.91 m)	200 lb (91 kg)	Sr	Westminster Christian	Chesterfield, Missouri
3	INF	Ted Burton	R/R	6 ft 2 in (1.88 m)	170 lb (77 kg)	So	Edison	Huntington Beach, California
4	INF	Brandon Lawrence	S/R	5 ft 10 in (1.78 m)	195 lb (88 kg)	Fr	Dunn	Santa Ynez, California
5	OF	Christian Bullock	L/L	5 ft 10 in (1.78 m)	175 lb (79 kg)	Sr	Morgan Park	Chicago, Illinois
6	RHP	Danny Zimmerman	R/R	6 ft 4 in (1.93 m)	225 lb (102 kg)	RS Jr	Redondo Union	Redondo Beach, California
7	OF	Jake Marti	S/R	6 ft 4 in (1.93 m)	200 lb (91 kg)	So	Normal West	Bloomington, Illinois
8	INF	Jimmy Obertop	R/R	6 ft 1 in (1.85 m)	220 lb (100 kg)	So	Westminster Christian Academy	St. Louis, Missouri
9	INF	Dylan Stanton	R/R	6 ft 1 in (1.85 m)	190 lb (86 kg)	RS Fr	Gull Lake	Richland, Michigan
10	INF	Cam Hart	R/R	6 ft 4 in (1.93 m)	205 lb (93 kg)	Jr	Armada	Armada, Michigan
12	INF	Riley Bertram	S/R	6 ft 0 in (1.83 m)	180 lb (82 kg)	Jr	Zionsville	Zionsville, Indiana
13	C	Griffin Mazur	R/R	5 ft 10 in (1.78 m)	180 lb (82 kg)	Sr	Moorpark	Moorpark, California
14	C	Christian Molfetta	L/L	5 ft 10 in (1.78 m)	190 lb (86 kg)	RS Sr	Junípero Serra	Laguna Beach, California
15	INF	Clark Elliott	L/R	5 ft 10 in (1.78 m)	170 lb (77 kg)	So	Barrington	Barrington, Illinois
17	RHP	Will Proctor	R/R	6 ft 1 in (1.85 m)	200 lb (91 kg)	Jr	Mira Costa	Manhattan Beach, California
18	C	Jordan Rodgers	R/R	5 ft 8 in (1.73 m)	175 lb (79 kg)	RS So	Simeon Career Academy	Chicago, Illinois
19	LHP	Logan Wood	L/L	6 ft 2 in (1.88 m)	195 lb (88 kg)	Fr	OLSM Prep	Macomb, Michigan
20	RHP	Willie Weiss	R/R	6 ft 3 in (1.91 m)	205 lb (93 kg)	Jr	Westview	Portland, Oregon
21	LHP	Ben Dragani	L/L	6 ft 5 in (1.96 m)	225 lb (102 kg)	RS Jr	Catholic Memorial	Brookfield, Wisconsin
22	INF	Tito Flores	R/R	5 ft 10 in (1.78 m)	185 lb (84 kg)	So	Brother Rice	Detroit, Michigan
24	INF	Matt Frey	L/R	5 ft 11 in (1.8 m)	195 lb (88 kg)	So	Franklin Regional	Murrysville, Pennsylvania
25	RHP	Isaiah Paige	R/R	6 ft 1 in (1.85 m)	200 lb (91 kg)	RS Jr	Damien	Diamond Bar, California
26	OF	Joey Velazquez	L/L	6 ft 0 in (1.83 m)	215 lb (98 kg)	So	St. Francis DeSales	Lewis Center, Ohio
27	LHP	Steve Hajjar	R/L	6 ft 5 in (1.96 m)	215 lb (98 kg)	Jr	Central Catholic	Andover, Massachusetts
28	RHP	Keaton Carratini	R/R	6 ft 2 in (1.88 m)	190 lb (86 kg)	Jr	La Costa Canyon	Encinitas, California
29	RHP	Blake Beers	R/R	6 ft 4 in (1.93 m)	215 lb (98 kg)	Sr	Loyola	Manhattan Beach, California
30	LHP	Jack White	L/L	6 ft 3 in (1.91 m)	195 lb (88 kg)	Jr	Athens Academy	Bethesda, Maryland
32	RHP	Joe Pace	R/R	5 ft 9 in (1.75 m)	200 lb (91 kg)	Sr	Notre Dame	Valley Village, California
34	RHP	Ahmad Harajli	R/R	6 ft 4 in (1.93 m)	240 lb (109 kg)	Fr	IMG Academy	Dearborn, Michigan
35	LHP	Walker Cleveland	L/L	6 ft 2 in (1.88 m)	145 lb (66 kg)	Jr	North Gwinnett	Suwanee, Georgia
36	INF	Trevor Kilinski	L/R	6 ft 1 in (1.85 m)	195 lb (88 kg)	Fr	Zeeland West	Zeeland, Michigan
37	RHP	Chase Allen	R/R	6 ft 5 in (1.96 m)	210 lb (95 kg)	Fr	Regis Jesuit	Littleton, Colorado
39	LHP	Cononr O'Halloran	R/L	6 ft 5 in (1.96 m)	210 lb (95 kg)	Fr	St. Martin	Mississauga, Ontario
40	LHP	Angelo Smith	L/L	5 ft 9 in (1.75 m)	160 lb (73 kg)	Sr	Richards	Thornton, Illinois
43	OF	Patrick Mastrian	R/R	6 ft 0 in (1.83 m)	200 lb (91 kg)	Fr	Bishop Chatard	Indianapolis, Indiana
45	INF	Logan Pollack	L/R	6 ft 2 in (1.88 m)	185 lb (84 kg)	Sr	Notre Dame Academy	Los Angeles, California
47	LHP	Jacob Denner	L/L	6 ft 0 in (1.83 m)	215 lb (98 kg)	So	Bergen Catholic	Closter, New Jersey
48	RHP	Noah Rennard	R/R	6 ft 3 in (1.91 m)	220 lb (100 kg)	So	Maria Carrillo	Santa Rosa, California
49	OF	Ian Kennedy	R/R	6 ft 3 in (1.91 m)	225 lb (102 kg)	Fr	Whitefield Academy	Douglasville, Georgia
51	RHP	Carlos Anziani	R/R	6 ft 5 in (1.96 m)	225 lb (102 kg)	Fr	James Monroe	Bronx, New York
51	INF	Jack Van Remortel	R/R	6 ft 1 in (1.85 m)	220 lb (100 kg)	So	Carmel	Carmel, Indiana
54	RHP	Ryan Zimmer	R/R	6 ft 5 in (1.96 m)	220 lb (100 kg)	Fr	St. Clair High School	St. Clair, Michigan
55	RHP	Cameron Weston	R/R	6 ft 1 in (1.85 m)	200 lb (91 kg)	So	Canon-McMillan	Canonsburg, Pennsylvania

Head coach

Erik Bakich

Assistant coach(es)

Nick Schnabel

Pitching coach(es)

Steve Merriman

Legend

- (C) Team captain
- (S) Suspended
- (I) Ineligible
- Injured
- Current redshirt

Roster
Last update: January 27, 2021

== Schedule ==
2021 Michigan Wolverines baseball game log
Regular season (27–17)

March (11–4)
#	Date	Opponent	Rank	Stadium Site	Score	Win	Loss	Save	Attendance	Overall Record	B1G Record
1	March 6	vs. Iowa		Dell Diamond; Round Rock, Texas	4–2	**Weiss** (1–0)	Beutel (0–1)	—	150	1–0	1–0
2	March 7	vs. Iowa		Dell Diamond; Round Rock, Texas	3–8 ^{(7)}	Nedved (1–0)	**Weston** (0–1)	—	150	1–1	1–1
3	March 7	vs. Iowa		Dell Diamond; Round Rock, Texas	7–0	**Denner** (1–0)	Baumann (0–1)	—	150	2–1	2–1
4	March 8	vs. Iowa		Dell Diamond; Round Rock, Texas	11–4	**Dragani** (1–0)	Lee (0–1)	—	150	3–1	3–1
5	March 12	vs. Purdue		Fluor Field; Greenville, South Carolina	9–1	**Hajjar** (1–0)	Johnson (0–1)	—	225	4–1	4–1
6	March 13	vs. Purdue		Fluor Field; Greenville, South Carolina	4–0 ^{(7)}	**Weston** (1–1)	Schapira (0–2)	—	225	5–1	5–1
7	March 13	vs. Purdue		Fluor Field; Greenville, South Carolina	9–2	**Dragani** (2–0)	Starnes (0–1)	—	225	6–1	6–1
8	March 14	vs. Purdue		Fluor Field; Greenville, South Carolina	11–6	**Pace** (1–0)	Daniel (0–1)	—	225	7–1	7–1
9	March 19	Illinois	No. 22	Ray Fisher Stadium; Ann Arbor, Michigan	4–7	Lavender (2–0)	**Dragani** (2–1)	—	250	7–2	7–2
10	March 20	Illinois	No. 22	Ray Fisher Stadium; Ann Arbor, Michigan	8–1	**Weston** (2–1)	Gowens (1–1)	—	250	8–2	8–2
11	March 21	Michigan State	No. 22	Ray Fisher Stadium; Ann Arbor, Michigan	8–7	**Smith** (1–0)	Beatson (0–1)	—	250	9–2	9–2
12	March 22	Michigan State	No. 18	Ray Fisher Stadium; Ann Arbor, Michigan	0–3	Powers (1–1)	**Beers** (0–1)	Iverson (3)	250	9–3	9–3
13	March 26	at Penn State	No. 18	Medlar Field; State College, Pennsylvania	2–3 ^{(10)}	Mellott (1–0)	**Weiss** (1–1)	—	238	9–4	9–4
14	March 27	at Penn State	No. 18	Medlar Field; State College, Pennsylvania	17–4	**Weston** (3–1)	Larkin (0–3)	—	1	10–4	10–4
15	March 27	at Penn State	No. 18	Medlar Field; State College, Pennsylvania	8–6 ^{(10)}	**Weiss** (2–1)	Miller (0–1)	—	351	11–4	11–4

April (8–5)
#	Date	Opponent	Rank	Stadium Site	Score	Win	Loss	Save	Attendance	Overall Record	B1G Record
16	April 3	Northwestern	No. 25	Shipley Field; College Park, Maryland	5–2	**Pace** (2–0)	Boeckle (1–2)	**Weiss** (1)	100	12–4	12–4
17	April 4	Northwestern	No. 25	Shipley Field; College Park, Maryland	1–4	Lavelle (4–0)	**Dragani** (2–2)	Lawrence (3)	100	12–5	12–5
18	April 4	at Maryland	No. 25	Shipley Field; College Park, Maryland	6–5	**Weiss** (3–1)	Falco (1–1)	—	150	13–5	13–5
19	April 5	at Maryland	No. 25	Shipley Field; College Park, Maryland	7–17	Blohm (2–0)	**Paige** (0–1)	Bello (3)	100	13–6	13–6
20	April 9	Ohio State	No. 25	Ray Fisher Stadium; Ann Arbor, Michigan	4–7	Gahm (1–0)	**Pace** (2–1)	Brock (7)	250	13–7	13–7
21	April 10	Ohio State	No. 25	Ray Fisher Stadium; Ann Arbor, Michigan	7–0	**Weston** (4–1)	Lonsway (1–4)	—	250	14–7	14–7
22	April 11	Ohio State	No. 25	Ray Fisher Stadium; Ann Arbor, Michigan	16–7	**Denner** (2–0)	Neely (1–1)	—	250	15–7	15–7
23	April 16	at Minnesota	No. 25	Siebert Field; Minneapolis, Minnesota	21–5	**Hajjar** (2–0)	Fredrickson (0–2)	—	100	16–7	16–7
24	April 17	at Minnesota	No. 25	Siebert Field; Minneapolis, Minnesota	4–0	**Weiss** (4–1)	Duffy (0–4)	—	96	17–7	17–7
25	April 18	at Minnesota	No. 25	Siebert Field; Minneapolis, Minnesota	9–5	**Denner** (3–0)	Culliver (0–2)	**Weiss** (2)	87	18–7	18–7
26	April 23	Rutgers	No. 23	Ray Fisher Stadium; Ann Arbor, Michigan	6–4	**Pace** (3–1)	Muller (1–2)	**Weiss** (3)	250	19–7	19–7
27	April 24	Rutgers	No. 23	Ray Fisher Stadium; Ann Arbor, Michigan	2–4	Wereski (5–2)	**Weston** (4–2)	McLain (2)	250	19–8	19–8
28	April 25	Rutgers	No. 23	Ray Fisher Stadium; Ann Arbor, Michigan	2–3	Teller (2–2)	**Denner** (3–1)	Sinibaldi (1)	250	19–9	19–9
—	April 30	at Northwestern		Rocky Miller Park; Evanston, Illinois	Cancelled due to COVID-19 protocols						

May (8–8)
#	Date	Opponent	Rank	Stadium Site	Score	Win	Loss	Save	Attendance	Overall Record	B1G Record
—	May 1	at Northwestern		Rocky Miller Park; Evanston, Illinois	Cancelled due to COVID-19 protocols						
29	May 1	Illinois		Rocky Miller Park; Evanston, Illinois	4–5 ^{(7)}	Kirschsieper (3–3)	**Weiss** (4–2)	—	80	19–10	19–10
30	May 1	Illinois		Rocky Miller Park; Evanston, Illinois	18–8	**Beers** (1–1)	Lavender (5–1)	—	80	20–10	20–10
31	May 2	Illinois		Rocky Miller Park; Evanston, Illinois	7–13	O'Hara (3–0)	**Denner** (3–2)	—	45	20–11	20–11
32	May 2	Illinois		Rocky Miller Park; Evanston, Illinois	19–4	**Dragani** (3–2)	Lader (0–1)	—	45	21–11	21–11
33	May 7	at Michigan State		Drayton McLane Baseball Stadium; East Lansing, Michigan	5–1	**Hajjar** (3–0)	Eria (3–5)	**Weiss** (4)	300	22–11	22–11
34	May 8	at Michigan State		Drayton McLane Baseball Stadium; East Lansing, Michigan	3–1	**Weston** (5–2)	Bennett (0–1)	—	300	23–11	23–11
35	May 9	at Michigan State		Drayton McLane Baseball Stadium; East Lansing, Michigan	2–10	Benschoter (2–4)	**Denner** (3–3)	—	300	23–12	23–12
36	May 14	No. 21 Indiana		Ray Fisher Stadium; Ann Arbor, Michigan	10–3	**Hajjar** (4–0)	Sommer (5–3)	—	250	24–12	24–12
37	May 15	No. 21 Indiana		Ray Fisher Stadium; Ann Arbor, Michigan	8–13	Brown (5–2)	**Weston** (5–3)	—	250	24–13	24–13
38	May 16	No. 21 Indiana		Ray Fisher Stadium; Ann Arbor, Michigan	6–1	**Denner** (4–3)	Bierman (5–3)	**Proctor** (1)	250	25–13	25–13
39	May 21	Maryland	No. 24	Ray Fisher Stadium; Ann Arbor, Michigan	8–11 ^{(11)}	Ramsey (4–1)	**Proctor** (0–1)	—	250	25–14	25–14
40	May 22	Maryland	No. 24	Ray Fisher Stadium; Ann Arbor, Michigan	14–3	**Weston** (6–3)	Savacool (7–2)	—	250	26–14	26–14
41	May 23	Maryland	No. 24	Ray Fisher Stadium; Ann Arbor, Michigan	3–7	Burke (4–3)	**Denner** (4–4)	—	250	26–15	26–15
42	May 28	at No, 20 Nebraska		Hawks Field; Lincoln, Nebraska	0–1	Povich (6–1)	**Hajjar** (4–1)	Schwellenbach (8)	5,434	26–16	26–16
43	May 29	at No. 20 Nebraska		Hawks Field; Lincoln, Nebraska	2–0	**Weston** (7–3)	Hroch (5–2)	**Weiss** (5)	7,650	27–16	27–16
44	May 29	at No. 20 Nebraska		Hawks Field; Lincoln, Nebraska	3–5	Perry (2–0)	**Dragani** (3–3)	Schwellenbach (9)	7,650	27–17	27–17

Postseason (0–2)

South Bend Regional (0–2)
#	Date	Opponent	Rank	Stadium Site	Score	Win	Loss	Save	Attendance	Overall Record	Regional Record
45	June 4	vs. UConn		Frank Eck Stadium; South Bend, Indiana	1–6	Peterson (8–1)	**Hajjar** (4–2)	—	1,825	27–18	0–1
46	June 5	vs. Central Michigan		Frank Eck Stadium; South Bend, Indiana	2–8	Patty (9–2)	**Weston** (7–4)	—	1,825	27–19	0–2

- Win
- Loss
- Postponement
- Bold: Wolverines team member
- Rankings from D1Baseball.com.
- (#) Tournament seedings in parentheses.

== Rankings ==
Ranking movements Legend: ██ Increase in ranking ██ Decrease in ranking — = Not ranked RV = Received votes т = Tied with team above or below
	Week																		
Poll	Pre	1	2	3	4	5	6	7	8	9	10	11	12	13	14	15	16	17	Final
Coaches'	RV	RV*		RV	24	19	23	23т	24	23	RV	RV	RV	RV	RV	RV			
Baseball America	20	20	21	22	20	19	24	24	24	23	—	—	—	23	—	—			
Collegiate Baseball^	18	18	18	19	13	10	16	17	18	17	22	22	23	23	26	RV			
NCBWA†	34	RV	RV	RV	25	21	23	23	24	22	28	RV	RV	26	RV	RV			
D1Baseball	—	—	—	—	22	18	25	25	25	23	—	—	—	24	—	—			

^ Collegiate Baseball ranked 40 teams in their preseason poll, but only ranked 30 teams weekly during the season.
† NCBWA ranks 30 teams in their preseason poll, but only ranks 25 teams weekly during the season.
* A new poll was not released for this week, so for comparison purposes, the previous week's ranking is inserted in this week's slot.

== Awards and honors ==
All-Big Ten
Player	Selection	Ref.
Ted Burton	First Team	
Steven Hajjar	First Team	
Griffin Mazur	Second Team	
Benjamin Sems	Second Team	
Tito Flores	Second Team	
Cameron Weston	Second Team	
Jimmy Obertop	Third Team	
Willie Weiss	Third Team	

== Major League Baseball draft ==
The following Wolverines were selected in the 2021 Major League Baseball draft:

List of Drafted Players
Name	2021 Class	Pos.	Team	Overall
Steven Hajjar	RS Sophomore	RHP	Minnesota Twins	61st
Benjamin Sems	Fifth year	SS	Colorado Rockies	440th
Blake Beers	Senior	RHP	Oakland Athletics	578th
