= Ohio Valley Conference baseball tournament =

- Conference baseball championship
- Sport: Baseball
- Conference: Ohio Valley Conference
- Number of teams: 8
- Format: Single-elimination (first two rounds); Double-elimination (remainder)
- Played: 1979–present
- Last contest: 2026
- Current champion: Little Rock (2)
- Most championships: Middle Tennessee (9)
- Official website: website

The Ohio Valley Conference baseball tournament is the conference baseball championship of the NCAA Division I Ohio Valley Conference. In the current format, established in 2023, the top eight regular-season finishers of the conference's 10 baseball schools qualify for the tournament. The bottom four seeds play single-elimination games, paired by seeds as 5–8 and 6–7. The winners of those games advance to single-elimination games, with the 3 and 4 seeds respectively playing the lower and higher seeds among the first-round winners. At this point, the top two seeds join, and the tournament becomes double-elimination. The most recent 2026 edition was held at Mtn. Dew Park in Marion, Illinois. The winner of the tournament receives an automatic berth to the NCAA Division I Baseball Championship.

== Champions ==
=== By year ===
The following is a list of conference champions and sites listed by year.

| Year | Champion | Venue |
|---|---|---|
| 1979 | Murray State | John "Sonny" Allen Field • Morehead, KY |
| 1980 | Western Kentucky | Nick Denes Field • Bowling Green, KY |
| 1981 | Middle Tennessee | Nick Denes Field • Bowling Green, KY |
| 1982 | Middle Tennessee | Nick Denes Field • Bowling Green, KY |
| 1983 | Morehead State | John "Sonny" Allen Field • Morehead, KY |
| 1984 | Eastern Kentucky | Raymond C. Hand Park • Clarksville, TN |
| 1985 | Eastern Kentucky | John "Sonny" Allen Field • Morehead, KY |
| 1986 | Eastern Kentucky | Reese Smith Jr. Field • Murfreesboro, TN |
| 1987 | Middle Tennessee | Turkey Hughes Field • Richmond, KY |
| 1988 | Eastern Kentucky | Bush Stadium at Averitt Express Baseball Complex • Cookeville, TN |
| 1989 | Eastern Kentucky | Turkey Hughes Field • Richmond, KY |
| 1990 | Middle Tennessee | Reese Smith Jr. Field • Murfreesboro, TN |
| 1991 | Middle Tennessee | Johnny Reagan Field • Murray, KY |
| 1992 | Middle Tennessee | Reese Smith Jr. Field • Murfreesboro, TN |
| 1993 | Morehead State | Reese Smith Jr. Field • Murfreesboro, TN |
| 1994 | Middle Tennessee | Raymond C. Hand Park • Clarksville, TN |
| 1995 | Middle Tennessee | Reese Smith Jr. Field • Murfreesboro, TN |
| 1996 | Austin Peay | Raymond C. Hand Park • Clarksville, TN |
| 1997 | Tennessee Tech | Reese Smith Jr. Field • Murfreesboro, TN |
| 1998 | Southeast Missouri | Capaha Field • Cape Girardeau, MO |
| 1999 | Eastern Illinois | Capaha Field • Cape Girardeau, MO |
| 2000 | Middle Tennessee | Capaha Field • Cape Girardeau, MO |
| 2001 | Tennessee Tech | Brooks Stadium • Paducah, KY |
| 2002 | Southeast Missouri | Brooks Stadium • Paducah, KY |
| 2003 | Murray State | Brooks Stadium • Paducah, KY |
| 2004 | Jacksonville State | Brooks Stadium • Paducah, KY |
| 2005 | Austin Peay | Brooks Stadium • Paducah, KY |
| 2006 | Jacksonville State | Brooks Stadium • Paducah, KY |
| 2007 | Austin Peay | Brooks Stadium • Paducah, KY |
| 2008 | Eastern Illinois | Brooks Stadium • Paducah, KY |
| 2009 | Tennessee Tech | Brooks Stadium • Paducah, KY |
| 2010 | Jacksonville State | Pringles Park • Jackson, TN |
| 2011 | Austin Peay | Pringles Park • Jackson, TN |
| 2012 | Austin Peay | Pringles Park • Jackson, TN |
| 2013 | Austin Peay | The Ballpark at Jackson • Jackson, TN |
| 2014 | Jacksonville State | The Ballpark at Jackson • Jackson, TN |
| 2015 | Morehead State | The Ballpark at Jackson • Jackson, TN |
| 2016 | Southeast Missouri | The Ballpark at Jackson • Jackson, TN |
| 2017 | Tennessee Tech | Choccolocco Park • Oxford, AL |
| 2018 | Morehead State | Choccolocco Park • Oxford, AL |
| 2019 | Jacksonville State | Rent One Park • Marion, IL |
| 2020 | Canceled due to COVID-19 | |
| 2021 | Southeast Missouri | The Ballpark at Jackson • Jackson, TN |
| 2022 | Southeast Missouri | Wild Health Field • Lexington, KY |
| 2023 | Eastern Illinois | Mtn. Dew Park • Marion, IL |
| 2024 | Southeast Missouri | Mtn. Dew Park • Marion, IL |
| 2025 | Little Rock | Mtn. Dew Park • Marion, IL |
| 2026 | Little Rock | Mtn. Dew Park • Marion, IL |

=== By school ===
The following is a list of conference champions listed by school.

| Program | Championships | Years |
|---|---|---|
| Middle Tennessee | 9 | 1981, 1982, 1987, 1990, 1991, 1992, 1994, 1995, 2000 |
| Austin Peay | 6 | 1996, 2005, 2007, 2011, 2012, 2013 |
| Southeast Missouri | 6 | 1998, 2002, 2016, 2021, 2022, 2024 |
| Eastern Kentucky | 5 | 1984, 1985, 1986, 1988, 1989 |
| Jacksonville State | 5 | 2004, 2006, 2010, 2014, 2019 |
| Morehead State | 4 | 1983, 1993, 2015, 2018 |
| Tennessee Tech | 4 | 1997, 2001, 2009, 2017 |
| Eastern Illinois | 3 | 1999, 2008, 2023 |
| Little Rock | 2 | 2025, 2026 |
| Murray State | 2 | 1979, 2003 |
| Western Kentucky | 1 | 1980 |

- Italics indicate that the program no longer fields a baseball team in the OVC, as of the next college baseball season in 2024.

Among current OVC members, Lindenwood, SIU Edwardsville, Southern Indiana, UT Martin, and Western Illinois have yet to win the championship. However, only SIUE and UT Martin were OVC members before the 2023 season, and Western Illinois played its first OVC season in 2024. Tennessee Tech will depart the conference in July 2026.
