= 2019 UT Martin Skyhawks baseball team =

Baseball team

2019 UT Martin Skyhawks baseball
- Conference: Ohio Valley Conference
- West Division
- Record: 25–31 (12–18 OVC)
- Head coach: Ryan Jenkins (2nd season)
- Assistant coaches: Matt Heath (1st season); Hunter Morris (1st season)
- Home stadium: Skyhawk Park

2019 Ohio Valley Conference baseball standings
	Conf.				Overall
Team	W		L	PCT	W		L	PCT
Jacksonville State ‍†‍‡‍^{y}	22	–	8	.733	39	–	23	.629
Morehead State ‍‍‍	19	–	11	.633	40	–	21	.656
Austin Peay ‍‍‍	19	–	11	.633	32	–	25	.561
Belmont ‍‍‍	18	–	12	.600	27	–	30	.474
Eastern Kentucky ‍‍‍	16	–	14	.533	32	–	27	.542
Murray State ‍‍‍	16	–	14	.533	24	–	30	.444
Eastern Illinois ‍‍‍	13	–	17	.433	26	–	30	.464
UT Martin ‍‍‍	12	–	18	.400	25	–	31	.446
SIU Edwardsville ‍‍‍	11	–	19	.367	19	–	32	.373
Southeast Missouri State ‍‍‍	10	–	20	.333	23	–	32	.418
Tennessee Tech ‍‍‍	9	–	21	.300	22	–	32	.407
† – Conference champion ‡ – Tournament champion y – Invited to the NCAA tournament As of June 4, 2019; Rankings from D1Baseball

The 2019 UT Martin Skyhawks baseball team represented the University of Tennessee at Martin during the 2019 NCAA Division I baseball season. The Skyhawks, led by Second-year head coach Ryan Jenkins, played their home games at Skyhawk Park as members of the Ohio Valley Conference.

== Schedule and results ==
2019 UT Martin Skyhawks baseball season game log
Regular season

February
Date	Time	Opponent	Site/stadium	Score	Attendance	Overall record	OVC Record
Feb 15	4:00 PM	vs South Dakota State*	Tech Field • Russellville, AR	L, 3-15		0-1	
Feb 16	1:00 PM	vs South Dakota State*	Tech Field • Russellville, AR	W, 5-4		1-1	
Feb 17	12:00 PM	vs South Dakota State*	Tech Field • Russellville, AR	L, 1-7		1-2	
Feb 23	3:00 PM	at North Alabama*	Mike D. Lane Field • Florence, AL	W, 1-0		2-2	
Feb 24	12:00 PM	at North Alabama*	Mike D. Lane Field • Florence, AL	W, 1-0		3-2	
Feb 24	3:30 PM	at North Alabama*	Mike D. Lane Field • Florence, AL	L, 6-7		3-3	
Feb 26	4:00 PM	at Ole Miss*	Swayze Field • Oxford, MS	L, 6-12		3-4	

March
Date	Time	Opponent	Site/stadium	Score	Attendance	Overall record	OVC Record
Mar 1	3:00 PM	at Kennesaw State*	Stillwell Baseball Stadium • Kennesaw, GA	L, 1-3		3-5	
Mar 2	12:00 PM	at Kennesaw State*	Stillwell Baseball Stadium • Kennesaw, GA	L, 1-2		3-6	
Mar 3	3:00 PM	at Kennesaw State*	Stillwell Baseball Stadium • Kennesaw, GA	W, 6-4		4-6	
Mar 5	4:00 PM	at Auburn*	Plainsman Park • Auburn, AL	L, 9-15		4-7	
Mar 6	4:00 PM	at Auburn*	Plainsman Park • Auburn, AL	L, 0-2		4-8	
Mar 8	1:00 PM	at Southeast Missouri State*	Capaha Field • Cape Girardeau, MO	L, 1-4		4-9	0-1
Mar 10	11:00 AM	at Southeast Missouri State*	Capaha Field • Cape Girardeau, MO	W, 3-0		5-9	1-1
Mar 10	2:00 PM	at Southeast Missouri State*	Capaha Field • Cape Girardeau, MO	W, 1-0		6-9	2-1
Mar 12	3:00 PM	at Alabama A&M*	Bulldog Field • Huntsville, AL	W, 12-3		7-9	
Mar 15	4:00 PM	Belmont	Skyhawk Park • Martin, TN	L, 1-11		7-10	2-2
Mar 16	2:00 PM	Belmont	Skyhawk Park • Martin, TN	L, 2-5 (10)		7-11	2-3
Mar 17	1:00 PM	Belmont	Skyhawk Park • Martin, TN	L, 5-6		7-12	2-4
Mar 19	6:00 PM	Alabama A&M*	Skyhawk Park • Martin, TN	W, 8-3		8-12	
Mar 22	3:00 PM	at Eastern Kentucky	Turkey Hughes Field • Richmond, KY	L, 6-21		8-13	2-5
Mar 23	1:00 PM	at Eastern Kentucky	Turkey Hughes Field • Richmond, KY	L, 4-14		8-14	2-6
Mar 24	11:00 AM	at Eastern Kentucky	Turkey Hughes Field • Richmond, KY	L, 5-8		8-15	2-7
Mar 27	6:00 PM	Union (TN)*	Skyhawk Park • Martin, TN	W, 8-3		9-15	
Mar 29	6:00 PM	Morehead State	Skyhawk Park • Martin, TN	W, 5-4		10-15	3-7
Mar 31	11:00 AM	Morehead State	Skyhawk Park • Martin, TN	L, 2-6		11-16	3-8
Mar 31	2:30 PM	Morehead State	Skyhawk Park • Martin, TN	W, 2-0		12-16	4-8

April
Date	Time	Opponent	Site/stadium	Score	Attendance	Overall record	OVC Record
Apr 3	6:00 PM	at Evansville*	Charles H. Braun Stadium • Evansville, IN	L, 3-6		12-17	
Apr 5	6:00 PM	at Samford*	Joe Lee Griffin Field • Homewood, AL	L, 4-14		12-18	
Apr 6	2:00 PM	at Samford*	Joe Lee Griffin Field • Homewood, AL	L, 3-6		12-19	
Apr 7	1:00 PM	at Samford*	Joe Lee Griffin Field • Homewood, AL	W, 3-1		13-19	
Apr 10	6:00 PM	Christian Brothers*	Skyhawk Park • Martin, TN	W, 18-2		14-19	
Apr 12	6:00 PM	at SIU Edwardsville	Roy E. Lee Field at Simmons Baseball Complex • Edwardsville, IL	L, 5-8		13-20	4-9
Apr 13	12:00 PM	at SIU Edwardsville	Roy E. Lee Field at Simmons Baseball Complex • Edwardsville, IL	L, 2-3		13-21	4-10
Apr 14	3:30 PM	at SIU Edwardsville	Roy E. Lee Field at Simmons Baseball Complex • Edwardsville, IL	L, 0-6		13-22	4-11
Apr 17	6:00 PM	at Union (TN)*	Fesmire Baseball Field • Jackson, TN	W, 7-2		14-22	
Apr 18	1:00 PM	Austin Peay	Skyhawk Park • Martin, TN	W, 6-3		15-22	5-11
Apr 19	4:30 PM	Austin Peay	Skyhawk Park • Martin, TN	L, 4-5		15-23	5-12
Apr 20	1:00 PM	Austin Peay	Skyhawk Park • Martin, TN	L, 11-22		15-24	5-13
Apr 24	6:00 PM	Evansville*	Skyhawk Park • Martin, TN	W, 8-4		16-24	
Apr 26	12:00 PM	at Eastern Illinois	Coaches Stadium at Monier Field • Charleston, IL	W, 9-4		17-24	6-13
Apr 26	3:00 PM	at Eastern Illinois	Coaches Stadium at Monier Field • Charleston, IL	L, 5-16		17-25	6-14
Apr 28	1:00 PM	at Eastern Illinois	Coaches Stadium at Monier Field • Charleston, IL	W, 4-1		18-25	7-14
Apr 30	6:00 PM	at Lipscomb*	Dugan Field • Nashville, TN	W, 7-3		19-25	

May
Date	Time	Opponent	Site/stadium	Score	Attendance	Overall record	OVC Record
May 4	4:00 PM	Jacksonville State	Skyhawk Park • Martin, TN	L, 2-4		19-26	7-15
May 5	3:00 PM	Jacksonville State	Skyhawk Park • Martin, TN	W, 4-2		20-26	8-15
May 6	1:00 PM	Jacksonville State	Skyhawk Park • Martin, TN	L, 2-20		20-27	8-16
May 10	2:00 PM	at Murray State	Reagan Field • Murray, KY	L, 2-5		20-28	8-17
May 10	5:30 PM	at Murray State	Reagan Field • Murray, KY	W, 2-1		21-28	9-17
May 12	1:00 PM	at Murray State	Reagan Field • Murray, KY	L, 5-8		21-29	9-18
May 14	6:00 PM	Memphis*	USA Stadium • Millington, TN	" Canceled "			
May 16	6:00 PM	Tennessee Tech	Skyhawk Park • Martin, TN	W, 6-2		22-29	10-18
May 17	4:00 PM	Tennessee Tech	Skyhawk Park • Martin, TN	W, 7-5		23-29	11-18
May 18	1:00 PM	Tennessee Tech	Skyhawk Park • Martin, TN	W, 8-1		24-29	12-18
May 21	6:00 PM	vs. #7 Eastern Illinois	Rent One Park • Marion, Illinois	W, 2-1		25-29	
May 22	4:00 PM	vs. #2 Austin Peay	Rent One Park • Marion, Illinois	L, 2-12		25-30	
May 22	8:00 PM	vs. #4 Murray State	Rent One Park • Marion, Illinois	L, 4-9		25-31	
