= 2021 Ohio Valley Conference baseball tournament =

College baseball tournament

- Teams: 4
- Format: Double-elimination
- Finals site: The Ballpark at Jackson; Jackson, Tennessee
- Champions: Southeast Missouri State (3rd title)
- Winning coach: Andy Sawyers (1st title)
- MVP: Wade Stauss (Southeast Missouri State)
- Television: ESPN+

2021 Ohio Valley Conference baseball standings
	Conf.				Overall
Team	W		L	PCT	W		L	PCT
Southeast Missouri State ‍‍‡‍^{y}	17	–	10	.630	30	–	22	.577
Murray State ‍‍‍	18	–	12	.600	33	–	25	.569
Morehead State ‍‍‍	13	–	11	.542	24	–	23	.511
Jacksonville State ‍‍‍	16	–	14	.533	26	–	27	.491
Austin Peay ‍‍‍	16	–	14	.533	23	–	33	.411
Tennessee Tech ‍‍‍	15	–	15	.500	22	–	25	.468
Eastern Illinois ‍‍‍	14	–	16	.467	25	–	23	.521
Belmont ‍‍‍	14	–	16	.467	22	–	30	.423
SIU Edwardsville ‍‍‍	13	–	17	.433	23	–	27	.460
Eastern Kentucky ‍‍‍	13	–	17	.433	21	–	32	.396
UT Martin ‍‍‍	10	–	17	.370	19	–	29	.396
‡ – Tournament champion y – Invited to the NCAA tournament As of June 6, 2021; Rankings from D1Baseball

The 2021 Ohio Valley Conference baseball tournament was held from May 27 through 29 at The Ballpark at Jackson, a neutral venue in Jackson, Tennessee. The annual tournament determines the tournament champion of Division I Ohio Valley Conference in college baseball. The tournament champion then earned the conference's automatic bid to the 2021 NCAA Division I baseball tournament.

== Tournament ==
=== Bracket ===
Thursday, May 27
1	Southeast Missouri	11
4	Austin Peay	8
Winner's bracket
2	Murray State	8^{13}
3	Morehead State	7
4	Austin Peay	3
3	Morehead State	1
Loser's bracket

Friday, May 28
1	Southeast Missouri	6
2	Murray State	5
4	Austin Peay	6
2	Murray State	7^{11}

Saturday, May 29
1	Southeast Missouri	1	10
2	Murray State	10	1
