= 2024 North Alabama Lions baseball team =

Intercollegiate baseball season

2024 North Alabama Lions baseball
- Conference: Atlantic Sun Conference
- Record: 17–31 (9–17 ASUN)
- Head coach: Jad Prachniak (2nd season)
- Assistant coaches: Chris Blakey (3rd season); Nick Patton (2nd season); David Mervis (2nd season)
- Home stadium: Mike D. Lane Field

2024 ASUN Conference baseball standings
	Conf.						Overall
Team	W		L		T	PCT	W		L		T	PCT
Austin Peay ‍†‍‍	20	–	10	–	0	.667	36	–	21	–	0	.632
Stetson ‍†‍‡‍^{y}	20	–	10	–	0	.667	40	–	20	–	0	.667
Florida Gulf Coast ‍†‍‍	20	–	10	–	0	.667	30	–	26	–	0	.536
Kennesaw State ‍‍‍	19	–	10	–	0	.655	32	–	24	–	0	.571
Jacksonville ‍‍‍	18	–	12	–	0	.600	27	–	31	–	0	.466
Lipscomb ‍‍‍	15	–	15	–	0	.500	22	–	34	–	0	.393
Eastern Kentucky ‍‍‍	14	–	16	–	0	.467	20	–	37	–	0	.351
Central Arkansas ‍‍‍	12	–	18	–	0	.400	26	–	30	–	0	.464
North Florida ‍‍‍	11	–	17	–	1	.397	21	–	30	–	1	.413
North Alabama ‍‍‍	10	–	19	–	1	.350	18	–	35	–	1	.343
Queens* ‍‍‍	10	–	20	–	0	.333	14	–	41	–	0	.255
Bellarmine* ‍‍‍	9	–	21	–	0	.300	10	–	45	–	0	.182
† – Conference champion ‡ – Tournament champion y – Invited to the NCAA tournament * Ineligible for the 2024 NCAA tournament due to transition from Division II; As of May 26, 2024; Rankings from D1Baseball

The 2024 North Alabama Lions baseball team represented the University of North Alabama during the 2024 NCAA Division I baseball season. They were led by head coach Jad Prachniak, in his 2nd season at UNA. The Lions played their home games at Mike D. Lane Field as a members of the Atlantic Sun Conference.

This was the Lions' last season at Mike D. Lane Field as it was demolished to make room for their new stadium, Bank Independent Stadium.

== Previous season ==
The 2023 team finished the season with a 14–37 record and a 8–22 record in ASUN play. They finished 13th in conference standings after a tiebreaker put UNA ahead of Bellarmine.

== Preseason ==
=== Preseason ASUN honors ===
First baseman Kyle Machado was selected to the Preseason All-ASUN Team. He was the only North Alabama player selected to the fourteen person team.

Preseason All-ASUN Team
Player	No.	Position	Class
Kyle Machado	5	1B	Graduate Student

=== Coaches poll ===
The ASUN baseball coaches' poll was released on February 8, 2024.

ASUN Preseason Coaches' Poll
Predicted finish	Team	Points
1	Lipscomb	137 (7)
2	FGCU	123 (2)
3	Jacksonville	115 (1)
4	Stetson	103
5	Kennesaw State	99 (1)
6	Austin Peay	84 (1)
7	EKU	77
8	Central Arkansas	65
9	North Florida	56
10	Queens	30
11	North Alabama	25
12	Bellarmine	22

== Personnel ==
2024 North Alabama Lions roster
Pitchers: 7 – Carson Howard – Junior; 10 – Jacob James – Senior; 11 – Quinn Petty – Junior; 15 – Jacob Bradshaw – Senior; 18 – Avery Brown – Sophomore; 19 – Dane Sykes – Senior; 21 – Justus Agosto – (redshirt) Sophomore; 22 – Brycen Parrish – (redshirt) Junior; 23 – Evan Kingma – Senior; 24 – Kevin Henrich – Sophomore; 25 – Bryce Richter – Graduate; 27 – Anthony Pingeton – Junior; 29 – Justin Battle – Sophomore; 31 – Raleigh Claunch – (redshirt) Sophomore; 33 – Josh Bowerman - Sophomore; 45 – Josh Allen Stogner – Junior; 48 – David Burton – Junior; 51 – Caleb Menina – Sophomore	Catchers: 12 – Levi Jensen – Senior; 14 – Andrew Knight – Graduate; 28 – Andin Johnson – (redshirt) Junior; 40 – Charlie Cochran – Sophomore; Infielders: 2 – Leighton Jenkins – Junior; 4 – Gehrig Frei – (redshirt) Sophomore; 5 – Kyle Machado – Graduate; 9 – Jackson Ferrigno – (redshirt) Sophomore; 17 – Cal Cook – Senior; 30 – Zak Majer – Senior; 34 – Bryant Loving – Freshman; 36 – Braden Ebeling – Freshman; 37 – Ryan West – Junior; 44 – Brady Moore – (redshirt) Junior	Outfielders: 3 – Brant Brown – (redshirt) Junior; 8 – Jonathan Lane – Junior; 13 – Dominick McIntyre – Senior; 16 – Ethan Walker – Sophomore; 20 – Jackson Cheek – Sophomore; 35 – Alex Wilson – Junior

=== Coaching staff ===
Name	Position	Seasons at North Alabama	Alma mater
Jad Prachniak	Head coach	2	University of Rhode Island (2005)
Chris Blakey	Associate Head Coach	3	University of North Alabama (2018)
Nick Patten	Assistant Baseball Coach / Hitting Coach	2	University of Delaware (2021)
David Mervis	Assistant Baseball Coach / Pitching Coach	2	University of Delaware (2021)

== Schedule and results ==
Legend
	North Alabama win
	North Alabama loss
	Postponement/Cancellation/Suspensions
**Bold**	North Alabama team member

2024 North Alabama Lions baseball game log
Regular season

February
Date	Opponent	Rank	Site/stadium	Score	Win	Loss	Save	TV	Attendance	Overall record	ASUN record
February 16	at South Alabama		Eddie Stanky Field; Mobile, AL	**L** 2–3	Gant Starling	**Brycen Parrish**	N/A	ESPN+	1,214	0–1	0–0
February 17	Southern Indiana		Eddie Stanky Field	**W** 13–7	**Carson Howard**	Gavin Wilson	N/A	ESPN+	654	1–1	0–0
February 18	Lamar		Eddie Stanky Field	**L** 1–9	Hunter Hesseltine	**Kevin Henrich**	N/A	ESPN+	856	1–2	0–0
February 20	Belmont		Mike D. Lane Field	**L** 2-6	Joe Ruzicka	**Caleb Menina**	N/A	ESPN+	152	1-3	0-0
February 23	Morehead State		Mike D. Lane Field	**L** 2–5	Luke Helton	**Jacob Bradshaw**	N/A	ESPN+	203	1-4	0-0
February 24	Morehead State		Mike D. Lane Field	**W** 9–6	**Jacob James**	Grant Herron	**Dane Sykes**	ESPN+	215	2-4	0-0
February 25	Morehead State		Mike D. Lane Field	**L** 9–13	Will Grimmett	**Justus Agosto**	N/A	ESPN+	265	2-5	0-0
February 27	at Murray State		Roy Stewart Stadium	**L** 1-8	Ethan Lyke	**Dane Sykes**	N/A	ESPN+	137	2-6	0-0

March
Date	Opponent	Rank	Site/stadium	Score	Win	Loss	Save	TV	Attendance	Overall record	ASUN record
March 2	UAB		Mike D. Lane Field	**W** 9–8	**Anthony Pingeton**	Braxton Brooks	N/A	ESPN+	272	3–6	0–0
March 2	UAB		Mike D. Lane Field	**L** 8–10	Brooks House	**Justin Battle**	Christian Clack	ESPN+	317	3–7	0–0
March 3	UAB		Mike D. Lane Field	**L** 3–8	Colin Daniels	**Kevin Henrich**	N/A	ESPN+	252	3–8	0–0
March 7	Murray State		Mike D. Lane Field	**L** 6–11	Ethan Lyke	**John Allen Stogner**	N/A	ESPN+	207	3–9	0–0
March 9	UT Martin		Mike D. Lane Field	**W** 10–0^{7}	**Jacob James**	Tristan Walton	N/A	ESPN+	232	4–9	0–0
March 10	UT Martin		Mike D. Lane Field	**W** 3–1^{7}	**Jacob Bradshaw**	Eric Steensma	**Brycen Parrish**	ESPN+	191	5–9	0–0
March 10	UT Martin		Mike D. Lane Field	**W** 5–2	**Anthony Pingeton**	Choyce Diffey	**Caleb Menina**	ESPN+	225	6–9	0–0
March 12	at Memphis		FedExPark	**L** 2–16^{7}	Cade Davis	**John Allen Stogner**	N/A	ESPN+	597	6–10	0–0
March 16	Kennesaw State		Toyota Field	**L** 5–10	Nolan Silver	**Brycen Parrish**	N/A		422	6–11	0–1
March 16	Kennesaw State		Toyota Field	**L** 1–11^{7}	Blake Aita	**Jacob Bradshaw**	N/A		489	6–12	0–2
March 17	Kennesaw State		Toyota Field	**W** 4–2	**Dane Sykes**	Smith Pinson	N/A		388	7–12	1–2
March 19	at Tennessee Tech		Howell Bush Stadium	**W** 8–4	**John Allen Stogner**	Reece McDuffie	**Carson Howard**	ESPN+	175	8–12	1–2
March 22	at Eastern Kentucky		Turkey Hughes Field	**L** 0–10^{7}	Nathan Lawson	**Jacob James**	N/A	ESPN+	101	8–13	1–3
March 23	at Eastern Kentucky		Turkey Hughes Field	**L** 5–6	Joe Clancy	**Brycen Parrish**	Garrett Langrell	ESPN+	101	8–14	1–4
March 24	at Eastern Kentucky		Turkey Hughes Field	**L** 1–5	Rese Brown	**Anthony Pingeton**	Garrett Langrell	ESPN+	150	8–15	1–5
March 28	Lipscomb		Mike D. Lane Field	**L** 2–8	Alex Brewer	**Jacob James**	N/A	ESPN+	385	8–16	1–6
March 29	Lipscomb		Mike D. Lane Field	**W** 5–3	**Caleb Menina**	Chandler Giles	**Dane Sykes**	ESPN+	114	9–16	2–6
March 30	Lipscomb		Mike D. Lane Field	**L** 2–15^{7}	Jake Poindexter	**Anthony Pingeton**	N/A	ESPN+	141	9–17	2–7

April
Date	Opponent	Rank	Site/stadium	Score	Win	Loss	Save	TV	Attendance	Overall record	ASUN record
April 3	Alabama A&M		Mike D. Lane Field	**W** 13–5	**John Allen Stogner**	Gabe Nicholson	N/A	ESPN+	115	10–17	2–7
April 5	at Jacksonville		John Sessions Stadium	**W** 9–1	**Jacob James**	Pe Prescott	N/A		371	11–17	3–7
April 6	at Jacksonville		John Sessions Stadium	**L** 2–9	Logan Jones	**Dane Sykes**	N/A		388	11–18	3–8
April 7	at Jacksonville		John Sessions Stadium	**L** 4–5^{10}	Is Williams	**Brycen Parrish**	N/A	ESPN+	302	11–19	3–9
April 13	at Bellarmine		Knights Field	**W** 15–2^{7}	**Jacob James**	Sam Matherly	N/A	ESPN+	125	12–9	4–9
April 13	at Bellarmine		Knights Field	**L** 11–12	Nolan Pender	**Caleb Menina**	N/A	ESPN+	125	12–10	4–10
April 14	at Bellarmine		Knights Field	**W** 22–3^{7}	**Anthony Pingeton**	Thomas Sylvester	N/A	ESPN+	125	13–10	5–10
April 16	at Belmont		E. S. Rose Park	**L** 9–15	Caleb Guisewite	**John Allen Stogner**	N/A	ESPN+	123	13–11	5–10
April 19	Stetson		Mike D. Lane Field	**L** 4–8	Anthony DeFabbia	**Jacob James**	Zane Coppersmith		368	13–12	5–11
April 20	Stetson		Mike D. Lane Field	**W** 5–4	**Jacob Bradshaw**	Aric McAtee	**Dane Sykes**		274	14–12	6–11
April 21	Stetson		Mike D. Lane Field	**L** 1–4	Daniel Paret	**Anthony Pingeton**	Cole Stallings		372	14–13	6–12
April 23	at Ole Miss		Swayze Field	**L** 4–9	Grayson Saunier	**John Allen Stogner**	N/A	SECN+	12,996	14–14	6–12
April 26	Central Arkansas		Mike D. Lane Field	**L** 4–9	Jess Barker	**Jacob James**	H. Alexander	ESPN+	364	14–15	6–13
April 27	Central Arkansas		Mike D. Lane Field	**L** 4–14^{8}	P. Christensen	**Jacob Bradshaw**	N/A	ESPN+	385	14–16	6–14
April 28	Central Arkansas		Mike D. Lane Field	**L** 3–6	Cole Macrae	**Anthony Pingeton**	H. Alexander	ESPN+	393	14–17	6–15
April 30	at Middle Tennessee		Reese Smith Jr. Field	**L** 2–9	Dylan Alonso	**John Allen Stogner**	Justin Lee	ESPN+	796	14–18	6–15

May
Date	Opponent	Rank	Site/stadium	Score	Win	Loss	Save	TV	Attendance	Overall record	ASUN record
May 1	Samford		Mike D. Lane Field	**L** 10–19	Cole Fryman	**Justin Battle**	N/A	ESPN+	224	14–19	6–15
May 3	at Queens		Stick Williams Dream Baseball Field	**W** 11-7	**Jacob James**	Landry Jurecka	**Brycen Parrish**	ESPN+	75	15–29	7–15
May 3	at Queens		Stick Williams Dream Baseball Field	**W** 8–2	**Dane Sykes**	Carson Magill	N/A	ESPN+	80	16–29	8–15
May 5	at Queens		Stick Williams Dream Baseball Field	**L** 8–13	Johnny Joseph	**Anthony Pingeton**	Isaiah Bennett	ESPN+	72	16–30	8–16
May 7	at Samford		Joe Lee Griffin Stadium	**L** 3–12	Miller Riggins	**John Allen Stogner**	N/A		133	16–31	8–16
May 10	North Florida		Mike D. Lane Field	**L** 4–3	Jordan Wimpelberg	**Jacob James**	Zane Starling		317	16–32	8–17
May 11	North Florida		Mike D. Lane Field	**W** 4–2	**Jacob Bradshaw**	Tony Roca	**Dane Sykes**		741	17–32	9–17
May 12	North Florida		Mike D. Lane Field	**Tie** 4–4^{13}*	N/A	N/A	N/A		367	17–32–1	9–17–1
May 14	at Mississippi State		Dudy Noble Field	**L** 4–8	Cam Schuelke	**Carson Howard**	N/A	SECN+	9,349	17–33–1	9–17–1
May 16	at Austin Peay		Raymond C. Hand Park	**L** 13–2^{7}	Jacob Weaver	**Jacob James**	N/A	ESPN+	783	17–34–1	9–18–1
May 17	at Austin Peay		Raymond C. Hand Park	**L** 3–8	Josh Howitt	**Jacob Bradshaw**	N/A	ESPN+	583	17–35–1	9–19–1
May 18	at Austin Peay		Raymond C. Hand Park	**W** 14–13	**Brycen Parrish**	Deaton Oak	**Jacob James**	ESPN+	606	18–35–1	10–19–1

* The May 12 game against North Florida ended in a tie at the end of the 13th inning as the game reached the travel curfew for the away team

== Records broken ==
Jacob James broke the school's all-time strikeout record in the third to last game of the season against Austin Peay. In the second-inning, James threw career strikeout No. 281 which put him in sole possession of the record. The previous record holder was Chad Boughner, who had 280 career strikeouts at North Alabama. James would finish the season with 284 career strikeouts.

== Postseason honors ==
Two North Alabama Lions were selected for postseason ASUN honors.

Third Team All-ASUN
Player	No.	Position	Class
Gehrig Frei	4	3B	(redshirt) Sophomore
Jacob James	10	P	Senior
