= 2012 Ohio Valley Conference baseball tournament =

- Teams: 6
- Format: Double-elimination
- Finals site: Pringles Park; Jackson, TN
- Champions: Austin Peay (5th title)
- Winning coach: Gary McClure (5th title)
- MVP: Greg Bachman (Austin Peay)

2012 Ohio Valley Conference baseball standings
	Conf.				Overall
Team	W		L	PCT	W		L	PCT
Austin Peay ‍†‍‡‍^{y}	19	–	7	.731	40	–	24	.625
Eastern Kentucky ‍†‍‍	19	–	7	.731	31	–	23	.574
Jacksonville State ‍‍‍	17	–	10	.630	28	–	30	.483
Eastern Illinois ‍‍‍	15	–	11	.577	29	–	29	.500
Morehead State ‍‍‍	13	–	14	.481	28	–	27	.509
SIU Edwardsville ‍‍‍	13	–	14	.481	27	–	28	.491
Southeast Missouri State ‍‍‍	12	–	15	.444	23	–	26	.469
Tennessee Tech ‍‍‍	10	–	16	.385	21	–	32	.396
Murray State ‍‍‍	8	–	19	.296	23	–	33	.411
Tennessee–Martin ‍‍‍	7	–	20	.259	13	–	41	.241
† – Conference champion ‡ – Tournament champion y – Invited to the NCAA tournament As of June 5, 2012; Rankings from Collegiate Baseball

The 2012 Ohio Valley Conference baseball tournament took place from May 23 through 27. The top six regular season finishers met in the double-elimination tournament, which was held at Pringles Park. The Ohio Valley Conference has ten teams, but SIU Edwardsville was not eligible for postseason play. Austin Peay won their fifth Ohio Valley Championship by a score of 3–0 and earned the conference's automatic bid to the 2012 NCAA Division I baseball tournament.

== Seeding and format ==
The top six regular season finishers were seeded by conference winning percentage. Austin Peay claimed the top seed by tiebreaker. SIU Edwardsville was not eligible for postseason play, leaving the sixth seed to Southeast Missouri State.

Team	W	L	PCT	GB	Seed
Austin Peay	19	7	.731	–	1
Eastern Kentucky	19	7	.731	–	2
Jacksonville State	17	10	.621	2.5	3
Eastern Illinois	15	11	.577	4	4
Morehead State	13	14	.481	6.5	5
SIU Edwardsville	13	14	.481	6.5	–
Southeast Missouri State	12	15	.444	7.5	6
Tennessee Tech	10	16	.385	9	–
Murray State	8	19	.296	11.5	–
Tennessee–Martin	7	20	.259	12.5	–

== Results ==
Upper round 1	Upper round 2	Upper final	Final
2	Eastern Kentucky	2
4	Eastern Illinois	2	4	Eastern Illinois	11
5	Morehead State	1	4	Eastern Illinois	7
6	Southeast Missouri State	6
1	Austin Peay	3
3	Jacksonville State	1	6	Southeast Missouri State	4
6	Southeast Missouri State	4
4	Eastern Illinois	0	0
1	Austin Peay	7	3
Lower round 1	Lower round 2	Lower round 3	Lower final
1	Austin Peay	10
1	Austin Peay	7*	6	Southeast Missouri State	6
2	Eastern Kentucky	4	3	Jacksonville State	6*
3	Jacksonville State	12	3	Jacksonville State	9
5	Morehead State	4

* - Indicates game required 11 innings.

== All-Tournament team ==
The following players were named to the All-Tournament team.

Name	School
Sam Eberle	Jacksonville State
Kenton Parmley	Southeast Missouri State
Ryan Dineen	Eastern Illinois
Greg Bachman	Austin Peay
Reed Harper	Austin Peay
Jordan Hankins	Austin Peay
Kyle Bluestein	Jacksonville State
Rolando Gautier	Austin Peay
Ben Thoma	Eastern Illinois
Daniel Watts	Jacksonville State
Mike Hoekstra	Eastern Illinois
Kacy Kemmer	Austin Peay
Zach Toney	Austin Peay

=== Most Valuable Player ===
Greg Bachman of Austin Peay was named Tournament Most Valuable Player.
