= Mike McGuire (baseball) =

American college baseball coach

Current position
- Title: Head coach
- Team: Winthrop
- Conference: Big South
- Record: 64–53

Playing career
- 1989–1990: Akron
- 1991–1992: South Carolina
- 1993–1994: Zanesville Greys
- Position: Catcher

Coaching career (HC unless noted)
- 1995–1996: Morehead State (Asst.)
- 1997–2002: Winthrop (Asst.)
- 2003–2005: Lander
- 2006–2011: Winthrop (Asst.)
- 2012: Louisburg
- 2013–2019: Morehead State
- 2020–2024: USC Upstate
- 2025–present: Winthrop

Head coaching record
- Overall: 541–419–1 (NCAA); 52–9 (NJCAA)
- Tournaments: Ohio Valley: 15–9; Big South: 7–10; NCAA: 0–4

Accomplishments and honors

Championships
- 2x OVC tournament (2015, 2018)

Awards
- Ohio Valley Coach of the Year (2015)

Mike McGuire is an American college baseball coach and former catcher. He is the head baseball coach at Winthrop University. McGuire played college baseball at the University of Akron from 1990 to 1991 and the University of South Carolina from 1992 to 1993 and played semi-professionally in the Frontier League from 1993 to 1994. He served as head coach of the Morehead State Eagles baseball program from 2013 season to 2019.

== Playing career ==
McGuire played two seasons for Akron before completing his eligibility at South Carolina. He then played two professional seasons with the Independent Zanesville Greys of the Frontier League.

== Coaching career ==
McGuire began coaching as an assistant for two seasons at Morehead State. He then moved to Winthrop for six seasons. McGuire earned his first head coaching job at Division II Lander. After three seasons with the Bearcats, he returned to Winthrop as associate head coach. After six seasons, he earned another head coaching position at Louisburg, a junior college in North Carolina. After one season, McGuire was hired as head coach at Morehead State.

On June 18, 2019, McGuire left Morehead State to become the head coach for the USC Upstate Spartans baseball program.

== Head coaching record ==
This table shows McGuire's record as a head coach at the Division I, Division II, and NJCAA level.

Record table
Season	Team	Overall	Conference	Standing	Postseason
Lander Bearcats (Peach Belt Conference) (2003–2005)
2003	Lander	27-29	11-18		
2004	Lander	33-23	12-15		
2005	Lander	30-28	12-19		
Lander:		90-80	35-52		
Louisburg Hurricanes (Region 10 League) (2012–2012)
2012	Louisburg	52-9			
Louisburg:		52-9 NJCAA			
Morehead State Eagles (Ohio Valley Conference) (2013–2019)
2013	Morehead State	16–40	10–20	9th	
2014	Morehead State	29–22	16–14	T-4th	Ohio Valley tournament
2015	Morehead State	38–28	20–10	2nd	NCAA Regional
2016	Morehead State	32–27	17–13	4th	Ohio Valley tournament
2017	Morehead State	36–23	18–11	2nd	Ohio Valley tournament
2018	Morehead State	37–24	19–12	3rd	NCAA Regional
2019	Morehead State	40–21	19–11	T-2nd	Ohio Valley tournament
Morehead State:		228–191	119–91		
USC Upstate Spartans (Big South Conference) (2020–2024)
2020	USC Upstate	13–5	0–0		Season canceled due to COVID-19
2021	USC Upstate	37–16	28–12	2nd	Big South tournament
2022	USC Upstate	35–22–1	17–6–1	2nd	Big South tournament
2023	USC Upstate	38–22	21–6	2nd	Big South tournament
2024	USC Upstate	36–24	16–8	3rd	Big South tournament
USC Upstate:		159–89–1	82–32–1		
Winthrop Eagles (Big South Conference) (2025–present)
2025	Winthrop	31–29	13–11	T–4th	Big South tournament
2026	Winthrop	33–24	15–9	2nd	Big South tournament
Winthrop:		64–53	28–20		
Total:		541–413–1			
National champion Postseason invitational champion Conference regular season champion Conference regular season and conference tournament champion Division regular season champion Division regular season and conference tournament champion Conference tournament champion

== See also ==
- List of current NCAA Division I baseball coaches
