= 2015 Ohio Valley Conference baseball tournament =

- Teams: 6
- Format: Double-elimination
- Finals site: The Ballpark at Jackson; Jackson, TN
- Champions: Morehead State (3rd title)
- Winning coach: Mike McGuire (1st title)

2015 Ohio Valley Conference baseball standings
	Conf.				Overall
Team	W		L	PCT	W		L	PCT
SE Missouri State ‍‍‍	20	–	7	.741	31	–	20	.608
Morehead State ‍‍‍	18	–	9	.667	33	–	19	.635
SIU Edwardsville ‍‍‍	17	–	10	.630	18	–	27	.400
Tennessee Tech ‍‍‍	15	–	12	.556	24	–	25	.490
Belmont ‍‍‍	14	–	12	.538	26	–	25	.510
Austin Peay ‍‍‍	15	–	15	.500	25	–	25	.500
Jacksonville State ‍‍‍	13	–	14	.481	27	–	25	.519
Eastern Kentucky ‍‍‍	10	–	16	.385	19	–	28	.404
Murray State ‍‍‍	10	–	17	.370	15	–	38	.283
Tennessee–Martin ‍‍‍	9	–	18	.333	17	–	32	.347
Eastern Illinois ‍‍‍	8	–	19	.296	12	–	34	.261
‡ – Tournament champion As of May 12, 2015; Rankings from Collegiate Baseball

The 2015 Ohio Valley Conference baseball tournament was from May 20 through 24. The top six regular season finishers will met in the double-elimination tournament, held at The Ballpark at Jackson in Jackson, Tennessee. Morehead State earned the conference's automatic bid to the 2015 NCAA Division I baseball tournament.

== Seeding and format ==
The top six regular season finishers will be seeded by conference winning percentage. Teams will then play a double-elimination tournament, with the top two seeds receiving a single bye.

== Results ==
Upper round 1	Upper round 2	Upper final	Final
1	SE Missouri State	2
4	Tennessee Tech	5	6	Belmont	7
5	Jacksonville State	3	2	Morehead State	8
6	Belmont	4
2	Morehead State	4*
3	SIU Edwardsville	7	4	Tennessee Tech	3
6	Belmont	9*
2	Morehead State	16	–
1	SE Missouri State	3	–
Lower round 1	Lower round 2	Lower round 3	Lower final
1	SE Missouri State	9
1	SE Missouri State	14	6	Belmont	4
5	Jacksonville State	4	4	Tennessee Tech	1
5	Jacksonville State	8	1	SE Missouri State	12
4	SIU Edwardsville	5
