= Travis Janssen =

American baseball player and coach (born 1974)

Biographical details
- Born: July 5, 1974 (age 51); Manhattan, Kansas, U.S.

Playing career
- 1993–1996: Butler C. C.
- 1995–1996: New Mexico State
- 1996: Adirondack Lumberjacks
- Position: Second baseman

Coaching career (HC unless noted)
- 1997: Kansas State (GA)
- 1998: Butler C. C. (asst.)
- 1999–2001: Arkansas (asst.)
- 2002–2003: Northwestern State (asst.)
- 2004–2005: Hawaii (asst.)
- 2006–2011: Jacksonville State (asst.)
- 2012–2015: Northeastern State
- 2016–2022: Austin Peay

Head coaching record
- Overall: 269–272
- Tournaments: OVC: 6–10; NCAA: 0–0

Travis Janssen (born July 5, 1974) is an American college baseball coach and former second baseman who is the head baseball coach at Oxford High School. Janssen played college baseball at New Mexico State from 1995 to 1996, before playing professionally. He then served as the head coach of the Northeastern State (2012–2015) and the Austin Peay Governors (2016–2022).

== Playing career ==
Janssen attended Manhattan High School in Manhattan, Kansas. Janssen was on the second ever Manhattan baseball team, and helped lead the team to a state championship as a senior in 1992. Janssen then committed to Butler Community College, where he was a member of the Butler Grizzles baseball team. After two seasons at Butler, Janssen transferred to New Mexico State University where he continued his baseball career. In 1995, he played collegiate summer baseball with the Falmouth Commodores of the Cape Cod Baseball League.

== Coaching career ==
Janssen served as a graduate assistant with the Kansas State Wildcats baseball program in 1997. In 1998, he moved on to Butler where he spent a season. In 1999, he joined the Arkansas Razorbacks baseball team as an assistant.

On June 29, 2011, Janssen was named the head coach of the Northeastern State University baseball team.

On September 16, 2015, Janssen was named the head coach of the Austin Peay Governors baseball program. On April 25, 2022, Janssen was relieved of his duties as head coach of the Governors.

== Head coaching record ==
Statistics overview
| Season | Team | Overall | Conference | Standing | Postseason |
|---|---|---|---|---|---|
Northeastern State RiverHawks (Independent) (2012)
| 2012 | Northeastern State | 25–24 | 0–0 | | |
Northeastern State RiverHawks (Mid-America Intercollegiate Athletics Association) (2013–2015)
| 2013 | Northeastern State | 28–23 | 25–20 | 6th | MIAA Tournament |
| 2014 | Northeastern State | 26–28 | 20–20 | 8th | MIAA Tournament |
| 2015 | Northeastern State | 25–24 | 17–19 | 8th | |
| Northeastern State: | | 104–99 | 47–33 | | |
Austin Peay Governors (Ohio Valley Conference) (2016–2022)
| 2016 | Austin Peay | 30–23 | 17–9 | 3rd | Ohio Valley Tournament |
| 2017 | Austin Peay | 28–30 | 13–16 | 7th | Ohio Valley Tournament |
| 2018 | Austin Peay | 30–27 | 17–13 | 5th | Ohio Valley Tournament |
| 2019 | Austin Peay | 32–25 | 19–11 | T-2nd | Ohio Valley Tournament |
| 2020 | Austin Peay | 7–10 | 1–2 | | Season canceled due to COVID-19 |
| 2021 | Austin Peay | 23–33 | 16–14 | T-4th | Ohio Valley Tournament |
| 2022 | Austin Peay | 15–25 | 7–8 | | |
| Austin Peay: | | 165–173 | 90–68 | | |
| Total: | | 269–272 | | | |
National champion Postseason invitational champion Conference regular season champion Conference regular season and conference tournament champion Division regular season champion Division regular season and conference tournament champion Conference tournament champion
