= 2019 Ohio Valley Conference baseball tournament =

American college baseball championship

- Teams: 8
- Format: Double-elimination
- Finals site: Rent One Park; Marion, Illinois
- Champions: Jacksonville State (5th title)
- Winning coach: Jim Case (5th title)
- Television: ESPN+

2019 Ohio Valley Conference baseball standings
	Conf.				Overall
Team	W		L	PCT	W		L	PCT
Jacksonville State ‍†‍‡‍^{y}	22	–	8	.733	39	–	23	.629
Morehead State ‍‍‍	19	–	11	.633	40	–	21	.656
Austin Peay ‍‍‍	19	–	11	.633	32	–	25	.561
Belmont ‍‍‍	18	–	12	.600	27	–	30	.474
Eastern Kentucky ‍‍‍	16	–	14	.533	32	–	27	.542
Murray State ‍‍‍	16	–	14	.533	24	–	30	.444
Eastern Illinois ‍‍‍	13	–	17	.433	26	–	30	.464
UT Martin ‍‍‍	12	–	18	.400	25	–	31	.446
SIU Edwardsville ‍‍‍	11	–	19	.367	19	–	32	.373
Southeast Missouri State ‍‍‍	10	–	20	.333	23	–	32	.418
Tennessee Tech ‍‍‍	9	–	21	.300	22	–	32	.407
† – Conference champion ‡ – Tournament champion y – Invited to the NCAA tournament As of June 4, 2019; Rankings from D1Baseball

The 2019 Ohio Valley Conference baseball tournament was held from May 21 through 26. The top eight regular season finishers met in the double-elimination tournament, held at Rent One Park in Marion, Illinois. The tournament champion, Jacksonville State, earned the conference's automatic bid to the 2019 NCAA Division I baseball tournament Among current members, Austin Peay has won the most championships, with six, while Belmont (joined in 2012), SIU Edwardsville (joined in 2008), and Tennessee–Martin (joined in 1992) have never won championships. The tournament began in 1979.

== Seeding and format ==
The top eight regular season finishers were seeded by conference winning percentage. After a play-in round between the bottom two seeds, the remaining seven teams played a double-elimination tournament, with the top seed receiving a single bye.

== Results ==
Play in round

Team	R
#8 UT Martin	2
#7 Eastern Illinois	1

Upper round 1	Upper round 2	Upper final	Final
1	Jacksonville State	6^{10}
4	Belmont	5
4	Belmont	8
5	Murray State	1
1	Jacksonville State	8
2	Austin Peay	4
2	Austin Peay	12
8	UT Martin	2
2	Austin Peay	9
6	Eastern Kentucky	7
3	Morehead State	1
6	Eastern Kentucky	4
1	Jacksonville State	10	–
3	Morehead State	3	–
Lower round 1	Lower round 2	Lower round 3	Lower final
3	Morehead State	2
8	UT Martin	4	5	Murray State	1	3	Morehead State	9
5	Murray State	9	3	Morehead State	11	2	Austin Peay	4
6	Eastern Kentucky	3
4	Belmont	8
6	Eastern Kentucky	15

== Conference championship ==
Ohio Valley Championship
(3) Morehead State Eagles	vs.	(1) Jacksonville State Gamecocks

May 25, 2019, 3:00 p.m. (CDT) at Rent One Park in Marion, Illinois
Team	1	2	3	4	5	6	7	8	9	R	H	E
(3) Morehead State	0	0	0	1	0	0	1	0	0	3	10	4
(1) Jacksonville State	0	0	0	4	2	2	2	0	X	10	10	0
WP: Dylan Hathcock (3–0) LP: David Looney (3–1) Sv: None; Attendance: 422
