= 2016 Ohio Valley Conference baseball tournament =

- Teams: 6
- Format: Double-elimination
- Finals site: The Ballpark at Jackson; Jackson, TN
- Champions: Southeast Missouri State (3rd title)
- Winning coach: Steve Bieser (1st title)
- MVP: Joey Lucchesi (Southeast Missouri State)

2016 Ohio Valley Conference baseball standings
	Conf.				Overall
Team	W		L	PCT	W		L	PCT
Southeast Missouri State †‡^{y} ‍‍‍	22	–	8	.733	36	–	18	.667
Austin Peay ‍‍‍	21	–	9	.700	34	–	22	.607
Jacksonville State ‍‍‍	20	–	10	.667	33	–	22	.600
Morehead State ‍‍‍	17	–	13	.567	32	–	27	.542
Belmont ‍‍‍	17	–	13	.567	33	–	27	.550
Tennessee Tech ‍‍‍	17	–	13	.567	31	–	24	.564
Murray State ‍‍‍	15	–	15	.500	27	–	29	.482
Eastern Kentucky ‍‍‍	13	–	17	.433	24	–	31	.436
Tennessee–Martin ‍‍‍	9	–	21	.300	19	–	35	.352
Eastern Illinois ‍‍‍	8	–	22	.267	15	–	39	.278
SIU Edwardsvills ‍‍‍	6	–	24	.200	9	–	40	.184
† – Conference champion ‡ – Tournament champion y – Invited to the NCAA tournament As of June 11, 2016; Rankings from Collegiate Baseball

The 2016 Ohio Valley Conference baseball tournament was held from May 25 through 29. The top six regular season finishers met in the double-elimination tournament, held at Pringles Park in Jackson, Tennessee. The tournament champion earned the conference's automatic bid to the 2016 NCAA Division I baseball tournament Among current members, Austin Peay has won the most championships, with six, while Belmont (joined in 2012), SIU Edwardsville (joined in 2008), and Tennessee–Martin (joined in 1992) have never won championships. The Tournament began in 1979.

== Seeding and format ==
The top six regular season finishers will be seeded by conference winning percentage. Teams will then play a double-elimination tournament, with the top two seeds receiving a single bye. Austin Peay vacated four wins from the season, making their record 17–9 for conference purposes, and dropping them to the third seed.

Team	W	L	Pct	GB	Seed
Southeast Missouri State	22	8	.733	—	1
Jacksonville State	20	10	.667	2	2
Austin Peay	17	9	.654	3	3
Morehead State	17	13	.567	5	4
Tennessee Tech	17	13	.567	5	5
Belmont	17	13	.567	5	6
Murray State	15	15	.482	7	—
Eastern Kentucky	13	17	.433	9	—
Tennessee–Martin	9	21	.300	13	—
Eastern Illinois	8	22	.267	14	—
SIU Edwardsvills	6	24	.200	16	—

== Results ==
Upper round 1	Upper round 2	Upper final	Final
1	Southeast Missouri State	3
4	Morehead State	4	4	Morehead State	0
5	Tennessee Tech	3	1	Southeast Missouri State	7
2	Jacksonville State	11
2	Jacksonville State	12
3	Austin Peay	12	3	Austin Peay	10
6	Belmont	7
2	Jacksonville State	7	8
1	Southeast Missouri State	10	14
Lower round 1	Lower round 2	Lower round 3	Lower final
1	Southeast Missouri State	10
6	Belmont	4	3	Austin Peay	4
6	Belmont	8	3	Austin Peay	7
5	Tennessee Tech	8	4	Morehead State	0
6	Belmont	9
