= Matt Bragga =

American baseball coach and former player

Current position
- Title: Head coach
- Team: Tennessee Tech
- Conference: Ohio Valley
- Record: 581–536–1

Biographical details
- Born: July 20, 1972 (age 53)

Playing career
- 1991–1994: Kentucky
- Position: Utility

Coaching career (HC unless noted)
- 1996: Northport (AL) Tuscaloosa County (asst.)
- 1997–2000: Bevill State CC
- 2001–2003: Birmingham–Southern (Asst)
- 2004–2018: Tennessee Tech
- 2019–2021: Rice
- 2022–present: Tennessee Tech

Head coaching record
- Overall: 632–612–3 (NCAA) 148-86 (NJCAA)
- Tournaments: NCAA: 5–5

Accomplishments and honors

Championships
- As assistant coach: NAIA World Series (2001); As head coach: 4x OVC regular season (2010, 2013, 2017, 2018); 2× OVC tournament (2009, 2017)

Matthew A. Bragga (born July 20, 1972) is an American baseball coach and former utility player, who is the current head baseball coach of the Tennessee Tech Golden Eagles. He played college baseball at Kentucky for coach Keith Madison from 1991 to 1994. He then served as the head coach of the Tennessee Tech Golden Eagles (2004–2018) and the Rice Owls (2019–2021).

== Playing career ==
Bragga was a 4-year letter winner for the Kentucky Wildcats baseball team from 1991 through 1994. He signed as a free agent with the Cincinnati Reds organization and played two years of minor league baseball for the Butte Copper Kings and the Charleston AlleyCats.

== Coaching career ==
In 1996, Bragga began his coaching career as an assistant at Tuscaloosa County High School in Northport, Alabama. The following season, he accepted the head coaching position at Bevill State Community College. In 2001, Bragga accepted a position as an assistant coach at Birmingham–Southern College. The 2001, Birmingham–Southern finished 55–11 and won the NAIA World Series.

On December 5, 2003, Bragga accepted the position of head baseball coach at Tennessee Tech university. He spent 15 seasons as the head coach at Tennessee Tech. After Bragga's first 3 seasons, Tennessee Tech had compiled a record of 46-109 (.297), but in his last 12 years as head coach he accumulated 400 wins and 283 losses (.585). He compiled 6 conference championships in his last 10 years at TTU, culminating with a 53-win campaign in 2018 when his Golden Eagles were 1 win away from reaching the college World Series in Omaha Nebraska.

On June 15, 2018, Bragga was announced as the new head coach of the Rice Owls baseball program.

On May 23, 2021, Bragga was fired after compiling a record of 51–76–1 in 3 seasons.

On November 8, 2021, Tennessee Tech announced that Bragga would return to Tennessee Tech as the 16th coach in program history (he was also the 13th) starting November 11, 2021.

== Head coaching record ==
Record table
Season	Team	Overall	Conference	Standing	Postseason
Bevill State Community College (Alabama Community College Conference) (1997–2000)
1997	Bevill State Community College	34-23			ACCC Tournament
1998	Bevill State Community College	39-20			ACCC Tournament
1999	Bevill State Community College	40-19			ACCC Tournament
2000	Bevill State Community College	35-24			ACCC Tournament
Bevill State Community College:		148-86			
Tennessee Tech Golden Eagles (Ohio Valley Conference) (2004–2018)
2004	Tennessee Tech	15–31	10–16	8th	
2005	Tennessee Tech	13–42	6–20	9th	
2006	Tennessee Tech	18–36	11–16	7th	
2007	Tennessee Tech	26–28	12–15	5th	
2008	Tennessee Tech	35–23–1	13–14	5th	Ohio Valley tournament
2009	Tennessee Tech	31–24–1	10–11–1	5th	NCAA Regionals
2010	Tennessee Tech	31–25	14–6	1st	Ohio Valley tournament
2011	Tennessee Tech	25–29	12–12	4th	Ohio Valley tournament
2012	Tennessee Tech	21–32	10–16	8th	
2013	Tennessee Tech	40–17	24–6	1st	Ohio Valley tournament
2014	Tennessee Tech	40–19	18–12	2nd	Ohio Valley tournament
2015	Tennessee Tech	26–29	16–14	2nd	Ohio Valley tournament
2016	Tennessee Tech	31–24	17–13	4th	Ohio Valley tournament
2017	Tennessee Tech	41–21	23–7	1st	NCAA Regionals
2018	Tennessee Tech	53–12	27–3	1st	NCAA Super Regionals
Rice Owls (Conference USA) (2019–2021)
2019	Rice	26–33	14–16	7th	Conference USA tournament
2020	Rice	2–14	0–0		Season canceled due to COVID-19
2021	Rice	23–29–1	11–20–1	5th (West)	
Rice:		51–76–1	25–36–1		
Tennessee Tech Golden Eagles (Ohio Valley Conference) (2022–present)
2022	Tennessee Tech	30–27	11–13	T-6th	Ohio Valley tournament
2023	Tennessee Tech	21–34	10–14	6th	Ohio Valley tournament
2024	Tennessee Tech	29–26	13–14	5th	Ohio Valley tournament
2025	Tennessee Tech	37–20	18–9	3rd	Ohio Valley tournament
2026	Tennessee Tech	18–37	6–21	10th	
Tennessee Tech:		581–536–1	281–252–1		
Total:		632–612–3			
National champion Postseason invitational champion Conference regular season champion Conference regular season and conference tournament champion Division regular season champion Division regular season and conference tournament champion Conference tournament champion
