= 2014 Ohio Valley Conference baseball tournament =

- 2014 OVC Baseball tournament logo
- Teams: 6
- Format: Double-elimination
- Finals site: The Ballpark at Jackson; Jackson, TN
- Champions: Jacksonville State (4th title)
- Winning coach: Jim Case (3rd title)
- MVP: Pitching staff (Jacksonville State)

2014 Ohio Valley Conference baseball standings
	Conf.						Overall
Team	W		L		T	PCT	W		L		T	PCT
SE Missouri State ‍†‍‍	23	–	7	–	0	.767	37	–	20	–	0	.649
Tennessee Tech ‍‍‍	18	–	12	–	0	.600	40	–	19	–	0	.678
Jacksonville State ‍‍‡‍^{y}	18	–	12	–	0	.600	36	–	27	–	0	.571
Morehead State ‍‍‍	16	–	14	–	0	.533	29	–	28	–	0	.509
SIU Edwardsville ‍‍‍	16	–	14	–	0	.533	21	–	33	–	0	.389
Eastern Illinois ‍‍‍	15	–	14	–	1	.517	22	–	33	–	1	.402
Murray State ‍‍‍	14	–	16	–	0	.467	23	–	29	–	0	.442
Austin Peay ‍‍‍	14	–	16	–	0	.467	23	–	33	–	0	.411
Belmont ‍‍‍	13	–	16	–	1	.450	24	–	30	–	1	.445
Eastern Kentucky ‍‍‍	12	–	18	–	0	.400	24	–	31	–	0	.436
Tennessee–Martin ‍‍‍	5	–	25	–	0	.167	9	–	42	–	0	.176
† – Conference champion ‡ – Tournament champion y – Invited to the NCAA tournament Rankings from Collegiate Baseball

The 2014 Ohio Valley Conference baseball tournament was held from May 21 through 25. The top six regular season finishers met in the double-elimination tournament, held at The Ballpark at Jackson in Jackson, Tennessee. Jacksonville State won the tournament for the fourth time, earning the conference's automatic bid to the 2014 NCAA Division I baseball tournament

== Seeding and format ==
The top six teams are taken and seeded by conference winning percentage. Teams then play a double-elimination tournament, with the top two seeds receiving a single bye.

Team	W	L	T	Pct	GB	Seed
Southeast Missouri State	23	7	0	.767	-	1
Tennessee Tech	18	12	0	.600	5	2
Jacksonville State	18	12	0	.600	5	3
x-SIU Edwardsville	16	14	0	.533	7	4
x-Morehead State	16	14	0	.533	7	5
Eastern Illinois	15	14	1	.517	7.5	6
Murray State	14	16	0	.467	8	-
Austin Peay	14	16	0	.467	8	-
Belmont	13	16	1	.450	8.5	-
Eastern Kentucky	12	18	0	.400	10	–
Tennessee-Martin	5	25	0	.167	17	–

Tiebreakers:
x- SIU Edwardsville wins 4 seed from 2–1 record vs. Morehead State.

== Results ==
Upper round 1	Upper round 2	Upper final	Final
1	SE Missouri State	8
4	SIU Edwardsville	6	6	Eastern Illinois	6
5	Morehead State	11	1	SE Missouri State	2
2	Tennessee Tech	9
2	Tennessee Tech	14
3	Jacksonville State	1	5	Morehead State	2
6	Eastern Illinois	2
2	Tennessee Tech	7	2
3	Jacksonville State	10	4
Lower round 1	Lower round 2	Lower round 3	Lower final
3	Jacksonville State	6
3	Jacksonville State	7	1	SE Missouri State	2
3	Jacksonville State	13	5	Morehead State	1
4	SIU Edwardsville	5	6	Eastern Illinois	2
3	Jacksonville State	7

== All-Tournament Team ==
The following players were named to the All-Tournament Team. Jacksonville State's entire pitching staff was given the MVP award.

Name	Team
Matt Borens	Eastern Illinois
Cole Bieser	Southeast Missouri State
Dylan Bosheers	Tennessee Tech
Daniel Miles	Tennessee Tech
David Hess	Tennessee Tech
Tyler Gamble	Jacksonville State
Griff Gordon	Jacksonville State
Paschal Petrongolo	Jacksonville State
Ryan Sebra	Jacksonville State
Michael Bishop	Jacksonville State
Casey Antley	Jacksonville State
Zachary Fowler	Jacksonville State
Travis Stout	Jacksonville State
