= 2013 Ohio Valley Conference baseball tournament =

- Teams: 6
- Format: Double-elimination
- Finals site: The Ballpark at Jackson; Jackson, TN
- Champions: Austin Peay (6th title)
- Winning coach: Gary McClure (6th title)
- MVP: Reed Harper (Austin Peay)

2013 Ohio Valley Conference baseball standings
	Conf.				Overall
Team	W		L	PCT	W		L	PCT
Tennessee Tech ‍†‍‍	24	–	6	.800	40	–	17	.702
Austin Peay ‍‍‡‍^{y}	22	–	7	.759	47	–	15	.758
Belmont ‍‍‍	22	–	8	.733	38	–	20	.655
Jacksonville State ‍‍‍	22	–	8	.733	32	–	26	.552
Eastern Kentucky ‍‍‍	16	–	13	.552	23	–	34	.404
Southeast Missouri State ‍‍‍	13	–	17	.433	26	–	33	.441
Eastern Illinois ‍‍‍	11	–	17	.393	22	–	27	.449
SIU Edwardsville ‍‍‍	10	–	20	.333	16	–	35	.314
Morehead State ‍‍‍	10	–	20	.333	16	–	40	.286
Murray State ‍‍‍	9	–	21	.300	21	–	33	.389
Tennessee–Martin ‍‍‍	4	–	26	.133	11	–	40	.216
† – Conference champion ‡ – Tournament champion y – Invited to the NCAA tournament As of June 4, 2013; Rankings from Collegiate Baseball

The 2013 Ohio Valley Conference baseball tournament was held from May 22 through 25. The top six regular season finishers met in the double-elimination tournament, which was held at Pringles Park in Jackson, Tennessee. The tournament champion will earn the conference's automatic bid to the 2013 NCAA Division I baseball tournament.

== Seeding and format ==
The top six regular season finishers were seeded by conference winning percentage. Teams then played a double-elimination tournament, with the top two seeds receiving a single bye. Belmont claimed the third seed over Jacksonville State by tiebreaker.

Team	W	L	Pct.	GB	Seed
Tennessee Tech	24	6	.800	–	1
Austin Peay	22	7	.759	1.5	2
Belmont	22	8	.733	2	3
Jacksonville State	22	8	.733	2	4
Eastern Kentucky	16	13	.552	7.5	5
Southeast Missouri State	13	17	.433	11	6
Eastern Illinois	11	17	.393	12	–
SIU Edwardsville	10	20	.333	14	–
Morehead State	10	20	.333	14	–
Murray State	9	21	.300	15	–
Tennessee–Martin	4	26	.133	20	–

== Results ==
Upper round 1	Upper round 2	Upper final	Final
1	Tennessee Tech	5
4	Jacksonville State	2	6	Southeast Missouri State	1
5	Eastern Kentucky	11	1	Tennessee Tech	2
2	Austin Peay	6
2	Austin Peay	13
3	Belmont	6	5	Eastern Kentucky	4
6	Southeast Missouri State	9
2	Austin Peay	6	—
5	Eastern Kentucky	3	—
Lower round 1	Lower round 2	Lower round 3	Lower final
1	Tennessee Tech	4
6	Southeast Missouri State	9	5	Eastern Kentucky	6
6	Southeast Missouri State	2	5	Eastern Kentucky	12
4	Jacksonville State	3	3	Belmont	1
3	Belmont	6

== All-Tournament team ==
The following players were named to the All-Tournament team.

Name	School
Craig Massoni	Austin Peay
Jordan Hankins	Austin Peay
Reed Harper	Austin Peay
Cody Hudson	Austin Peay
Michael Davis	Austin Peay
Alex Hughes	Eastern Kentucky
Luke Wurzelbacher	Eastern Kentucky
Kyle Nowlin	Eastern Kentucky
Bryan Soloman	Eastern Kentucky
Shane Grimm	Eastern Kentucky
Tristan Archer	Tennessee Tech
Jason Blum	Southeast Missouri State
Chas Brookshire	Belmont

=== Most Valuable Player ===
Austin Peay infielder Reed Harper was named the tournament's Most Valuable Player.
