= 2026 Ohio Valley Conference baseball tournament =

- Teams: 8
- Format: Single-elimination/Double-elimination
- Finals site: Mtn Dew Park; Marion, Illinois
- Champions: Little Rock (2nd title)
- Winning coach: Chris Curry (2nd title)
- MVP: Tag Andrews (Little Rock)
- Television: ESPN+

2026 Ohio Valley Conference baseball standings
| | Conf. | | | | Overall |
| Team | W | | L | PCT | W | | L | PCT |
|---|---|---|---|---|---|---|---|---|
| SIU Edwardsville ‍†‍‍ | 19 | – | 7 | .731 | 32 | – | 22 | .593 |
| Eastern Illinois ‍‍‍ | 18 | – | 9 | .667 | 31 | – | 19 | .620 |
| Southeast Missouri State ‍‍‍ | 18 | – | 9 | .667 | 38 | – | 16 | .704 |
| No. 21 Little Rock ‍‍‡‍^{y} | 16 | – | 11 | .593 | 30 | – | 25 | .545 |
| Morehead State ‍‍‍ | 15 | – | 12 | .556 | 31 | – | 24 | .564 |
| Lindenwood ‍‍‍ | 13 | – | 14 | .481 | 29 | – | 26 | .527 |
| UT Martin ‍‍‍ | 11 | – | 15 | .423 | 25 | – | 29 | .463 |
| Southern Indiana ‍‍‍ | 10 | – | 17 | .370 | 28 | – | 27 | .509 |
| Western Illinois ‍‍‍ | 8 | – | 19 | .296 | 16 | – | 36 | .308 |
| Tennessee Tech ‍‍‍ | 6 | – | 21 | .222 | 18 | – | 37 | .327 |
† – Conference champion ‡ – Tournament champion y – Invited to the NCAA Tournament; As of May 17, 2026; Rankings from D1Baseball

The 2026 Ohio Valley Conference baseball tournament was held from May 19 through 24 at Mtn Dew Park in Marion, Illinois. The top eight regular season finishers of the conference's ten teams met in the tournament, with the top 4 teams receiving byes to the double elimination rounds.

The Little Rock Trojans won the tournament for the second year in a row.

== Seeding and format ==
The top eight finishers of the league's ten teams qualify for the conference tournament. Teams are seeded based on conference winning percentage, with the first tiebreaker being head-to-head record.

== Bracket ==
Upper round 1
6 | Lindenwood | 7
7 | UT Martin | 4
5 | Morehead State | 2
8 | Southern Indiana | 6

Upper round 2
3 | Southeast Missouri State | 2
6 | Lindenwood | 1
4 | Little Rock | 7
8 | Southern Indiana | 3
Lower round 2
8 | Southern Indiana | 5
3 | Southeast Missouri State | 3
6 | Lindenwood | 3
4 | Little Rock | 4

Upper final
2 | Eastern Illinois | 3
3 | Southeast Missouri State | 2
1 | SIU-Edwardsville | 4
4 | Little Rock | 3
Lower round 3
8 | Southern Indiana | 2
4 | Little Rock | 7

Semifinals
2 | Eastern Illinois | 3^{(10)}
1 | SIU-Edwardsville | 2
Lower final
1 | SIU-Edwardsville | 5
4 | Little Rock | 7

Final
2 | Eastern Illinois | 3 | 6
4 | Little Rock | 4 | 10

== Schedule ==
| Game | Time* | Matchup^{#} | Score | Notes | Reference |
Tuesday, May 19
| 1 | 3:00 pm | No. 7 UT Martin vs No. 6 Lindenwood | 4–7 | UT Martin Eliminated | |
| 2 | 7:00 pm | No. 8 Southern Indiana vs No. 5 Morehead State | 6–2 | Morehead State Eliminated | |
Wednesday, May 20
| 3 | 3:00 pm | No. 6 Lindenwood vs No. 3 Southeast Missouri State | 1–2 | | |
| 4 | 7:00 pm | No. 8 Southern Indiana vs No. 4 Little Rock | 3–7 | | |
Thursday, May 21
| 5 | 9:30 am | No. 3 Southeast Missouri State vs No. 2 Eastern Illinois | 2–3 | | |
| 6 | 1:00 pm | No. 4 Little Rock vs No. 1 SIU-Edwardsville | 3–4 | | |
| 7 | 4:30 pm | No. 8 Southern Indiana vs No. 3 Southeast Missouri State | 5–3 | Southeast Missouri St. Eliminated | |
| 8 | 8:00 pm | No. 6 Lindenwood vs No. 4 Little Rock | 3–4 | Lindenwood Eliminated | |
Friday, May 22
| 9 | 11:00 am | No. 2 Eastern Illinois vs No. 1 SIU-Edwardsville | 3–2^{(10)} | | |
| 10 | 6:20 pm | No. 8 Southern Indiana vs No. 4 Little Rock | 2–7 | Southern Indiana Eliminated | |
Saturday, May 23
| 11 | 1:00 pm | No. 1 SIU-Edwardsville vs No. 4 Little Rock | 5–7 | SIU-Edwardsville Eliminated | |
| 12 | 5:00 pm | No. 4 Little Rock vs No. 2 Eastern Illinois | 4–3 | Little Rock forces if necessary game | |
Sunday, May 24
| 13 | 12:00 pm | No. 2 Eastern Illinois vs No. 4 Little Rock | 6–10 | Little Rock wins OVC championship | |
