= 2022 Ohio Valley Conference baseball tournament =

- Teams: 8
- Format: Double-elimination
- Finals site: Wild Health Field; Lexington, Kentucky
- Television: ESPN+

2022 Ohio Valley Conference baseball standings
	Conf.				Overall
Team	W		L	PCT	W		L	PCT
Belmont ‍†‍‍	18	–	5	.783	39	–	20	.661
Southeast Missouri State ‍‍‡‍^{y}	16	–	8	.667	37	–	20	.649
Morehead State ‍‍‍	14	–	10	.583	27	–	27	.500
Eastern Illinois ‍‍‍	12	–	12	.500	33	–	20	.623
SIU Edwardsville ‍‍‍	11	–	12	.478	27	–	28	.491
Tennessee Tech ‍‍‍	11	–	13	.458	21	–	16	.568
Murray State ‍‍‍	11	–	13	.458	30	–	25	.545
Austin Peay ‍‍‍	10	–	14	.417	19	–	37	.339
UT Martin ‍‍‍	4	–	20	.167	11	–	34	.244
‡ – Tournament champion y – Invited to the NCAA tournament Rankings from D1Baseball

The 2022 Ohio Valley Conference baseball tournament was held from May 25 through 28. The top eight regular season finishers met in the double-elimination tournament, held at Wild Health Field in Lexington, Kentucky. The tournament champion earned the conference's automatic bid to the 2022 NCAA Division I baseball tournament Among current members, Austin Peay has won the most championships, with six, while Belmont (joined in 2012), SIU Edwardsville (joined in 2008), and UT Martin (joined in 1992) have never won championships. The Tournament began in 1979.

== Seeding and format ==
The top eight regular season finishers will be seeded by conference winning percentage. The bottom six seeds will play a single elimination round, with the fifth and eighth seeds facing off while the sixth and seventh seeds play each other. The winners will then play the third and fourth seeds, with the winners meeting the top two seeds in the double-elimination championship round. The final will be a winner-take-all game.

== Results ==
Bracket A

Semifinal			Final
			4	Eastern Illinois	6
5	SIU Edwardsville	13	5	SIU Edwardsville	8
8	Austin Peay	1

Bracket B

Semifinal			Final
			3	Morehead State	9
6	Tennessee Tech	9	6	Tennessee Tech	11
7	Murray State	2

Double-elimination round

First round
1	Belmont	10
5	SIU Edwardsville	9
Winner's bracket
2	Southeast Missouri State	10
6	Tennessee Tech	11
5	SIU Edwardsville	6
2	Southeast Missouri State	14
Loser's bracket

Semi-finals
1	Belmont	8
6	Tennessee Tech	3
2	Southeast Missouri State	5
6	Tennessee Tech	2

Finals
1	Belmont	4
2	Southeast Missouri State	5
