= Jason Stein =

American baseball player and coach

Current position
- Title: Assistant Coach / Recruiting Coordinator
- Team: Belmont
- Conference: MVC

Biographical details
- Born: Ashland, Kentucky, U.S.

Playing career
- 1992–1995: Eastern Kentucky
- Position: 2B/SS

Coaching career (HC unless noted)
- 1996–2000: Eastern Kentucky (Asst.)
- 2001–2008: Belmont (Asst.)
- 2009–2015: Eastern Kentucky
- 2016–2022: Duke (Asst.)
- 2023: Middle Tennessee State (Asst.)
- 2024–Present: Belmont (Asst.)

Head coaching record
- Overall: 175–204

Jason Stein is an American college baseball coach and former middle infielder. He is the hitting and infield coach for Duke University. He played college baseball at Eastern Kentucky University from 1992 to 1995 for head coach Jim Ward. He was the head baseball coach for Eastern Kentucky University from 2009 to 2015

== Playing career ==
Stein played at Eastern Kentucky, known as a defensive specialist. In his sophomore campaign, the second baseman batted .378 and earned the OVC batting title. He remained among conference leaders in his junior year, and moved to shortstop for his senior season. Serving as co-captain, Stein earned first team All-Conference, striking out just five times while collecting 76 hits. He played one season with the independent Anderson Lawmen before returning to Richmond as a student assistant coach while finishing his degree.

== Coaching career ==
After spending the 1996 season as a student assistant, Stein was promoted to a full-time assistant coach for the 1997 season. He spent four seasons on the staff of head coach Jim Ward. In 1998, he was named recruiting coordinator. After the 2000 season, Stein moved to Belmont as an assistant coach and recruiting coordinator. In 2009, he returned to Eastern Kentucky as head coach.

== Head coaching record ==
Record table
Season	Team	Overall	Conference	Standing	Postseason
Eastern Kentucky (Ohio Valley Conference) (2009–present)
2009	Eastern Kentucky	27–24	10–13	5th (9)	
2010	Eastern Kentucky	28–27	9–12	6th (9)	
2011	Eastern Kentucky	21–36	11–13	5th (9)	
2012	Eastern Kentucky	31–23	19–7	T-1st (10)	OVC Tournament (Note: The top six finishers of the OVC's nine eligible teams qualified for the Tournament in 2012.)
2013	Eastern Kentucky	23–34	16–13	5th (11)	OVC Tournament (Note: The top six finishers of the OVC's eleven teams qualified for the Tournament in 2013.)
2014	Eastern Kentucky	24–31	12–18	10th (11)	
2015	Eastern Kentucky	21–29	12–17	8th	
Eastern Kentucky:		175–204	89–93		
Total:		175–204			
National champion Postseason invitational champion Conference regular season champion Conference regular season and conference tournament champion Division regular season champion Division regular season and conference tournament champion Conference tournament champion
