= 2017 Ohio Valley Conference baseball tournament =

- Teams: 6
- Format: Double-elimination
- Finals site: Choccolocco Park; Oxford, Alabama

2017 Ohio Valley Conference baseball standings
	Conf.				Overall
Team	W		L	PCT	W		L	PCT
Tennessee Tech ‍†‍‡‍^{y}	23	–	7	.767	41	–	21	.661
Morehead State ‍‍‍	18	–	11	.621	36	–	23	.610
Belmont ‍‍‍	17	–	13	.567	31	–	29	.517
Jacksonville State ‍‍‍	17	–	13	.567	30	–	26	.536
SE Missouri State ‍‍‍	16	–	14	.533	29	–	26	.527
Murray State ‍‍‍	15	–	15	.500	29	–	30	.492
Austin Peay ‍‍‍	13	–	16	.448	28	–	30	.483
Eastern Illinois ‍‍‍	12	–	18	.400	21	–	35	.375
Tennessee–Martin ‍‍‍	12	–	18	.400	25	–	30	.455
SIU Edwardsville ‍‍‍	11	–	19	.367	23	–	29	.442
Eastern Kentucky ‍‍‍	10	–	20	.333	24	–	32	.429
† – Conference champion ‡ – Tournament champion y – Invited to the NCAA tournament Rankings from Collegiate Baseball

The 2017 Ohio Valley Conference baseball tournament was held from May 24 through 28. The top six regular season finishers met in the double-elimination tournament, held at Choccolocco Park in Oxford, Alabama. The tournament champion earned the conference's automatic bid to the 2017 NCAA Division I baseball tournament. Among current members, Austin Peay has won the most championships, with six, while Belmont (joined in 2012), SIU Edwardsville (joined in 2008), and Tennessee–Martin (joined in 1992) have never won championships. The Tournament began in 1979.

== Seeding and format ==
The top six regular season finishers will be seeded by conference winning percentage. Teams will then play a double-elimination tournament, with the top two seeds receiving a single bye.

== Results ==
Upper round 1	Upper round 2	Upper final	Final
1	Tennessee Tech	14
5	Southeast Missouri State	9
4	Jacksonville State	10
5	Southeast Missouri	13
1	Tennessee Tech	8
2	Morehead State	6
2	Morehead State	9
7	Austin Peay	4
2	Morehead State	12
6	Murray State	6
3	Belmont	3
6	Murray State	9
1	Tennessee Tech	16	-
3	Belmont	4	-
Lower round 1	Lower round 2	Lower round 3	Lower final
3	Belmont	6
4	Jacksonville State	7	7	Austin Peay	1	2	Morehead State	6
7	Austin Peay	8	3	Belmont	5	3	Belmont	11
6	Murray State	4
5	Southeast Missouri State	5
6	Murray State	8
