= 2018 Ohio Valley Conference baseball tournament =

- Teams: 8
- Format: Double-elimination
- Finals site: Choccolocco Park; Oxford, Alabama
- Champions: Morehead State

2018 Ohio Valley Conference baseball standings
	Conf.				Overall
Team	W		L	PCT	W		L	PCT
No. 22 Tennessee Tech ‍‍‍	27	–	3	.900	46	–	7	.868
Southeast Missouri State ‍‍‍	20	–	10	.667	26	–	28	.481
Morehead State ‍‍‍	18	–	12	.600	32	–	23	.582
Jacksonville State ‍‍‍	18	–	12	.600	30	–	23	.566
Austin Peay ‍‍‍	17	–	13	.567	30	–	25	.545
Eastern Kentucky ‍‍‍	15	–	15	.500	27	–	29	.482
Murray State ‍‍‍	13	–	16	.448	26	–	27	.491
Eastern Illinois ‍‍‍	12	–	18	.400	23	–	30	.434
Belmont ‍‍‍	11	–	19	.367	19	–	36	.345
UT Martin ‍‍‍	7	–	22	.241	11	–	40	.216
SIU Edwardsville ‍‍‍	6	–	24	.200	15	–	37	.288
As of May 20, 2018; Rankings from Collegiate Baseball

The 2018 Ohio Valley Conference baseball tournament was held from May 22 through 27. The top eight regular season finishers met in the double-elimination tournament, held at Choccolocco Park in Oxford, Alabama. As tournament champion, Morehead State earned the conference's automatic bid to the 2017 NCAA Division I baseball tournament Among current members, Austin Peay has won the most championships, with six, while Belmont (joined in 2012), SIU Edwardsville (joined in 2008), and Tennessee–Martin (joined in 1992) have never won championships. The Tournament began in 1979.

== Seeding and format ==
The top eight regular season finishers will be seeded by conference winning percentage. After a play-in round between the bottom two seeds, the remaining seven teams will play a double-elimination tournament, with the top seed receiving a single bye.

== Results ==
Play in round

Team	R
#8 Eastern Illinois	5
#7 Murray State	15

Upper round 1	Upper round 2	Upper final	Final
1	Tennessee Tech	5
4	Jacksonville State	2
4	Jacksonville State	8
5	Austin Peay	2
1	Tennessee Tech	10
3	Morehead State	5
2	Southeast Missouri	5
7	Murray State	2
2	Southeast Missouri	9
3	Morehead State	18
3	Morehead State	12
6	Eastern Kentucky	7
1	Tennessee Tech	6	3
3	Morehead State	11	4
Lower round 1	Lower round 2	Lower round 3	Lower final
5	Austin Peay	1
6	Eastern Kentucky	13	6	Eastern Kentucky	5	3	Morehead State	5
7	Murray State	6	6	Eastern Kentucky	11^{14}	6	Eastern Kentucky	2
4	Jacksonville State	8
4	Jacksonville State	11
2	Southeast Missouri	0
