= Andy Sawyers =

American baseball coach (born 1975)

Current position
- Title: Head coach
- Team: Southeast Missouri State
- Conference: Ohio Valley
- Record: 286–240

Biographical details
- Born: May 24, 1975 (age 50); Willits, California, U.S.

Playing career
- 1994: Point Loma Nazarene
- 1996: Mendocino College
- 1997–1998: Nebraska
- Position: Catcher

Coaching career (HC unless noted)
- 1999: Northwestern State (vol asst.)
- 2000: Nebraska (vol asst.)
- 2001–2002: Hutchinson Community College
- 2003–2007: Nebraska (asst.)
- 2008: Texas A&M (vol asst.)
- 2009–2010: Kansas State (asst.)
- 2011, 2014: Texas A&M (asst.)
- 2015–2016: Kansas State (asst.)
- 2017–present: Southeast Missouri State

Head coaching record
- Overall: 286–240 (NCAA) 87–27 (NJCAA)
- Tournaments: Ohio Valley: 12–9; NCAA: 2–6

Accomplishments and honors

Championships
- 2 KJCCC regular season (2001–02); OVC regular season (2021); 3 OVC Tournament (2021–2022, 2024)

Andrew Sawyers (born May 24, 1975) is an American college baseball coach and former catcher. Sawyers is the head coach of the Southeast Missouri State Redhawks baseball team.

== Playing career ==
Sawyers attended Willits High School in Willits, California. Sawyers played for the school's varsity baseball team. Sawyers then enrolled at Point Loma Nazarene University to play college baseball for the Point Loma Sea Lions baseball team.

As a freshman at Point Loma Nazarene University in 1994, Sawyers didn't appear in a single game.

After taking a year off, Sawyers returned to baseball at Mendocino College.

In the 1997 season as a junior, Sawyers transferred to play baseball for Nebraska and hit .268, hit 5 home runs, slugged .395 and had 38 RBIs.

As a senior in 1998, Sawyers had a .163 batting average, a .258 on OBP and appeared in 22 games.

== Coaching career ==
Sawyers earned his first ever head coaching job at Hutchinson Community College.

Sawyers served as an assistant at Texas A&M during the 2008 season while earning his master's degree.

On June 27, 2008, Sawyers was named an assistant coach for the Kansas State Wildcats baseball.

On July 29, 2016, Sawyers was named the head coach at Southeast Missouri State University.

== Head coaching record ==
Record table
Season	Team	Overall	Conference	Standing	Postseason
Hutchinson Community College (KJCCC) (2001–2002)
2001	Hutchinson Community College	40–16		1st	West–Sub Regionals
2002	Hutchinson Community College	47–11		1st	Region IV Runners–Up
Hutchinson Community College:		87–27			
Southeast Missouri State (Ohio Valley Conference) (2017–present)
2017	Southeast Missouri State	29–26	16–14	5th	Ohio Valley tournament
2018	Southeast Missouri State	27–30	20–10	2nd	Ohio Valley tournament
2019	Southeast Missouri State	23–32	10–20	10th	
2020	Southeast Missouri State	9–8	2–1		Season canceled due to COVID-19
2021	Southeast Missouri State	30–22	17–10	1st	NCAA Regional
2022	Southeast Missouri State	37–22	16–8	2nd	NCAA Regional
2023	Southeast Missouri State	26–30	14–10	T-3rd	Ohio Valley tournament
2024	Southeast Missouri State	36–27	18–9	2nd	NCAA Regional
2025	Southeast Missouri State	30-25	16-11		
2026	Southeast Missouri State	39-18	18-9	2nd	
Southeast Missouri State:		286–240	147–102		
Total:		286–240			
National champion Postseason invitational champion Conference regular season champion Conference regular season and conference tournament champion Division regular season champion Division regular season and conference tournament champion Conference tournament champion

== See also ==
- List of current NCAA Division I baseball coaches
