= Steve Bieser =

American baseball player (born 1967)

Grand Canyon Antelopes baseball
- Outfielder / Coach
- Born: August 4, 1967 (age 59); Ste. Genevieve, Missouri, U.S.
- Batted: Left Threw: Right

MLB debut
- April 1, 1997, for the New York Mets

Last MLB appearance
- July 28, 1998, for the Pittsburgh Pirates

MLB statistics
- Batting average: .250
- Home runs: 0
- Runs batted in: 5
- Stats at Baseball Reference

Teams
- New York Mets (1997); Pittsburgh Pirates (1998)

Career highlights and awards
- C-USA Coach of the Year: (2026)

Steven Ray Bieser (born August 4, 1967) is an American former professional baseball catcher and outfielder, who is currently head baseball coach of the Grand Canyon Antelopes. He played college baseball at Jefferson College and Southeast Missouri State before playing professionally from 1989 to 2001. He then served as head coach of the Southeast Missouri State Redhawks (2013–2016), the Missouri Tigers (2017–2023) and the Jacksonville State Gamecocks (2024-2026).

== Amateur career ==
Bieser was not highly regarded as a prospect when he graduated from high school, where he played for the Ste. Genevieve Dragons, and after graduation he enrolled at Jefferson College, a junior college in Missouri. Jefferson's coach, David Oster, enjoyed a good reputation as an instructor, having coached seven players who made the Major Leagues (including Bieser) and having been selected to the National Junior College Baseball Hall of Fame in 2005. One season at Jefferson College and one season at Mineral Area College under Hal Loughary helped Bieser improve enough to make the team at Southeast Missouri State University.

== Professional career ==
After the end of Bieser's college career, the Philadelphia Phillies chose him in the 32nd round of the 1989 June draft, with the 818th overall pick. Very few players chosen that low in the draft advance to the major leagues, but Bieser defied the odds. He advanced to AAA within the Phillies' organization, and after signing with the New York Mets as a six-year minor league free agent, made his major league debut on April 1, 1997.

Bieser appeared in 47 games with the Mets that year, chiefly as a bench player. His left-handed bat, above-average foot speed, and ability to play multiple positions helped him stay on the roster for a large portion of the season, as these traits afforded manager Bobby Valentine an unusual variety of tactical options. As a further testament to his versatility as a player, Bieser also filled in as a pitcher in minor league games during at least six different seasons.

At the end of the year, he signed with the Pittsburgh Pirates as a free agent, and in 1998 he appeared in 13 games with that franchise. He finished his major league career with a .250 batting average, a .351 on-base percentage, and a .300 slugging percentage in 80 at bats. Continuing to play professionally after the end of his time in the majors, Bieser last appeared in uniform as a player with the Memphis Redbirds in 2001.

== Coaching career ==
=== High school and summer baseball ===
After his last game as a player, Bieser became a high school baseball coach at St. John Vianney High School, a private Catholic school in Kirkwood, Missouri. His squad won state championships in 2004 and 2006. As of 2009, Bieser was 117–42 in six seasons with the Vianney Griffins. Bieser also worked at the school as a math teacher. He left the position in 2010 for an assistant coaching position at Southeast Missouri State.

In 2009, Bieser was the manager of the Danville Dans, a team in the collegiate Prospect League.

=== Southeast Missouri State ===
Bieser was named head coach at Southeast Missouri State prior to the 2013 season. He led the Redhawks to three consecutive Ohio Valley Conference regular-season championships from 2014 to 2016. In 2016, Southeast Missouri State won the OVC tournament and advanced to the NCAA tournament. Bieser was named OVC Coach of the Year in 2014 and 2016.

=== Missouri ===
On June 30, 2016, the University of Missouri announced Bieser as its 14th baseball head coach, with a contract through 2021.

In his first three seasons, Missouri won 104 games, the most by any Missouri baseball coach in his first three seasons.

In 2019, Missouri extended his contract through the 2024 season.

On May 28, 2023, after three straight last-place finishes in the SEC East, Missouri fired Bieser.

=== Jacksonville State ===
On June 24, 2023, Bieser was named the eighth head coach of Jacksonville State, replacing the retiring Jim Case.

In 2026, Bieser led Jacksonville State to the Conference USA regular-season championship and tournament championship. The Gamecocks defeated Liberty 10–0 in the C-USA tournament championship game and advanced to an NCAA Regional final. Bieser was named the 2026 Keith LeClair Conference USA Coach of the Year.

=== Grand Canyon ===
On June 2, 2026, Bieser was named the head baseball coach at Grand Canyon University.

=== Head coaching record ===
Below is a table of Bieser's yearly records as an NCAA head baseball coach.

Record table
Season	Team	Overall	Conference	Standing	Postseason
Southeast Missouri State Redhawks (Ohio Valley Conference) (2013–2016)
2013	Southeast Missouri State	26–33	13–17	6th	
2014	Southeast Missouri State	37–20	23–7	1st	
2015	Southeast Missouri State	36–23	20–7	1st	
2016	Southeast Missouri State	39–21	22–8	1st	NCAA Regional
Southeast Missouri State:		138–97	78–39		
Missouri Tigers (Southeastern Conference) (2017–2023)
2017	Missouri	36–23	14–16	4th (East)*	
2018	Missouri	34–22	12–18	T–6th (East)	
2019	Missouri	34–22–1	13–16–1	4th (East)	
2020	Missouri	11–5	0–0	(East)	Season canceled due to COVID-19
2021	Missouri	15–36	8–22	7th (East)	
2022	Missouri	28–23	10–20	7th (East)	
2023	Missouri	30–24	10–20	7th (East)	
Missouri:		188–155–1	60–97–1		
Jacksonville State Gamecocks (Conference USA) (2024–present)
2024	Jacksonville State	18–34	5–19	9th	
2025	Jacksonville State	37–25	15–12	4th	C-USA tournament
2026	Jacksonville State	48–15	23–7	1st	NCAA Regional
Jacksonville State:		103–74	45–38		
Grand Canyon Antelopes (Mountain West Conference) (2027–present)
2027	Grand Canyon				
Total:		423–327–1			
National champion Postseason invitational champion Conference regular season champion Conference regular season and conference tournament champion Division regular season champion Division regular season and conference tournament champion Conference tournament champion

== See also ==
- List of current NCAA Division I baseball coaches
