= Joe Campbell (baseball) =

American baseball player (born 1944)

- Outfielder
- Born: March 10, 1944 (age 82); Louisville, Kentucky, U.S.
- Batted: Right Threw: Right

MLB debut
- May 3, 1967, for the Chicago Cubs

Last MLB appearance
- May 3, 1967, for the Chicago Cubs

MLB statistics
- Games played: 1
- Batting average: .000
- Strikeouts: 3
- Stats at Baseball Reference

Teams
- Chicago Cubs (1967)

Joseph Earl Campbell (born March 10, 1944) is an American former professional baseball player. He played the outfield position, and batted and threw right-handed. Campbell was born in Louisville, Kentucky. He played one game in Major League Baseball with the Chicago Cubs. Campbell had no hits in that game. Campbell also played four seasons in the minor leagues and over his career he batted .238 with 252 hits, 46 doubles, seven triples, and 41 home runs in 342 games played. The majority of his games in the minors came in the outfield, however, Campbell also played third base and first base. Outside of baseball, Campbell was a member of the United States Marine Corps.

== Amateur career ==
Campbell was a teammate of Denny Doyle at both Caverna High School in Horse Cave, Kentucky and Morehead State University. At Caverna High School, he and Doyle won a state high school baseball championship in 1961. Playing college baseball for the Morehead State Eagles baseball team, he was named All-Ohio Valley Conference in 1965.

== Professional career ==
=== New York Mets ===
In the first ever Major League Baseball amateur draft in 1965, Campbell was selected by the New York Mets in the 44^{th} round. This made him the first person selected from Morehead State in MLB's amateur draft. Campbell began his professional career that season with the rookie-level Marion Mets of the Appalachian League. In eight games, Campbell batted .385 with 10 hits, one double, and one home run. Later that season, he was promoted to the Class-A Greenville Mets of the Western Carolinas League. With Greenville, he batted .220 with 37 hits, four doubles, three triples, and six home runs in 52 games. He also pitched one game for Greenville and gave up one earned run in two innings pitched. Combined on the 1965 season, Campbell batted .242 with 47 hits, five doubles, three triples, and seven home runs in 60 games.

Campbell played most of the 1966 season with the Class-A Greenville Mets, however, he also spent time with the Double-A Williamsport Mets. With Greenville, Campbell .279 with 114 hits, 24 doubles, 3 triples, and 22 home runs in 120 games. That season, he led the Greenville Mets in home runs; and was second in doubles, and at-bats (408). At the Double-A level, Campbell batted .056 with one run, one hit, one double, three runs batted in (RBIs), and nine bases on balls (walks) in nine games. On the season, he had a combined average of .270 between the two teams.

=== Chicago Cubs ===
On November 28, 1966, during Major League Baseball's annual rule 5 draft, Campbell was selected from the New York Mets' organization by the Chicago Cubs. He missed most of spring training with the Cubs due to obligations in the United States Marine Corps, which he was a member of. Campbell played his first and only game in the majors on May 3, 1967, against the Atlanta Braves. In that game, Campbell had three at-bats and struck out in all of them.

=== Later career ===
After his only game in the majors, Campbell was returned to the New York Mets organization. He split the 1967 season between the Class-A Durham Bulls, and the Class-A Winter Haven Mets. With the Bulls, Campbell batted .198 with 26 hits, five doubles, three home runs, 11 RBIs, and three stolen bases in 42 games. In 38 games with Winter Haven, Campbell batted .165 with 17 hits, three doubles, four home runs, 14 RBIs, and three stolen bases. On the season, he had a combined batting average of .184. In his final professional season, 1968, Campbell played for the Class-A Raleigh-Durham Mets, and the Double-A Memphis Blues. With Raleigh-Durham, he batted .259 with 36 hits, six doubles, and five home runs in 50 games. Campbell spent 23 games with the Blues and batted .172 with five runs, 11 hits, three doubles, 1 triple, and four RBIs.
