= Winthrop Eagles baseball =

- 2026 Winthrop Eagles baseball team
- University: Winthrop University
- Head coach: Mike McGuire (2nd season)
- Conference: Big South
- Location: Rock Hill, South Carolina
- Home stadium: Winthrop Ballpark (Capacity: 1,989)
- Nickname: Eagles
- Colors: Garnet and gold

NCAA tournament appearances
- 1995, 1999, 2001, 2005, 2006

Conference tournament champions
- 1985, 1987, 1999, 2005

Conference regular season champions
- 1995, 2001, 2003, 2014, 2017

The Winthrop Eagles baseball team is a varsity intercollegiate athletic team of Winthrop University in Rock Hill, South Carolina, United States. The team is a member of the Big South Conference, which is part of the National Collegiate Athletic Association's Division I. The team plays its home games at Winthrop Ballpark in Rock Hill, South Carolina. The Eagles are coached by Mike McGuire.

== Winthrop in the NCAA tournament ==
Year	Record	Pct	Notes
1995	2–2	.500	East Regional
1999	1–2	.333	Auburn Regional
2001	2–2	.500	Wilson Regional
2005	1–2	.333	Knoxville Regional
2006	2–2	.500	Chapel Hill Regional
TOTALS	8-10	.444	

== Major League Baseball ==
Winthrop has had 34 Major League Baseball draft selections since the draft began in 1965.

Eagles in the Major League Baseball Draft
Year	Player	Round	Team
1984	Mark Beaver	32	Athletics
1984	Jim Thrift	28	Athletics
1984	Jeff Cisco	25	Expos
1984	Christopher Kahler	7	Indians
1987	Jeff Dodig	41	Braves
1987	James Malseed	33	Giants
1994	Carl Dale	2	Cardinals
1995	Bryan Link	12	Rangers
1996	Jeremy Keller	24	Reds
1996	Mark Richards	12	Angels
1997	Dave Steffler	67	Blue Jays
1997	Jeff Santa	47	Diamondbacks
2000	Jason Colson	12	Indians
2001	Jason Colson	7	Blue Jays
2002	Ben Thurmond	24	Cubs
2003	Jeremy Plexico	19	Expos
2005	Jon Wilson	27	Rangers
2005	Chris Leroux	7	Marlins
2005	Kevin Slowey	2	Twins
2005	Daniel Carte	2	Rockies
2006	Alan Robbins	32	Phillies
2006	Matt Repec	27	Rockies
2006	Jacob Dempsey	21	Phillies
2006	Heath Rollins	11	Devil Rays
2007	Chris Carrara	30	Yankees
2009	Kevin Nolan	20	Blue Jays
2009	John Murrian	9	Tigers
2011	Edward Rohan	50	Mets
2011	Tyler Mizenko	28	Giants
2013	Matt Pierpont	26	Rockies
2014	TJ Olesczuk	40	Orioles
2015	Joey Strain	22	Mariners
2019	Zach Peek	6	Angels
2019	Nate Pawelczyk	10	White Sox

== See also ==
- List of NCAA Division I baseball programs
