= Austin Peay Governors =

- University: Austin Peay State University
- Nickname: Governors
- NCAA: Division I (FCS)
- Conference: UAC (primary); ASUN (beach volleyball, men's tennis, women's lacrosse)
- Athletic director: Jordan Harmon
- Location: Clarksville, Tennessee
- Varsity teams: 17 (6 men's, 11 women's)
- Football stadium: Fortera Stadium
- Basketball arena: F&M Bank Arena
- Baseball stadium: Raymond C. Hand Park
- Softball stadium: Cathi Maynard Park
- Soccer stadium: Morgan Bros. Field
- Colors: Red and white
- Mascot: The Governor
- Website: letsgopeay.com
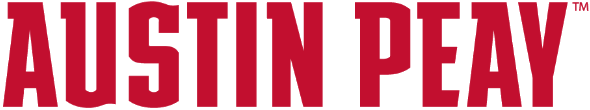

The Austin Peay Governors are the intercollegiate athletic teams of Austin Peay State University (APSU or Peay), located in Clarksville, Tennessee, United States. The Governors athletic program is a member of the NCAA Division I Atlantic Sun Conference (ASUN) for all sports except football, in which it competes in the United Athletic Conference (UAC). The latter conference started play in the 2023 season as a football-only merger between two conferences in the second tier of Division I football, the Football Championship Subdivision (FCS)—the ASUN and the Western Athletic Conference. Before the 2022–23 school year, the Governors were members of another FCS league, the Ohio Valley Conference (OVC). Beginning July 1, 2026, Austin Peay will leave the Atlantic Sun Conference and become a full member of the United Athletic Conference, coinciding with the rebranding of the Western Athletic Conference under the UAC name.

The Austin Peay mascot is The Governor, and the school colors are red and white. While the women's teams were formerly known as the Lady Govs, the school emphasizes that all teams are now Governors.

== Conference affiliations ==
NCAA

- Ohio Valley Conference (1962–2022)
- Atlantic Sun Conference (2022–2026)
- United Athletic Conference (2026–future)

== Varsity teams ==
| Men's sports | Women's sports |
|---|---|
| Baseball | Basketball |
| Basketball | Beach volleyball |
| Cross country | Cross country |
| Football | Golf |
| Golf | Lacrosse |
| Tennis | Soccer |
| | Softball |
| | Tennis |
| | Track and field^{1} |
| | Volleyball |
^{1} – includes both indoor and outdoor

Athletics began at Austin Peay almost as soon as the school opened for classes in 1929 as Austin Peay Normal School; men's and women's basketball teams were organized that first year. Football was added in the fall of 1930 and baseball in the spring of 1931, with other men's sports added and dropped over the years. Women's basketball was discontinued in 1938, but returned in 1973, along with volleyball, tennis, and golf when women's sports gained widespread inclusion.

A member of the Atlantic Sun Conference (ASUN) since July 1, 2022, Austin Peay State University sponsors teams in six men's and ten women's NCAA sanctioned sports.

Shortly after the 2022 football season, the ASUN and Western Athletic Conference (WAC), which had been partners in a football-only alliance in the 2021 and 2022 seasons, announced a full merger of their football leagues, creating what eventually became the UAC. Peay is one of nine inaugural members of the new conference, which started play in the 2023 season.

Women's lacrosse will become the 11th varsity women's sport and 17th overall in the 2026 season (2025–26 school year). The new team will play in the ASUN alongside most other Peay sports.

== Facilities ==
- Basketball: F&M Bank Arena
- Baseball: Joe Maynard Field at Raymond C. Hand Park
- Beach Volleyball: Atkins Family Beach Volleyball Facility
- Cross country: (Does not have home competition facility)
- Football: Fortera Stadium
- Golf: Swan Lake Golf Course, Clarksville Country Club & Karen Edwards Indoor Golf Facility
- Lacrosse: Morgan Brothers Field
- Soccer: Morgan Brothers Field
- Softball: Cheryl Holt Field at Cathi Maynard Park
- Tennis: Governors Tennis Courts
- Track and field (indoor): (Does not have home competition facility)
- Track and field (outdoor): Morton Family Track at Fortera Stadium
- Volleyball: Winfield Dunn Center
