= Allen Field =

Baseball park at Morehead State University

- Interactive map of Allen Field
- Full name: John "Sonny" Allen Field
- Location: Stadium Drive, Morehead, Kentucky, USA
- Coordinates: 38.1928°N 83.426134°W
- Owner: Morehead State University
- Operator: Morehead State University
- Capacity: 1,200
- Surface: Natural grass
- Scoreboard: Electronic
- Field size: Left Field: 330 ft (100 m); Left-Center Field: 378 ft (115 m); Center Field: 398 ft (121 m); Right-Center Field: 335 ft (102 m); Right Field: 345 ft (105 m)

Construction
- Built: 1973
- Renovated: 1998, 2004, 2005

Tenant
- Morehead State Eagles baseball (NCAA DI OVC) (1973–present)

John "Sonny" Allen Field is a baseball stadium in Morehead, Kentucky, United States. It is home to the Morehead State Eagles baseball team of the NCAA Division I Ohio Valley Conference. It is named for former Morehead State baseball coach John "Sonny" Allen. Opened in 1973, the venue has a capacity of 1,200 spectators.

== Naming ==
The venue is named for John "Sonny" Allen, who coached the Morehead State baseball program in 1954–1959, 1966, and 1969–1975, a total of 14 seasons. Allen's career record was 226–137, and the program won conference championships in 1956, 1969, and 1973 under him. Allen also played basketball and served as the university's assistant athletic director.

== Features ==
Allen Field has an irregular layout, with the right field fence standing far closer to home plate than does the left field fence. As a result, the right field fence has been built much taller than the left field fence in an attempt to balance the irregular dimensions.

The field lies next to Phil Simms Stadium, the university's football venue.

=== Renovations ===
In 1998, stadium lighting was installed, thanks to a donation from baseball alumnus Willie Blair, who pitched in Major League Baseball. In 2004, the seating areas, locker rooms, and coaches' offices were improved. In 2005, the playing surface was renovated.

== See also ==
- List of NCAA Division I baseball venues
