= Bush Stadium at Averitt Express Baseball Complex =

College Baseball Stadium at Tennessee Tech University

- Interactive map of Bush Stadium at Averitt Express Baseball Complex
- Location: University Drive west of Willow Avenue, Cookeville, Tennessee, USA
- Coordinates: 36.177274°N 85.513407°W
- Owner: Tennessee Technological University
- Operator: Tennessee Technological University
- Capacity: 1,100
- Surface: Turf (added 2024)
- Scoreboard: Electronic
- Field size: Left Field - 329 feet Left-Center - 365 feet Center Field - 405 feet Right-Center - 360 feet Right Field - 330 feet

Construction
- Renovated: 1997

Tenant
- Tennessee Tech Golden Eagles baseball (OVC)

Howell Bush Stadium at Averitt Express Baseball Complex is a baseball venue in Cookeville, Tennessee, United States. It is home to the Tennessee Tech Golden Eagles baseball team of the NCAA Division I Southern Conference. It has a capacity of 1,100 spectators. It is named for former Tennessee Tech baseball and basketball player Howell Bush, whose 1997 donation allowed stadium lighting to be added to the facility. In the same year, the stadium was dedicated to him. Other features of the venue include dugouts, a batter's eye, a natural grass surface, and a locker room.

== See also ==
- List of NCAA Division I baseball venues
