= Earle Combs Stadium =

Baseball park at Eastern Kentucky University

Turkey Hughes Field at Earle Combs Stadium
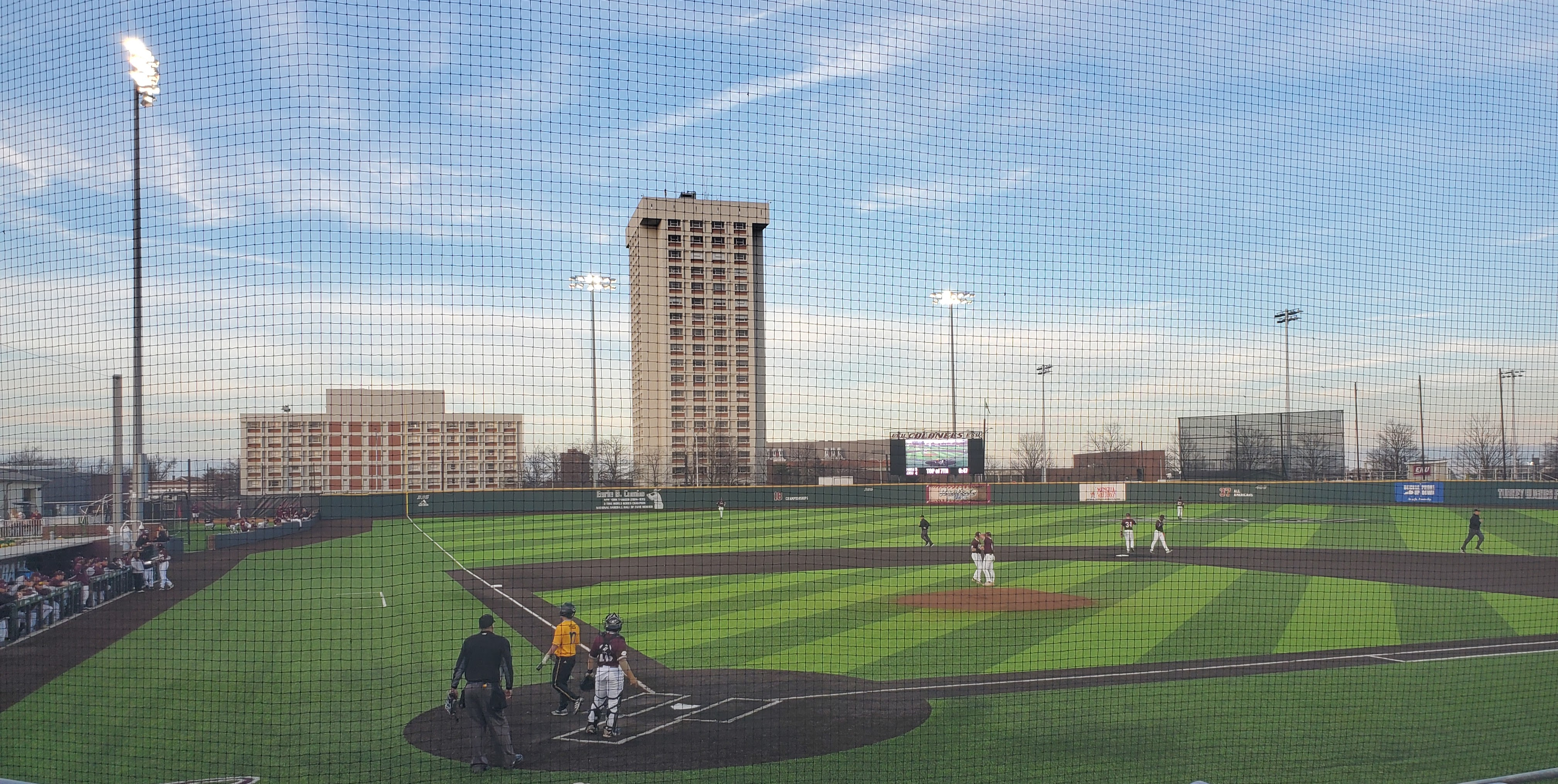
- Earle Combs Stadium
- Interactive map of Turkey Hughes Field at Earle Combs Stadium
- Former names: Turkey Hughes Field (1966-2017)
- Location: 521 Lancaster Ave. Richmond, Kentucky, USA
- Coordinates: 37.736046°N 84.300633°W
- Owner: Eastern Kentucky University
- Operator: Eastern Kentucky University
- Surface: Synthetic turf infield with natural grass outfield
- Field size: Left field: 330 feet (100 m); Center field: 415 feet (126 m); Right field: 340 feet (100 m)

Tenants
- Eastern Kentucky Colonels (NCAA DI United); Eastern Kentucky Club Baseball (NCBA)

Turkey Hughes Field at Earle Combs Stadium is a baseball stadium in Richmond, Kentucky, United States. It is home to the Eastern Kentucky Colonels baseball team of the NCAA Division I United Athletic Conference. The stadium opened in 1966 and was renovated in 2017, when it was renamed in honor of EKU alumnus and former New York Yankee Earle Combs. Previously, it was known simply as Turkey Hughes Field in honor of former Eastern Kentucky baseball coach Turkey Hughes.

In 2006, EKU's athletic department announced plans to completely rebuild the stadium with a $2 million initiative. In 2009, the university spent over $500,000 to install artificial turf, a batter's eye, and a brick backstop. Major renovations were made and completed in 2016.

== See also ==
- List of NCAA Division I baseball venues
