= Jim Case (baseball) =

American college baseball coach (born 1960)

Biographical details
- Born: January 28, 1960 (age 66)

Playing career
- 1978–1981: Louisiana Tech
- Position: Catcher

Coaching career (HC unless noted)
- 1982: Louisiana Tech (assistant)
- 1983–1986: Mississippi State (assistant)
- 1987–1997: UAB (assistant)
- 1998–2001: Mississippi State (assistant)
- 2002–2023: Jacksonville State

Head coaching record
- Overall: 667–560
- Tournaments: NCAA: 2–10

Accomplishments and honors

Championships
- 3× OVC Regular season (2005, 2008, 2019); 5× OVC Tournament (2004, 2006, 2010, 2014, 2019)

Awards
- 3× OVC Coach of the Year (2005, 2008, 2019)

Jim Case (born January 28, 1960) is an American college baseball coach who formerly served as head coach of the Jacksonville State Gamecocks baseball team. He held that position from 2002 until his retirement in 2023. He played at Louisiana Tech, earning all-conference honors as a catcher before serving as a student assistant coach for one season while completing his undergraduate degree. He then became an assistant at Mississippi State where he completed a master's degree before moving to UAB. After ten years, he returned to Mississippi State for a second stint before earning his first head coaching job at Jacksonville State.

== Head coaching record ==
Record table
Season	Team	Overall	Conference	Standing	Postseason
Jacksonville State Gamecocks (Atlantic Sun Conference) (2002–2003)
2002	Jacksonville State	23–31	9–20	T-10th	
2003	Jacksonville State	32–26	19–14	T-3rd	
Jacksonville State:			28-34		
Jacksonville State Gamecocks (Ohio Valley Conference) (2004–2021)
2004	Jacksonville State	31–29	16–11	3rd	NCAA Regional
2005	Jacksonville State	35–24	19–8	1st	
2006	Jacksonville State	35–24	19–8	2nd	NCAA Regional
2007	Jacksonville State	33–27	18–9		
2008	Jacksonville State	37–21	23–4	1st	
2009	Jacksonville State	31–26	10–13		
2010	Jacksonville State	32–26	15–8	2nd	NCAA Regional
2011	Jacksonville State	36–23	14–9		
2012	Jacksonville State	28–30	17–10	3rd	
2013	Jacksonville State	32–26	22–8	T-3rd	
2014	Jacksonville State	36–27	18–12	T-2nd	NCAA Regional
2015	Jacksonville State	30–27	15–14	7th	
2016	Jacksonville State	34–24	20–10	2nd	
2017	Jacksonville State	30–26	17–13	T-3rd	
2018	Jacksonville State	32–25	18–12	T-3rd	
2019	Jacksonville State	32–25	18–12	1st	NCAA Regional Final
2020	Jacksonville State	7–8	1–2		Season canceled due to COVID-19
2021	Jacksonville State	26–27	16–14	T-4th	
Jacksonville State:		633–526	296–177		
Jacksonville State Gamecocks (Atlantic Sun Conference) (2022–2023)
2022	Jacksonville State	27–28	19–11	3rd (West)	ASUN tournament
2023	Jacksonville State	27–30	18–12	4th	ASUN tournament
Jacksonville State:		667–560	37–23		
Total:		667–560			
National champion Postseason invitational champion Conference regular season champion Conference regular season and conference tournament champion Division regular season champion Division regular season and conference tournament champion Conference tournament champion

== See also ==
- List of current NCAA Division I baseball coaches
