= Raymond C. Hand Park =

Baseball venue in Clarksville, Tennessee

- Interactive map of Raymond C. Hand Park
- Former names: Governors Park (1970–1993)
- Location: Drane Street and Farris Drive, Clarksville, TN, United States
- Coordinates: 36.537442°N 87.355988°W
- Owner: Austin Peay State University
- Operator: Austin Peay State University
- Capacity: 1,000 (777 seated)
- Scoreboard: Electronic
- Field size: 319 ft. (LF); 373 ft. (LCF); 392 ft. (CF); 365 ft. (RCF); 327 ft. (RF)

Construction
- Built: 1970
- Renovated: 1993, 2001, 2008, 2020, 2022, 2023
- Expanded: 1993

Tenants
- Austin Peay Governors baseball (OVC/ASUN) (1970–present); Clarksville Coyotes (BSL/HL) (1996–97)

Raymond C. Hand Park is a baseball venue in Clarksville, Tennessee, United States. It is home to the Austin Peay Governors baseball team of the NCAA Division I United Athletic Conference. The facility has a seated capacity of 777 spectators, with a total capacity of over 1,000. The facility opened on March 23, 1970, and is named for Clarksville businessman Raymond C. Hand.

== History ==
The park opened on March 23, 1970, as Governors Park. In 1993, following renovations led by Clarksville businessman Charles Hand, the park was renamed Raymond C. Hand Park after Hand's father. The park has been the home of Austin Peay State's baseball program since its 1970 construction. As of the end of the 2010 season, the Governors have a 576-422-2 all-time record at Hand Park.

In 1996 and 1997, the independent professional Clarksville Coyotes of the Big South League (1996) and Heartland League (1997) played at the venue.

== Features and renovations ==
In 1993, a pair of $25,000 donations from the estate of Raymond C. Hand led to the installation of stadium lighting and construction of a new seating structure. During 1996 and 1997, when the Clarksville Coyotes shared Hand Park, the team collaborated with the university to add ticket booths, concession stands, and restrooms. In 2001, brick facing was added to the backstop and stadium entrance. In 2008, an eight-foot steel outfield fence was built, including a 12-foot batter's eye.

The field also features an irrigated natural grass surface.

Austin Peay has significantly improved the facility and its surroundings since the end of the 2019 season. Before the start of the 2020 season, Austin Peay baseball operations moved into a new facility with the completion of the Doug Downey Baseball Clubhouse and Operations Center that overlooks the park. Inside the new structure, student-athletes have access to an expansive locker room and a player lounge, while coaches have a separate area for their offices.

Alumnus and former Major League Baseball pitcher Shawn Kelley generously donated funds to complete the Kelley “K Club” inside the facility. This area serves as a team meeting room and converts into a premium seating area during Governors’ home baseball games.

Then before the 2022 season, Austin Peay again made improvements to the seating area to improve the fan experience and safety. The athletics department installed a new net in front of the seating area that stretches from dugout to dugout and is 30 feet high. In addition, it replaced the chairback seating to provide more space for fans to enjoy Governors baseball.

In 2023, Austin Peay changed the dimensions at Hand Park for the first time since moving into the facility in 1970. Most notably, the center field wall was moved inward 17 feet to 375 feet from home plate. Meanwhile, the right field corner was moved in 21 feet and is now 300 feet from home plate. Protecting the new center field dimension is a 30-foot tall wall – triple the height of the previous wall. Meanwhile, right field will become the home of a new student-centered seating area. Austin Peay installed new padding around the field’s perimeter in conjunction with the new dimensions.

In addition to the on-field changes, Austin Peay significantly improved the home bullpen during the 2023 preseason. The previous natural surface was replaced by artificial turf, providing Governors’ pitchers with a three-lane facility to work throughout the year.

== See also ==
- List of NCAA Division I baseball venues
