= Marion Stadium =

Stadium in Marion, Illinois

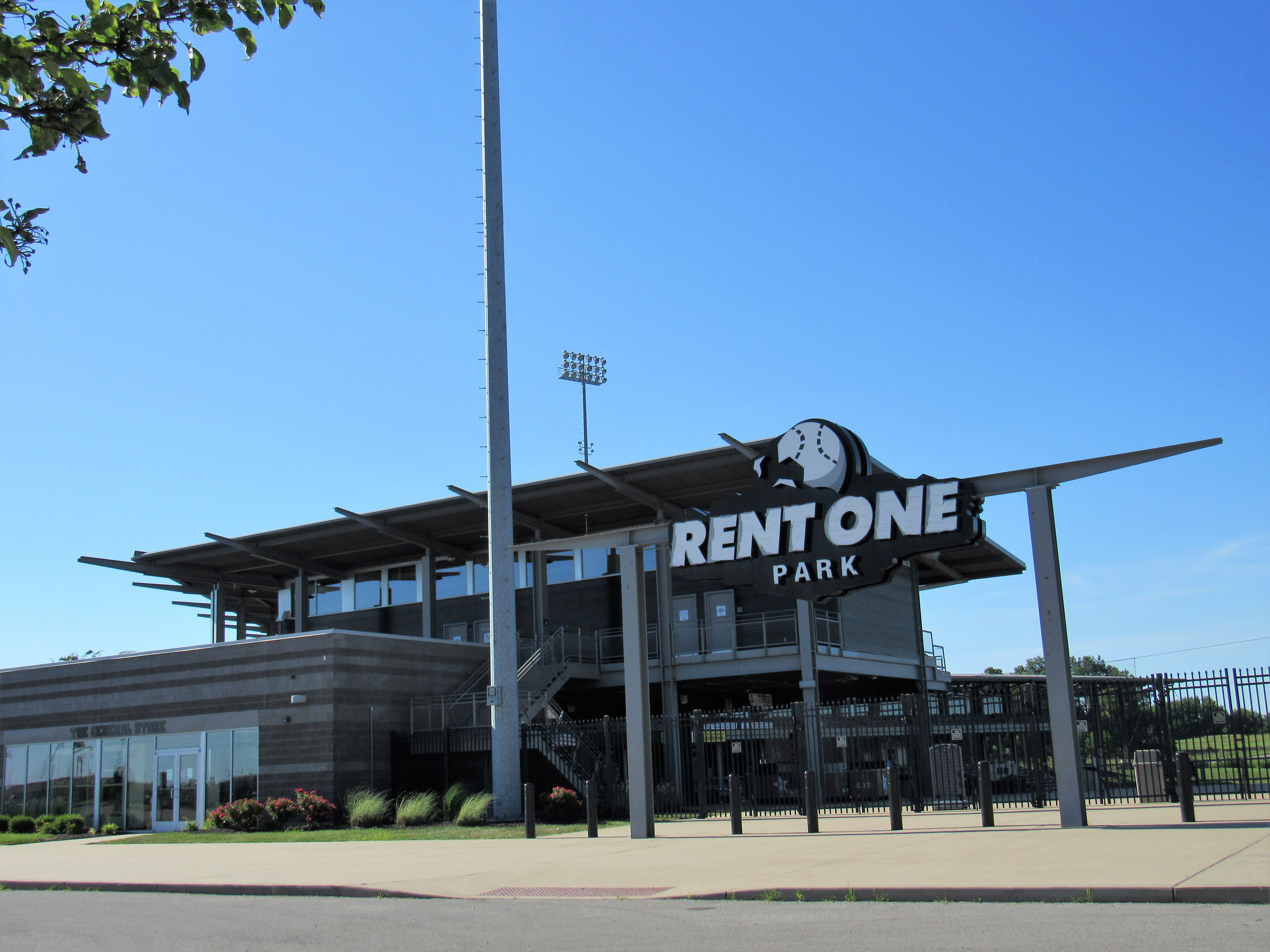

- Location within Illinois Location within the United States
- Interactive map of Marion Stadium
- Former names: Rent One Park (2007–2021)
- Address: 1000 Miners Drive; Marion, Illinois
- Coordinates: 37.745964°N 88.960397°W
- Capacity: 7,000
- Surface: Sportexe Turf synthetic field
- Field size: Left Field - 320; Left Center Field - 392; Center Field - 400; Right Center Field - 375; Right Field - 335

Construction
- Groundbreaking: 2006
- Opened: May 29, 2007

Tenants
- Southern Illinois Miners (FL) 2007–2021; Thrillville Thrillbillies (PL) 2023–present

Marion Stadium (formerly known as Rent One Park and Mtn. Dew Stadium) is a stadium in Marion, Illinois, that was completed in 2007. It is primarily used for baseball and was previously the home of the Southern Illinois Miners of the Frontier League from 2007 to 2021 before being purchased by the Thrillville Thrillbillies of the Prospect League in 2023.

The stadium has a contemporary, non-traditional look, devoid of the common red brick and green-painted steel common among ballparks around the United States.

One of the most unusual features of the stadium is the roof, which slopes down toward the field. As a result, foul balls hit by players can sometimes roll back down for spectators to catch.

The stadium is located roughly 120 miles southeast of St. Louis on Interstate 57. There are over 3,400 standard armchair ballpark seats including wider chair seating behind home plate. Down the left field line and in the outfield is lawn seating that can accommodate over 2,000 fans. The upper level features 14 luxury suites and an enclosed banquet area for approximately 200 persons.

Marion Stadium also contains an open-air entry plaza, home and visitor clubhouses, dedicated maintenance building, administrative offices, and team store. The scoreboard and video board are accompanied by 12 panels for advertisement on the right-field wall, beyond and above the bullpens.

The company that originally held the ballpark's naming rights, Rent One, is a rent-to-own retail store chain.

Following the folding of the Southern Illinois Miners baseball team in 2021, the venue was then purchased by Illinois Center Project, LLC. with the goal of converting the stadium into a multi-use venue.

In 2023, it was announced that Pepsi MidAmerica had purchased the naming rights for the ballpark. The newly renamed Mtn. Dew Park was set to be the crown jewel of Thrillville, a massive youth sports development to be built in the vicinity of the stadium. By the Thrillbillies home opener, the stadium's name was changed to Marion Stadium with no explanation or announcement from the team.

Since 2022, the stadium has been used for concerts, equestrian events, community gatherings, and more, along with local little league and high school baseball tournaments.

The Colt World Series is currently hosted at the stadium each summer after relocating from Lafayette, Indiana. In 2023, both the Great Lakes Valley Conference and the Ohio Valley Conference began holding their conference tournaments at the ballpark.

== First game ==
The first game in the park was played May 29, 2007. Over 6,200 fans saw the Southern Illinois Miners defeat the Evansville Otters 9–6.

== Records ==
On August 10, 2007, the Southern Illinois Miners broke the Frontier League regular season single game attendance record with 6,718 fans. In that game at Rent One Park, the Miners defeat the River City Rascals 8–0.

In their first season the Miners also broke the single season attendance record by hosting 259,392 fans, averaging over 5,000 fans per game.

== Other events ==
Because the stadium has Sportexe Turf instead of regular grass and dirt, events other than baseball can be held there throughout the year, including live concerts.

On June 6, 2018, the Ohio Valley Conference announced that Rent One Park would host the conference's postseason baseball tournament in 2019 and 2020, the first time that a postseason NCAA baseball tournament will be held in the Southern Illinois region since 1986.

Events and tenants
Preceded by Road Ranger Stadium	Host of the FL All-Star Game; Rent One Park; 2010	Succeeded by future

Events and tenants
Preceded by Choccolocco Park (Oxford	Host of the OVC postseason baseball tournament Rent One Park; 2019-2020	Succeeded by future
