= The Ballpark at Jackson =

Minor-league baseball stadium in US

- "The Big Chip"
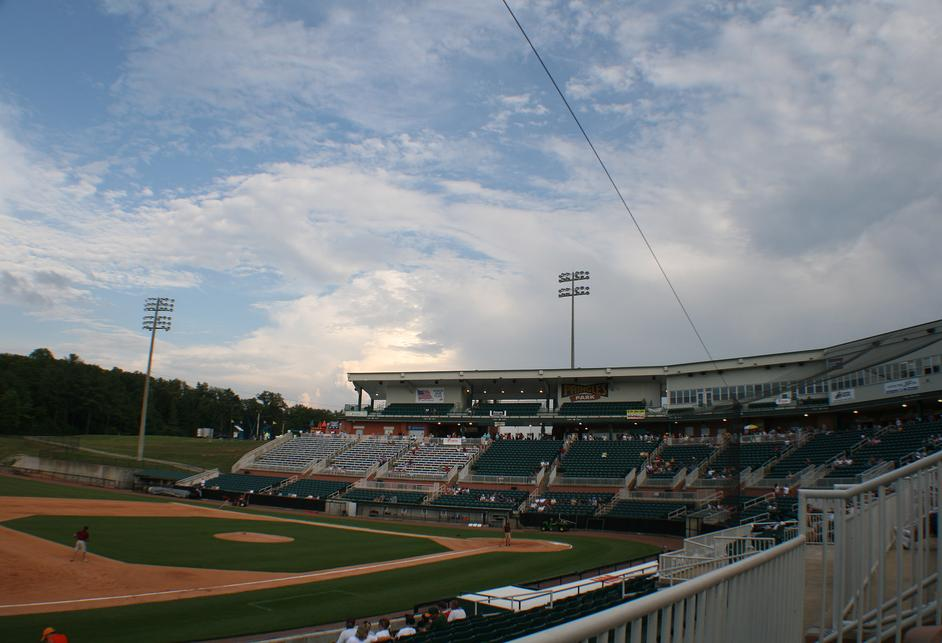
- Interactive map of The Ballpark at Jackson
- Former names: Pringles Park (1998–2012)
- Location: 4 Fun Place; Jackson, TN 38305
- Coordinates: 35°40′34.29″N 88°46′9.49″W
- Owner: The City of Jackson
- Operator: The City of Jackson
- Capacity: 6,000
- Surface: Grass
- Field size: Left field: 330 feet (100 m); Center field: 390 feet (120 m); Right field: 330 feet (100 m)

Construction
- Groundbreaking: 1997
- Opened: April 16, 1998
- Cost: $8 million ($15.8 million in 2025 dollars)
- Architect: Heery International
- General contractor: Henson Construction Services

Tenants
- Jackson Generals (SL) 1998–2020; Winnipeg Goldeyes (AA) 2021; Jackson Rockabillys (PL) 2023–present

The Ballpark at Jackson is a 6,000-seat minor league baseball stadium in Jackson, Tennessee, United States. It opened in 1998.

The Ballpark at Jackson was built by the municipal government of Jackson, Tennessee, and was the home of the Jackson Generals, formerly of the Southern League from 1998 to 2020. The stadium is northeast of downtown Jackson and is visible from Interstate 40.

It also hosts other events, including Pro Wrestling for the USA Championship Wrestling company.

== History ==
In conjunction with Major League Baseball's reorganization of the minor leagues after the 2020 season, the Jackson Generals were not invited to serve as any team's affiliate, effectively ending their run in the Southern League and affiliated baseball altogether. Major League Baseball has stated its intentions to assist cities like Jackson in joining independent baseball leagues; the team's lease require them to maintain a Class A, Double-A, or Triple-A affiliation to remain at The Ballpark at Jackson.

With no team lined up for 2021, the Generals agreed to operate The Ballpark at Jackson as a temporary home for the Winnipeg Goldeyes, an independent American Association team based in Winnipeg, Manitoba, Canada, which was displaced due to COVID-19 travel restrictions. However, Jackson Mayor Scott Conger notified the teams that the Generals lost their authority to manage the city-owned ballpark when they lost their affiliation with Minor League Baseball and that they were issued an eviction notice to leave the stadium after May 30, nine days after the Goldeyes' May 21 home opener. On June 1, the Goldeyes entered into a new license agreement with the city to continue use of the facility. The Generals and the City of Jackson went to an arbiter to determine which party had legal control of the stadium. The arbiter ruled in favor of the city, determining the team's lease to be invalid after the loss of its affiliation and requiring the team to vacate the ballpark.

In December 2021, the Prospect League announced that the Jackson Rockabillys will play home games at the ballpark for the 2023 season.

=== Naming rights ===
From its opening until November 1, 2012, The Ballpark at Jackson was known as Pringles Park, due to a naming rights agreement with Procter & Gamble, then-owners of the Pringles brand, which has a factory in Jackson. In 2012, the Pringles brand was sold to Kellogg's. Kellogg's opted not to renew the naming rights agreement, and the name was changed to The Ballpark at Jackson for the 2013 season.

=== Notable events ===
The Ballpark at Jackson has hosted the 1999 and 2011 Southern League All-Star Games and the 2010, 2011, 2012, and 2021 Ohio Valley Conference baseball tournament.
