= Murray State Racers baseball =

Murray State Racers
- 2026 Murray State Racers baseball team
- University: Murray State University
- Head coach: Dan Skirka (8th season)
- Conference: Missouri Valley Conference
- Location: Murray, Kentucky
- Home stadium: Reagan Field (capacity: 800)
- Nickname: Racers
- Colors: Navy blue and gold

College World Series appearances
- 2025

NCAA regional champions
- 2025

NCAA tournament appearances
- 1975, 1979, 2003, 2025

Conference tournament champions
- Ohio Valley: 1979, 2003; Missouri Valley: 2025

Conference regular season champions
- Ohio Valley: 1958, 1959, 1961, 1991; OVC Division: 1963, 1964, 1965, 1966, 1967, 1970, 1973, 1974, 1975, 1985; Missouri Valley: 2025

The Murray State Racers baseball team is the varsity intercollegiate athletic team of the Murray State University in Murray, Kentucky, United States. The team competes in the National Collegiate Athletic Association's Division I and is a member of the Missouri Valley Conference, having joined in 2022 after being a charter member of the Ohio Valley Conference.

== History ==
Murray State baseball reached national prominence in the 1970s under coach Johnny Reagan. The team won or shared 11 conference titles during his 36-year tenure from 1958 to 1993, which included 27 straight winning seasons and its first two NCAA Division I Baseball Championship appearances in 1975 and 1979. Murray State's 1975 team finished the season with a 40–9 record, was ranked No. 23 in Division I and led the nation in batting average (.332). The 1979 team (27–10–2), ranked 17th in Division I, came one win from advancing to the College World Series (now officially the Men's College World Series). Murray State's 1973 (19th) and 1974 (28th) teams also finished the season ranked in the NCAA poll.

Notable Murray State baseball alumni include Pat Jarvis, Jack Perconte, and Kirk Rueter. The team was known as the Thoroughbreds until 2014, even though the university had adopted the nickname of Racers.

In 2025, the Racers made it to their first Super Regional, upsetting teams in the Oxford Regional to make it to that point. From the Super Regional, they defeated the Duke Blue Devils in the series 2-1 to advance to the Men's College World Series for the first time in program history.

== NCAA Tournament ==
Murray State has played in the NCAA tournament four times.

Season	Event	Opponent	Result
1975	South Regional	LSU; Miami	L 2–7; L 7–8
1979	Starkville Regional	Tulane; New Orleans; Mississippi State; Mississippi State	W 5–3; W 16–15; L 6–8; L 8–18
2003	Hattiesburg Regional	Baylor; Southern Miss	L 6–7; L 0–18
2025	Oxford Regional	Ole Miss; Georgia Tech; Ole Miss; Ole Miss	W 9–6; W 13–11; L 8–19; W 12–11
2025	Durham Super Regional	Duke; Duke; Duke	L 4–7; W 19–9; W 5–4
2025	Men's College World Series	UCLA; Arkansas	L 4–6; L 0–3
