= Jacksonville State Gamecocks baseball =

Jacksonville State Gamecocks
- 2026 Jacksonville State Gamecocks baseball team
- Founded: 1948
- University: Jacksonville State University
- Head coach: Travis Creel (1st season)
- Conference: Conference USA
- Location: Jacksonville, AL
- Home stadium: Rudy Abbott Field (capacity: 1,500)
- Nickname: Gamecocks
- Colors: Red and white

College World Series champions
- NCAA Division II: 1990, 1991

College World Series runner-up
- Division II: 1983

College World Series appearances
- Division II: 1973, 1979, 1983, 1988, 1989, 1990, 1991

NCAA tournament appearances
- Division II; 1973, 1975, 1976, 1977, 1979, 1982, 1983, 1984, 1986, 1988, 1989, 1990, 1991 Division I 2004, 2006, 2010, 2014, 2019, 2026

Conference tournament champions
- OVC: 2006, 2010, 2014, 2019; CUSA: 2026

Conference regular season champions
- 2005, 2008, 2019, 2026

The Jacksonville State Gamecocks baseball team is a varsity intercollegiate athletic team of Jacksonville State University in Jacksonville, Alabama, United States. The team is a member of Conference USA, which is part of the National Collegiate Athletic Association's Division I. Previously the Gamecocks were members of the ASUN. The Gamecocks play home games at Rudy Abbott Field in Jacksonville, Alabama. They are coached by Travis Creel.

== Jacksonville State in the NCAA Tournament ==
Year	Record	Pct	Notes
2004	0–2	.000	Atlanta Regional
2006	0–2	.000	Tuscaloosa Regional
2010	0–2	.000	Auburn Regional
2014	0–2	.000	Oxford Regional
2019	2–2	.500	Oxford Regional
2026	2–2	.500	Hattiesburg Regional
Totals	4–12	.250	

== Year-by-year results ==
Record table
Season	Coach	Overall	Conference	Standing	Postseason
Records unavailable (–2001)
Atlantic Sun Conference (2002–2003)
2002	Jim Case	23–31			
2003	Jim Case	32–26	19–14		
Ohio Valley Conference (2004–2021)
2004	Jim Case	31–29	16–11		
2005	Jim Case	35–24	19–8		
2006	Jim Case	35–24	19–8		
2007	Jim Case	33–27	18–9		
2008	Jim Case	37–21	23–4		
2009	Jim Case	31–26	10–13		
2010	Jim Case	32–26	15–8		NCAA Regional
2011	Jim Case	36–23	14–9		
2012	Jim Case	28–30	17–10		
2013	Jim Case	32–26	22–8		
2014	Jim Case	36–27	18–12		NCAA Regional
2015	Jim Case	30–27	15–14		
2016	Jim Case	34–24	20–10		
2017	Jim Case	30–26	17–13		
2018	Jim Case	32–25	18–12	T-3rd	
2019	Jim Case	32–25	18–12	1st	NCAA Regional
2020	Jim Case	7–8	1–2		Season canceled due to COVID-19
2021	Jim Case	26–27	16–14	T-4th	
OVC:		557–445	269–158		
Atlantic Sun Conference (2022–2023)
2022	Jim Case	27–28	19–11	3rd (West)	ASUN tournament
2023	Jim Case	27–30	18–12	4th	ASUN tournament
ASUN:		54–58	37–23		
Conference USA (2024–present)
2024	Steve Bieser	18–34	5–19	9th	
2025	Steve Bieser	37–25	15–12	4th	
2026	Steve Bleiser	42–13	23–7	1st	NCAA Regional
2027	Travis Creel				
CUSA:		97–72	43-39		
Total:					
National champion Postseason invitational champion Conference regular season champion Conference regular season and conference tournament champion Division regular season champion Division regular season and conference tournament champion Conference tournament champion

== Major League Baseball ==
Jacksonville State has had 63 Major League Baseball draft selections since the draft began in 1965.

Gamecocks in the Major League Baseball Draft
Year	Player	Round	Team
1971	Thomas Cason	15	Red Sox
1972	Howard Echols	13	White Sox
1972	Perry Renfroe	8	Reds
1975	Roger Mayo	23	White Sox
1975	Evan Edge	16	Reds
1975	Ted Barnicle	1	Giants
1977	Larry Bowie	21	Padres
1977	Terry Abbott	15	Braves
1977	Stanley Treadway	14	Expos
1977	Venson Davis	2	Indians
1980	Dennis Cleveland	23	Astros
1980	Pete Leppert	5	Reds
1981	Jerome Coleman	26	Expos
1981	Chuck Davis	12	Red Sox
1981	Charles Fisher	9	Red Sox
1982	John Mortillaro	24	Braves
1983	Michael Blair	17	Dodgers
1983	Scott Whaley	15	Athletics
1984	Charlie Culberson	16	Giants
1984	Christopher Parker	13	Astros
1985	Jeff Hayward	18	Reds
1987	Jeff Atha	24	Expos
1987	Stewart Lee	18	Red Sox
1988	Mark Eskins	48	Braves
1988	Stewart Lee	18	Brewers
1988	Jim Smith	6	Royals
1989	Mac Seibert	36	Tigers
1989	Jim Dennison	15	Red Sox
1989	Todd Jones	1	Astros
1990	Scott Sprick	24	Orioles
1990	Todd Altaffer	23	White Sox
1990	Craig Holman	13	Blue Jays
1991	Tito Landrum	28	Dodgers
1991	Randy Belyeu	28	Cubs
1991	Craig Holman	22	Phillies
1991	Tim Van Egmond	17	Red Sox
1992	Jason Tidwell	14	Marlins
1993	Eric Ford	43	Red Sox
1994	Tony Shaver	25	Astros
1995	Joe Montgomery	42	Reds
1995	William Hodge	28	Royals
1996	John Clark	37	Reds
1999	Sammy Button	47	Indians
2000	Brandon Culp	26	Reds
2000	Bill White	3	Diamondbacks
2003	Evan Conley	34	Reds
2003	Kerri Fair	21	Astros
2003	Jessie Corn	6	Red Sox
2007	Garrett Bass	42	Nationals
2007	Donovan Hand	14	Brewers
2008	Justin King	30	Rangers
2009	Jason Zylstra	36	Twins
2009	Ben Tootle	3	Twins
2010	Alex Jones	27	Brewers
2010	Andrew Edge	24	Dodgers
2010	Daniel Adamson	20	Astros
2010	Todd Cunningham	2	Braves
2011	Ben Waldrip	40	Royals
2012	Daniel Watts	32	Diamondbacks
2012	Sam Eberle	25	Giants
2012	Ben Waldrip	10	Rockies
2013	Coty Blanchard	15	Rays
2014	Griff Gordon	27	Yankees

== See also ==
- List of NCAA Division I baseball programs
