= Eastern Kentucky Colonels baseball =

- 2026 Eastern Kentucky Colonels baseball team
- Founded: 1925; 101 years ago
- University: Eastern Kentucky University
- Head coach: Jan Weisberg (1st season)
- Conference: UAC
- Location: Richmond, Kentucky
- Home stadium: Turkey Hughes Field
- Nickname: Colonels
- Colors: Maroon and white

NCAA tournament appearances
- 1984, 1985, 1986, 1989

Conference regular season champions
- 2022

For information on all Eastern Kentucky University sports, see Eastern Kentucky Colonels

The Eastern Kentucky Colonels baseball team is a varsity intercollegiate athletic team of Eastern Kentucky University in Richmond, Kentucky, United States. The team is a member of United Athletic Conference, which is part of the National Collegiate Athletic Association's Division I. Eastern Kentucky's first baseball team was fielded in 1925. The team plays its home games at Turkey Hughes Field in Richmond, Kentucky. The Colonels are coached by Jan Weisberg.

== Eastern Kentucky in the NCAA Tournament ==
Year	Record	Pct	Notes
1984	1–2	.333	South II Regional
1985	1–2	.333	South II Regional
1986	0–2	.000	South I Regional
1989	0–2	.000	West I Regional
TOTALS	2–8	.200	

== Colonels in Major League Baseball ==
Since the Major League Baseball draft began in 1965, Eastern Kentucky has had 34 players selected.

== See also ==
- List of NCAA Division I baseball programs
