= Austin Peay Governors baseball =

- 2026 Austin Peay Governors baseball team
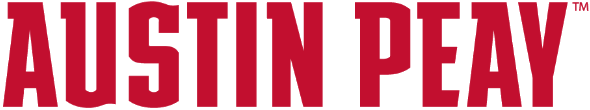
- Founded: 1931
- Overall record: 1,653–1,633–12
- University: Austin Peay State University
- Head coach: Roland Fanning (4th season)
- Conference: United Athletic Conference
- Location: Clarksville, Tennessee
- Home stadium: Raymond C. Hand Park (capacity: 777)
- Nickname: Governors
- Colors: Red and white

NCAA tournament appearances
- 1996, 2005, 2007, 2011, 2012, 2013

Conference tournament champions
- 1996, 2005, 2007, 2011, 2012, 2013

Conference regular season champions
- 1994, 1996, 2003, 2004, 2007, 2011, 2012, 2024, 2025

The Austin Peay Governors baseball team is the varsity intercollegiate athletic team of the Austin Peay State University in Clarksville, Tennessee, United States. The team competes in the National Collegiate Athletic Association's Division I and are members of the United Athletic Conference.

Austin Peay began play for baseball in 1931 as the fourth sport offered by the university. It stopped from 1940 to 1947 due to World War II. They played in the Volunteer State Athletic Conference until 1963, when they joined the NCAA and the Ohio Valley Conference. In 2023, they became a member of the Atlantic Sun Conference.

Austin Peay has made the NCAA Division I baseball tournament six times. They have gone 6-12 in NCAA tournament games, reaching the Regional Final twice.

== Major League Baseball (MLB) ==
Austin Peay has had nine players play in Major League Baseball (MLB).

Player	MLB tenure
A. J. Ellis	2008–2018
Ryne Harper	2019–2021
Shawn Kelley	2009–2019
Matt Reynolds	2010–2016
Tyler Rogers	2019–present
George Sherrill	2004–2012
Jimmy Stewart	1963–1973
Greg Tubbs	1993
Jamie Walker	1997–2009
