= Southeast Missouri State Redhawks baseball =

Southeast Missouri State Redhawks
- 2026 Southeast Missouri State Redhawks baseball team
- Founded: 1959; 67 years ago
- University: Southeast Missouri State University
- Head coach: Andy Sawyers (10th season)
- Conference: Ohio Valley Conference
- Location: Cape Girardeau, Missouri
- Home stadium: Capaha Field (capacity: 2,000)
- Nickname: Redhawks
- Colors: Red and black

College World Series appearances
- Division II: 1976

NCAA tournament appearances
- Division II: 1976, 1977, 1983; Division I: 1998, 2003, 2016, 2021, 2022, 2024

Conference tournament champions
- 1998, 2002, 2016, 2021, 2022, 2024

Conference regular season champions
- 1976, 1977, 1985, 1987; Ohio Valley:2002, 2014, 2015, 2016, 2021

The Southeast Missouri State Redhawks baseball team is the varsity intercollegiate athletic team of the Southeast Missouri State University in Cape Girardeau, Missouri, United States. The team competes in the National Collegiate Athletic Association's Division I and is a member of the Ohio Valley Conference.

== NCAA Tournament ==
Southeast Missouri State has played in the NCAA tournament six times.

Season	Region	Opponent	Result
1998	Midwest Regional	Wichita State; Georgia Tech	L 4–7; L 5–14
2002	Tuscaloosa Regional	Alabama; Florida Atlantic; Alabama	W 7–4; L 6–12; L 4–7
2016	Starkville Regional	Mississippi State; Louisiana Tech	L 5–9; L 4–9
2021	Oxford Regional	Ole Miss; Southern Miss	L 3–6; L 0–21
2022	Louisville Regional	Louisville; Oregon	L 2–7; L 6–18
2024	Fayetteville Regional	Arkansas; Louisiana Tech; Arkansas; Kansas State	L 9–17; W 9–3; W 6–3; L 2–7
