= Tennessee Tech Golden Eagles baseball =

Tennessee Tech Golden Eagles
- 2026 Tennessee Tech Golden Eagles baseball team
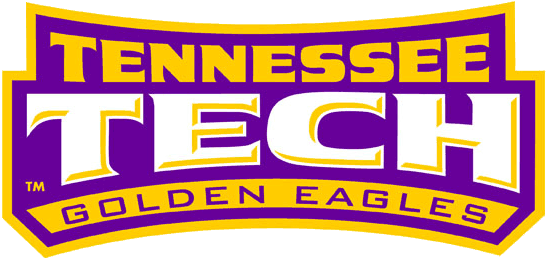
- Founded: 1949; 77 years ago
- University: Tennessee Technological University
- Head coach: Matt Bragga (20th season)
- Conference: SoCon
- Location: Cookeville, Tennessee
- Home stadium: Bush Stadium at Averitt Express Baseball Complex (capacity: 1,100)
- Nickname: Golden Eagles
- Colors: Purple and gold

NCAA regional champions
- 2018

NCAA tournament appearances
- 1956, 1997, 2001, 2009, 2017, 2018

Conference tournament champions
- 1997, 2001, 2009, 2017

Conference regular season champions
- 1949, 1955, 1956, 1970, 1988, 1997, 2010, 2013, 2017, 2018

The Tennessee Tech Golden Eagles baseball team, is a varsity intercollegiate athletic team of Tennessee Technological University in Cookeville, Tennessee, United States. The team is a member of the Southern Conference, which is part of the NCAA Division I. The team plays its home games at Bush Stadium at Averitt Express Baseball Complex.

== Tennessee Tech in the NCAA Tournament ==
Year	Record	Pct	Notes
1956	0–2	.000	District 3
1997	1-2	.333	Mideast Regional
2001	1-2	.333	Knoxville Regional
2009	1-2	.333	Clemson Regional
2017	1-2	.333	Tallahassee Regional
2018	5-3	.625	Austin Super Regional, Oxford Regional Champions
TOTALS	9–13	.409	

== See also ==
- List of NCAA Division I baseball programs
