= Morehead State Eagles baseball =

Morehead State Eagles
- 2026 Morehead State Eagles baseball team
- University: Morehead State University
- Head coach: Chris Rose (2nd season)
- Conference: Ohio Valley
- Location: Morehead, Kentucky
- Home stadium: Allen Field (capacity: 1,200)
- Nickname: Eagles
- Colors: Blue and gold

NCAA tournament appearances
- 1977, 1983, 2015, 2018

Conference tournament champions
- 1983, 1993, 2015, 2018

Conference regular season champions
- 2023

The Morehead State Eagles baseball team is a varsity intercollegiate athletic team of Morehead State University in Morehead, Kentucky, United States. The team is a member of the Ohio Valley Conference, which is part of the National Collegiate Athletic Association's Division I. The team plays its home games at Allen Field in Morehead, Kentucky. The Eagles are led by head coach Chris Rose.

== Major League Baseball ==
Morehead State has had 26 Major League Baseball draft selections since the draft began in 1965.

Eagles in the Major League Baseball Draft

Year	Player	Round	Team
1965	Joe Campbell	44	Mets
1967	William Craig	6	Braves
1967	Charles Merlo	57	Mets
1979	Larry Hamilton	19	Rangers
1979	Walt Terrell	15	Mets
1980	Walt Terrell	33	Rangers
1981	Glenn Jones	14	Giants
1983	Robert Shipp	29	Brewers
1983	Joe Mitchell	24	Brewers
1983	Stephen Heatherly	6	Angels
1984	Norm Brock	17	Astros
1984	Drew Hall	1	Cubs
1985	Robert Williams	18	Expos
1985	Jeremy Smith	2	Dodgers
1986	Willie Blair	11	Blue Jays
1988	Matt Michael	60	Yankees
1991	Brett Roberts	4	Twins
1992	Sean Hogan	24	Reds
1993	Sean Hogan	51	Cubs
1993	Jason Chandler	25	Reds
1994	Jay Sorg	15	Reds
1996	Brad Allison	41	Diamondbacks
1999	Rick Cercy	13	Rockies
1999	Jon Rauch	3	White Sox
2007	Henry Mabee	19	White Sox
2010	Drew Lee	12	White Sox

== Morehead State in the NCAA Tournament ==
Year	Record	Pct	Notes
1983	2–2	.500	Mideast Regional
2015	0–2	.000	Louisville Regional
2018	0–2	.000	Clemson Regional
TOTALS	2–6	.250	

== See also ==
- List of NCAA Division I baseball programs
