= 2021 NCAA Division I baseball season =

Baseball season

- Duration: February 19 – June 30, 2021
- Number of teams: 300
- Preseason No. 1: Florida (CB)

Tournament
- Duration: June 4–30, 2021
- Most conference bids: SEC (9)

College World Series
- Champions: Mississippi State (1st title)
- Runners-up: Vanderbilt (5th CWS Appearance)
- Winning coach: Chris Lemonis (1st title)
- MOP: Will Bednar

Seasons
- ← 2020 2022 →

The 2021 NCAA Division I baseball season play of college baseball in the United States organized by the National Collegiate Athletic Association (NCAA) at the Division I level, began on February 19, 2021. The season progressed through the regular season, many conference tournaments and championship series, and concluded with the 2021 NCAA Division I baseball tournament and 2021 College World Series. The College World Series, consisting of the eight remaining teams in the NCAA tournament and held annually in Omaha, Nebraska, at TD Ameritrade Park Omaha, ended on June 30, 2021. The Mississippi State Bulldogs won the tournament, and were named national champions.

Due to the ongoing COVID-19 pandemic, the start of the season was delayed one week, and some teams opted out of playing at all for the 2021 season. The Ivy League announced on February 18 that no conference competitions would take place, to include conference championships.

== Realignment ==
=== For 2021 season ===
- Four schools began transitions from NCAA Division II to Division I on July 1, 2020.
  - Bellarmine, already a D-I member in men's lacrosse, joined D-I for all other sports as a new member of the ASUN Conference.
  - Dixie State and Tarleton State joined the Western Athletic Conference (WAC).
  - UC San Diego, already a de facto D-I member in men's volleyball and women's water polo (which do not have D-II championship events) as an associate member of the Big West Conference, moved the rest of its athletic program to the Big West.
- Boise State dropped baseball when the season was canceled after the COVID-19 pandemic was declared leading to baseball's second elimination because the athletic department's budget was reduced by $3 million.
- Chicago State dropped baseball in June 2020, effective immediately.
- Furman announced in May 2020 that the Paladins baseball team would be terminated due to budget concerns during the COVID-19 pandemic.
- La Salle and North Carolina Central dropped baseball after this season.
- NJIT moved from the ASUN to the America East Conference.
- Cal State Bakersfield moved from the WAC to the Big West.

=== Future moves ===
The following schools changed conferences effective with the 2022 season:

- Five schools left the Southland Conference. Abilene Christian, Lamar, Sam Houston, and Stephen F. Austin joined the WAC, and Central Arkansas joined the ASUN.
- The Mid-Eastern Athletic Conference lost three members. Bethune–Cookman and Florida A&M joined the Southwestern Athletic Conference, and North Carolina A&T joined the Big South Conference.
- The Ohio Valley Conference lost Eastern Kentucky and Jacksonville State to the ASUN.
- Northern Colorado, a WAC baseball associate through the 2021 season, left for single-sport membership in the Summit League.
- St. Thomas, formerly of NCAA Division III's Minnesota Intercollegiate Athletic Conference, also joined the Summit League after successfully obtaining an NCAA waiver for a direct transition to D-I.

== Ballpark changes ==
- The 2021 season was the first for UConn at Elliot Ballpark, replacing J. O. Christian Field.
- Oklahoma State began play in O'Brate Stadium, replacing Allie P. Reynolds Stadium.
- Florida began play in Florida Ballpark, replacing Alfred A. McKethan Stadium.
- Omaha began play in Tal Anderson Field, replacing J. J. Isaacson Field at Seymour Smith Park.

== Season outlook ==
ESPN/USA Today Coaches
Ranking	Team
1	Florida (24)
2	UCLA (2)
3	Vanderbilt (4)
4	Texas Tech
5	Ole Miss
6	Louisville (1)
7	Mississippi State
8	Arkansas
9	LSU
10	Texas
11	TCU
12	NC State
13	UC Santa Barbara
14	Virginia
15	Miami (FL)
16	Tennessee
17	Georgia Tech
18	Oklahoma State
19	Arizona
20	South Carolina
21	Florida State
22	West Virginia
23	East Carolina
24	Georgia
25	Wake Forest

Collegiate Baseball News
Ranking	Team
1	Florida
2	Vanderbilt
3	UCLA
4	Texas Tech
5	Ole Miss
6	Miami (FL)
7	LSU
8	UCSB
9	Mississippi State
10	Arizona
11	Louisville
12	Georgia
13	NC State
14	Virginia
15	Arizona State
16	East Carolina
17	Oklahoma State
18	Michigan
19	TCU
20	Texas
21	South Carolina
22	Arkansas
23	Coastal Carolina
24	Dallas Baptist
25	Clemson

D1Baseball
Ranking	Team
1	Florida
2	UCLA
3	Texas Tech
4	Vanderbilt
5	Louisville
6	Ole Miss
7	Mississippi State
8	Arkansas
9	Texas
10	TCU
11	UCSB
12	LSU
13	NC State
14	West Virginia
15	Georgia Tech
16	Virginia
17	Wake Forest
18	South Carolina
19	Tennessee
20	Oklahoma State
21	Miami (FL)
22	Arizona
23	Auburn
24	Florida State
25	East Carolina

Baseball America
Ranking	Team
1	Florida
2	UCLA
3	Texas Tech
4	Ole Miss
5	Virginia
6	Vanderbilt
7	Louisville
8	Mississippi State
9	Florida State
10	LSU
11	Miami
12	Texas
13	TCU
14	Arkansas
15	Arizona
16	Duke
17	NC State
18	South Carolina
19	Tennessee
20	Michigan
21	UC Santa Barbara
22	Georgia Tech
23	Oklahoma
24	UCF
25	Alabama

NCBWA
Ranking	Team
1	Florida
2	UCLA
3	Vanderbilt
4	Texas Tech
5	Ole Miss
6	Louisville
7	Mississippi State
8	Arkansas
9	Texas
10	Miami (FL)
11	NC Stateт
12	TCUт
13	LSU
14	UC Santa Barbara
15	Virginia
16	Florida State
17	Arizona
18	Georgia Tech
19	East Carolina
20	Tennessee
21	West Virginia
22	Oklahoma
23	South Carolina
24	Georgia
25	Auburn

== Conference standings ==
2021 America East Conference baseball standings
	Conf.				Overall
Team	W		L	PCT	W		L	PCT
Division A
Albany ^{x}‍‍‍	20	–	18	.526	22	–	25	.468
Maine ‍‍‍	16	–	17	.485	22	–	22	.500
UMass Lowell ‍‍‍	18	–	20	.474	19	–	28	.404
Hartford ‍‍‍	18	–	20	.474	18	–	20	.474
Division B
Stony Brook ^{x}‍‍‍	25	–	10	.714	31	–	18	.633
NJIT ‍‍‡‍^{y}	23	–	17	.575	27	–	23	.540
Binghamton ‍‍‍	16	–	20	.444	16	–	20	.444
UMBC ‍‍‍	12	–	26	.316	17	–	26	.395
x – Division champion ‡ – Tournament champion y – Invited to the NCAA tournament As of June 5, 2021; Rankings from D1Baseball

2021 American Athletic Conference baseball standings
	Conf.				Overall
Team	W		L	PCT	W		L	PCT
No. 12 East Carolina ‍†‍‍^{y}	20	–	8	.714	44	–	17	.721
Tulane ‍‍‍	17	–	10	.630	31	–	24	.564
Wichita State ‍‍‍	18	–	13	.581	31	–	23	.574
Cincinnati ‍‍‍	18	–	14	.563	29	–	26	.527
UCF ‍‍‍	18	–	14	.563	31	–	30	.508
South Florida ‍‍‡‍^{y}	14	–	14	.500	31	–	30	.508
Houston ‍‍‍	7	–	21	.250	19	–	34	.358
Memphis ‍‍‍	7	–	25	.219	18	–	39	.316
† – Conference champion ‡ – Tournament champion y – Invited to the NCAA tournament As of June 13, 2021; Rankings from D1Baseball

2021 Atlantic 10 Conference baseball standings
	Conf.						Overall
Team	W		L		T	PCT	W		L		T	PCT
North
Rhode Island ^{x}‍‍‍	14	–	6	–	0	.700	28	–	26	–	1	.518
Saint Joseph's ‍‍‍	15	–	9	–	0	.625	21	–	19	–	0	.525
La Salle ‍‍‍	15	–	9	–	0	.625	32	–	21	–	0	.604
Fordham ‍‍‍	11	–	9	–	0	.550	24	–	19	–	0	.558
St. Bonaventure ‍‍‍	6	–	14	–	0	.300	7	–	24	–	0	.226
UMass ‍‍‍	3	–	16	–	0	.158	13	–	29	–	0	.310
South
VCU ^{x}‍‍‡‍^{y}	13	–	3	–	0	.813	38	–	16	–	0	.704
Dayton ‍‍‍	12	–	4	–	0	.750	25	–	27	–	0	.481
George Washington ‍‍‍	14	–	10	–	0	.583	26	–	19	–	0	.578
Davidson ‍‍‍	11	–	13	–	0	.458	27	–	24	–	0	.529
Saint Louis ‍‍‍	6	–	10	–	0	.375	17	–	31	–	0	.354
Richmond ‍‍‍	5	–	11	–	0	.313	19	–	17	–	0	.528
George Mason ‍‍‍	7	–	17	–	0	.292	14	–	29	–	0	.326
† – Conference champion ‡ – Tournament champion y – Invited to the NCAA tournament As of June 5, 2021; Rankings from D1Baseball

2021 Atlantic Coast Conference baseball standings
	Conf.				Overall
Team	W		L	PCT	W		L	PCT
Atlantic
No. 10 Notre Dame ^{x}‍‍‍^{y}	25	–	10	.714	34	–	13	.723
No. 4 NC State ‍‍‍^{y}	19	–	14	.576	37	–	19	.661
Florida State ‍‍‍^{y}	20	–	16	.556	31	–	24	.564
Louisville ‍‍‍	16	–	16	.500	28	–	22	.560
Clemson ‍‍‍	16	–	20	.444	25	–	27	.481
Wake Forest ‍‍‍	10	–	22	.313	20	–	27	.426
Boston College ‍‍‍	10	–	23	.303	21	–	28	.429
Coastal
Georgia Tech ^{x}‍‍‍^{y}	21	–	15	.583	31	–	25	.554
Miami (FL) ‍‍‍^{y}	20	–	15	.571	33	–	21	.611
Virginia ‍‍‍^{y}	18	–	18	.500	36	–	27	.571
North Carolina ‍‍‍^{y}	18	–	18	.500	28	–	27	.509
Duke ‍‍‡‍^{y}	16	–	17	.485	33	–	22	.600
Pittsburgh ‍‍‍	16	–	17	.485	23	–	20	.535
Virginia Tech ‍‍‍	16	–	20	.444	27	–	25	.519
x – Division champion ‡ – Tournament champion y – Invited to the NCAA tournament As of July 1, 2021; Rankings from D1Baseball

2021 ASUN Conference baseball standings
	Conf.				Overall
Team	W		L	PCT	W		L	PCT
North
Liberty ^{x}‍‍‍^{y}	19	–	2	.905	41	–	16	.719
Kennesaw State ‍‍‍	13	–	8	.619	29	–	22	.569
Lipscomb ‍‍‍	8	–	13	.381	18	–	29	.383
Bellarmine ‍‍‍	8	–	16	.333	13	–	36	.265
North Alabama ‍‍‍	6	–	15	.286	7	–	40	.149
South
Florida Gulf Coast ^{x}‍‍‍	12	–	6	.667	28	–	20	.583
North Florida ‍‍‍	11	–	7	.611	22	–	23	.489
Stetson ‍‍‍	10	–	8	.556	26	–	23	.531
Jacksonville ‍‍‡‍^{y}	3	–	15	.167	16	–	34	.320
x – Division champion ‡ – Tournament champion y – Invited to the NCAA tournament As of June 7, 2021; Rankings from D1Baseball

2021 Big East Conference baseball standings
	Conf.				Overall
Team	W		L	PCT	W		L	PCT
UConn ‍†‍‡‍^{y}	13	–	4	.765	34	–	19	.642
Creighton ‍‍‍	15	–	6	.714	24	–	15	.615
Seton Hall ‍‍‍	16	–	11	.593	23	–	25	.479
Xavier ‍‍‍	15	–	11	.577	28	–	26	.519
Villanova ‍‍‍	9	–	12	.429	21	–	14	.600
St. John's ‍‍‍	10	–	16	.385	19	–	21	.475
Butler ‍‍‍	8	–	13	.381	14	–	23	.378
Georgetown ‍‍‍	6	–	19	.240	6	–	25	.194
† – Conference champion ‡ – Tournament champion y – Invited to the NCAA tournament As of June 6, 2021; Rankings from D1Baseball

2021 Big South Conference baseball standings
	Conf.				Overall
Team	W		L	PCT	W		L	PCT
Campbell ‍†‍‍^{y}	28	–	9	.757	37	–	18	.673
USC Upstate ‍‍‍	28	–	12	.700	37	–	16	.698
Gardner–Webb ‍‍‍	27	–	13	.675	29	–	23	.558
Presbyterian ‍‍‡‍^{y}	18	–	16	.529	22	–	23	.489
Radford ‍‍‍	17	–	19	.472	23	–	23	.500
Charleston Southern ‍‍‍	18	–	22	.450	18	–	26	.409
Winthrop ‍‍‍	16	–	21	.432	19	–	27	.413
UNC Asheville ‍‍‍	14	–	26	.350	15	–	33	.313
High Point ‍‍‍	12	–	25	.324	14	–	31	.311
Longwood ‍‍‍	10	–	25	.286	17	–	32	.347
† – Conference champion ‡ – Tournament champion y – Invited to the NCAA tournament As of June 7, 2021; Rankings from D1Baseball

2021 Big Ten Conference baseball standings
	Conf.				Overall
Team	W		L	PCT	W		L	PCT
No. 19 Nebraska ‍†‍‍^{y}	31	–	12	.721	34	–	14	.708
No. 24 Maryland ‍‍‍^{y}	28	–	16	.636	30	–	18	.625
Michigan ‍‍‍^{y}	27	–	17	.614	27	–	19	.587
Indiana ‍‍‍	26	–	18	.591	26	–	18	.591
Iowa ‍‍‍	26	–	18	.591	26	–	18	.591
Ohio State ‍‍‍	22	–	20	.524	22	–	20	.524
Illinois ‍‍‍	22	–	22	.500	22	–	22	.500
Rutgers ‍‍‍	21	–	23	.477	21	–	23	.477
Penn State ‍‍‍	18	–	24	.429	18	–	24	.429
Northwestern ‍‍‍	15	–	21	.417	15	–	21	.417
Michigan State ‍‍‍	17	–	27	.386	17	–	27	.386
Purdue ‍‍‍	16	–	26	.381	16	–	26	.381
Minnesota ‍‍‍	6	–	31	.162	6	–	31	.162
† – Conference champion y – Invited to the NCAA tournament As of June 7, 2021; Rankings from D1Baseball

2021 Big 12 Conference baseball standings
	Conf.						Overall
Team	W		L		T	PCT	W		L		T	PCT
No. 3 Texas ‍†‍‍^{y}	17	–	7	–	0	.708	50	–	17	–	0	.746
No. 8 TCU ‍†‍‡‍^{y}	17	–	7	–	0	.708	41	–	19	–	0	.683
No. 9 Texas Tech ‍‍‍^{y}	14	–	10	–	0	.583	39	–	17	–	0	.696
No. 23 Oklahoma State ‍‍‍^{y}	12	–	12	–	0	.500	36	–	19	–	1	.652
Oklahoma ‍‍‍	11	–	13	–	0	.458	27	–	28	–	0	.491
Baylor ‍‍‍	11	–	13	–	0	.458	31	–	20	–	0	.608
Kansas State ‍‍‍	10	–	14	–	0	.417	34	–	23	–	0	.596
West Virginia ‍‍‍	8	–	16	–	0	.333	25	–	27	–	0	.481
Kansas ‍‍‍	8	–	16	–	0	.333	30	–	27	–	0	.526
† – Conference champion ‡ – Tournament champion y – Invited to the NCAA tournament As of June 26, 2021; Rankings from D1baseball

2021 Big West Conference baseball standings
	Conf.				Overall
Team	W		L	PCT	W		L	PCT
No. 17 UC Irvine ‍†‍‍^{y}	32	–	8	.800	43	–	18	.705
UC Santa Barbara ‍‍‍^{y}	29	–	11	.725	41	–	20	.672
Long Beach State ‍‍‍	26	–	14	.650	28	–	15	.651
Cal Poly ‍‍‍	21	–	19	.525	31	–	25	.554
Cal State Northridge ‍‍‍	21	–	19	.525	21	–	19	.525
UC San Diego ‍‍‍	21	–	19	.525	24	–	28	.462
Cal State Bakersfield ‍‍‍	17	–	19	.472	20	–	23	.465
Hawaii ‍‍‍	16	–	24	.400	24	–	26	.480
Cal State Fullerton ‍‍‍	13	–	23	.361	20	–	35	.364
UC Riverside ‍‍‍	12	–	28	.300	15	–	36	.294
UC Davis ‍‍‍	8	–	32	.200	14	–	43	.246
† – Conference champion y – Invited to the NCAA tournament As of June 7, 2021; Rankings from D1Baseball

2021 Colonial Athletic Association baseball standings
	Conf.				Overall
Team	W		L	PCT	W		L	PCT
North
Northeastern ^{x}‍‍‡‍^{y}	20	–	3	.870	36	–	12	.750
Towson ‍‍‍	11	–	12	.478	21	–	36	.368
Hofstra ‍‍‍	8	–	16	.333	17	–	22	.436
Delaware ‍‍‍	8	–	16	.333	12	–	22	.353
South
UNC Wilmington ^{x}‍‍‍	13	–	8	.619	32	–	22	.593
Elon ‍‍‍	10	–	8	.556	22	–	22	.500
College of Charleston ‍‍‍	12	–	12	.500	27	–	25	.519
William & Mary ‍‍‍	10	–	14	.417	14	–	29	.326
James Madison ‍‍‍	6	–	9	.400	11	–	17	.393
x – Division champion ‡ – Tournament champion y – Invited to the NCAA tournament As of June 5, 2021; Rankings from D1Baseball

2021 Conference USA baseball standings
	Conf.						Overall
Team	W		L		T	PCT	W		L		T	PCT
East
Charlotte ^{x}‍‍‍^{y}	24	–	8	–	0	.750	40	–	21	–	0	.656
No. 16 Old Dominion ‍‍‡‍^{y}	22	–	10	–	0	.688	44	–	16	–	0	.733
Florida Atlantic ‍‍‍	18	–	14	–	0	.563	32	–	25	–	0	.561
Western Kentucky ‍‍‍	15	–	17	–	0	.469	27	–	29	–	0	.482
FIU ‍‍‍	11	–	19	–	0	.367	20	–	31	–	0	.392
Marshall ‍‍‍	6	–	26	–	0	.188	10	–	35	–	0	.222
West
No. 22 Louisiana Tech ^{x}‍‍‍^{y}	22	–	8	–	0	.733	42	–	20	–	0	.677
No. 23 Southern Miss ‍‍‍^{y}	22	–	9	–	0	.710	40	–	21	–	0	.656
UTSA ‍‍‍	14	–	17	–	0	.452	22	–	26	–	0	.458
Middle Tennessee ‍‍‍	12	–	19	–	1	.391	24	–	29	–	1	.454
Rice ‍‍‍	11	–	20	–	1	.359	23	–	29	–	1	.443
UAB ‍‍‍	11	–	21	–	0	.344	18	–	36	–	0	.333
x – Division champion ‡ – Tournament champion y – Invited to the NCAA tournament As of June 7, 2021; Rankings from D1Baseball

2021 Horizon League baseball standings
	Conf.				Overall
Team	W		L	PCT	W		L	PCT
Wright State ‍†‍‡‍^{y}	28	–	4	.875	35	–	13	.729
UIC ‍‍‍	28	–	11	.718	30	–	18	.625
Youngstown State ‍‍‍	24	–	16	.600	32	–	24	.571
Milwaukee ‍‍‍	17	–	23	.425	22	–	33	.400
Oakland ‍‍‍	13	–	23	.361	19	–	28	.404
Northern Kentucky ‍‍‍	14	–	25	.359	17	–	31	.354
Purdue Fort Wayne ‍‍‍	7	–	29	.194	10	–	36	.217
† – Conference champion ‡ – Tournament champion y – Invited to the NCAA tournament As of June 5, 2021; Rankings from D1Baseball

2021 Metro Atlantic Athletic Conference baseball standings
	Conf.				Overall
Team	W		L	PCT	W		L	PCT
Fairfield ‍†‍‍^{y}	33	–	1	.971	38	–	5	.884
Monmouth ‍‍‍	22	–	10	.688	24	–	13	.649
Rider ‍‍‡‍^{y}	18	–	16	.529	23	–	18	.561
Canisius ‍‍‍	17	–	13	.567	20	–	16	.556
Marist ‍‍‍	17	–	9	.654	18	–	11	.621
Niagara ‍‍‍	17	–	15	.531	16	–	17	.485
Siena ‍‍‍	14	–	22	.389	15	–	24	.385
Manhattan ‍‍‍	12	–	22	.353	12	–	24	.333
Quinnipiac ‍‍‍	7	–	21	.250	7	–	21	.250
Saint Peter's ‍‍‍	4	–	24	.143	4	–	24	.143
Iona ‍‍‍	3	–	11	.214	3	–	11	.214
† – Conference champion ‡ – Tournament champion y – Invited to the NCAA tournament As of June 6, 2021; Rankings from D1Baseball

2021 Mid-American Conference baseball standings
	Conf.				Overall
Team	W		L	PCT	W		L	PCT
Central Michigan ‍†‍‍^{y}	31	–	9	.775	42	–	18	.700
Ball State ‍‍‍	29	–	11	.725	38	–	18	.679
Kent State ‍‍‍	23	–	17	.575	30	–	26	.536
Western Michigan ‍‍‍	23	–	17	.575	24	–	26	.480
Toledo ‍‍‍	21	–	19	.525	23	–	33	.411
Ohio ‍‍‍	19	–	21	.475	25	–	31	.446
Miami (OH) ‍‍‍	14	–	15	.483	21	–	22	.488
Bowling Green ‍‍‍	18	–	22	.450	20	–	30	.400
Eastern Michigan ‍‍‍	15	–	25	.375	21	–	30	.412
Northern Illinois ‍‍‍	15	–	25	.375	16	–	38	.296
Akron ‍‍‍	8	–	32	.200	15	–	36	.294
† – Conference champion y – Invited to the NCAA tournament As of June 7, 2021; Rankings from D1Baseball

2021 Mid-Eastern Athletic Conference baseball standings
	Conf.				Overall
Team	W		L	PCT	W		L	PCT
Northern Division
Norfolk State ^{x}‍‍‡‍^{y}	18	–	10	.643	25	–	28	.472
Delaware State ‍‍‍	13	–	18	.419	15	–	27	.357
Coppin State ‍‍‍	7	–	20	.259	10	–	29	.256
Southern Division
North Carolina Central ^{x}‍‍‍	17	–	11	.607	27	–	20	.574
Florida A&M ‍‍‍	15	–	13	.536	22	–	33	.400
North Carolina A&T ‍‍‍	17	–	15	.531	22	–	32	.407
x – Division champion ‡ – Tournament champion y – Invited to the NCAA tournament Florida A&M is ineligible for postseason play and conference championships due to NCAA sanctions. As of June 5, 2021; Rankings from D1Baseball

2021 Missouri Valley Conference baseball standings
	Conf.				Overall
Team	W		L	PCT	W		L	PCT
Dallas Baptist ‍‍‡‍^{y}	18	–	6	.750	41	–	16	.719
Indiana State ‍‍‍^{y}	14	–	10	.583	31	–	21	.596
Bradley ‍‍‍	12	–	10	.545	20	–	22	.476
Southern Illinois ‍‍‍	15	–	13	.536	40	–	20	.667
Missouri State ‍‍‍	11	–	13	.458	21	–	23	.477
Illinois State ‍‍‍	12	–	15	.444	23	–	34	.404
Evansville ‍‍‍	11	–	16	.407	28	–	27	.509
Valparaiso ‍‍‍	9	–	19	.321	16	–	35	.314
‡ – Tournament champion y – Invited to the NCAA tournament As of June 12, 2021; Rankings from D1Baseball

2021 Mountain West Conference baseball standings
	Conf.				Overall
Team	W		L	PCT	W		L	PCT
Nevada ‍†‍‍^{y}	22	–	9	.710	25	–	20	.556
San Diego State ‍‍‍	22	–	14	.611	30	–	16	.652
UNLV ‍‍‍	15	–	12	.556	20	–	13	.606
Air Force ‍‍‍	18	–	16	.529	26	–	22	.542
Fresno State ‍‍‍	16	–	18	.471	20	–	25	.444
New Mexico ‍‍‍	10	–	17	.370	16	–	25	.390
San Jose State ‍‍‍	2	–	19	.095	6	–	30	.167
† – Conference champion y – Invited to the NCAA tournament As of June 5, 2021; Rankings from D1Baseball

2021 Northeast Conference baseball standings
	Conf.						Overall
Team	W		L		T	PCT	W		L		T	PCT
Bryant ‍†‍‍	21	–	4	–	0	.840	27	–	14	–	1	.655
Central Connecticut ‍‍‡‍^{y}	21	–	9	–	0	.700	28	–	15	–	0	.651
Sacred Heart ‍‍‍	17	–	9	–	0	.654	23	–	25	–	0	.479
LIU ‍‍‍	18	–	11	–	0	.621	20	–	15	–	0	.571
Merrimack ‍‍‍	13	–	14	–	0	.481	19	–	22	–	0	.463
Fairleigh Dickinson ‍‍‍	8	–	22	–	0	.267	9	–	28	–	0	.243
Wagner ‍‍‍	7	–	22	–	0	.241	11	–	25	–	0	.306
Mount St. Mary's ‍‍‍	5	–	19	–	0	.208	9	–	28	–	0	.243
† – Conference champion ‡ – Tournament champion y – Invited to the NCAA tournament As of June 5, 2021; Rankings from D1Baseball

2021 Ohio Valley Conference baseball standings
	Conf.				Overall
Team	W		L	PCT	W		L	PCT
Southeast Missouri State ‍‍‡‍^{y}	17	–	10	.630	30	–	22	.577
Murray State ‍‍‍	18	–	12	.600	33	–	25	.569
Morehead State ‍‍‍	13	–	11	.542	24	–	23	.511
Jacksonville State ‍‍‍	16	–	14	.533	26	–	27	.491
Austin Peay ‍‍‍	16	–	14	.533	23	–	33	.411
Tennessee Tech ‍‍‍	15	–	15	.500	22	–	25	.468
Eastern Illinois ‍‍‍	14	–	16	.467	25	–	23	.521
Belmont ‍‍‍	14	–	16	.467	22	–	30	.423
SIU Edwardsville ‍‍‍	13	–	17	.433	23	–	27	.460
Eastern Kentucky ‍‍‍	13	–	17	.433	21	–	32	.396
UT Martin ‍‍‍	10	–	17	.370	19	–	29	.396
‡ – Tournament champion y – Invited to the NCAA tournament As of June 6, 2021; Rankings from D1Baseball

2021 Patriot League baseball standings
	Conf.				Overall
Team	W		L	PCT	W		L	PCT
North Division
Army ‍‍‡‍^{y}	15	–	10	.600	28	–	25	.528
Lafayette ‍‍‍	12	–	13	.480	14	–	17	.452
Holy Cross ‍‍‍	9	–	15	.375	10	–	20	.333
South Division
Lehigh ‍†‍‍	17	–	10	.630	24	–	19	.558
Navy ‍‍‍	11	–	12	.478	17	–	15	.531
Bucknell ‍‍‍	11	–	15	.423	11	–	22	.333
† – Conference champion ‡ – Tournament champion y – Invited to the NCAA tournament As of June 5, 2021; Rankings from D1Baseball

2021 Pac-12 Conference baseball standings
	Conf.				Overall
Team	W		L	PCT	W		L	PCT
No. 5 Arizona ‍†‍‍^{y}	21	–	9	.700	45	–	18	.714
No. 10 Oregon ‍‍‍^{y}	20	–	10	.667	39	–	16	.709
No. 7 Stanford ‍‍‍^{y}	17	–	10	.630	39	–	17	.696
No. 21 UCLA ‍‍‍^{y}	18	–	12	.600	37	–	20	.649
Arizona State ‍‍‍^{y}	16	–	14	.533	33	–	22	.600
Oregon State ‍‍‍^{y}	16	–	14	.533	37	–	24	.607
California ‍‍‍	15	–	15	.500	29	–	26	.527
Washington State ‍‍‍	13	–	17	.433	26	–	23	.531
USC ‍‍‍	13	–	17	.433	25	–	26	.490
Utah ‍‍‍	7	–	23	.233	17	–	33	.340
Washington ‍‍‍	6	–	21	.222	20	–	30	.400
† – Conference champion y – Invited to the NCAA tournament As of June 23, 2021; Rankings from D1Baseball

2021 Southeastern Conference baseball standings
	Conf.				Overall
Team	W		L	PCT	W		L	PCT
Eastern
No. 6 Tennessee ^{x}‍‍‍^{y}	20	–	10	.667	50	–	18	.735
No. 2 Vanderbilt ‍‍‍^{y}	19	–	10	.655	49	–	18	.731
Florida ‍‍‍^{y}	17	–	13	.567	38	–	22	.633
South Carolina ‍‍‍^{y}	16	–	14	.533	34	–	23	.596
Georgia ‍‍‍	13	–	17	.433	31	–	25	.554
Kentucky ‍‍‍	12	–	18	.400	29	–	23	.558
Missouri ‍‍‍	8	–	22	.267	15	–	36	.294
Western
No. 5 Arkansas ^{x}‍†‍‡‍^{y}	22	–	8	.733	50	–	13	.794
No. 1 Mississippi State ‍‍‍^{y}	20	–	10	.667	50	–	18	.735
No. 13 Ole Miss ‍‍‍^{y}	18	–	12	.600	45	–	22	.672
No. 18 LSU ‍‍‍^{y}	13	–	17	.433	38	–	25	.603
Alabama ‍‍‍^{y}	12	–	17	.414	32	–	26	.552
Auburn ‍‍‍	10	–	20	.333	25	–	27	.481
Texas A&M ‍‍‍	9	–	21	.300	29	–	27	.518
x – Division champion † – Conference champion ‡ – Tournament champion y – Invited to the NCAA tournament As of June 30, 2021; Rankings from D1Baseball

2021 Southern Conference baseball standings
	Conf.				Overall
Team	W		L	PCT	W		L	PCT
Blue
Samford ‍‍‡‍^{y}	20	–	10	.667	35	–	24	.593
East Tennessee State ‍‍‍	13	–	16	.448	24	–	25	.490
VMI ‍‍‍	13	–	17	.433	18	–	29	.383
UNC Greensboro ‍‍‍	12	–	18	.400	27	–	25	.519
Red
Wofford ‍‍‍	21	–	9	.700	36	–	21	.632
Mercer ‍‍‍	18	–	9	.667	35	–	22	.614
Western Carolina ‍‍‍	14	–	11	.560	28	–	21	.571
The Citadel ‍‍‍	4	–	25	.138	12	–	39	.235
‡ – Tournament champion y – Invited to the NCAA tournament As of June 5, 2021; Rankings from D1Baseball

2021 Southland Conference baseball standings
	Conf.				Overall
Team	W		L	PCT	W		L	PCT
Abilene Christian ‍†‍‍	25	–	13	.658	36	–	21	.632
Texas A&M–Corpus Christi ‍‍‍	20	–	14	.588	25	–	29	.463
New Orleans ‍‍‍	23	–	17	.575	29	–	28	.509
Sam Houston State ‍‍‍	20	–	15	.571	30	–	25	.545
Southeastern Louisiana ‍‍‍	22	–	17	.564	32	–	24	.571
Northwestern State ‍‍‍	20	–	16	.556	27	–	26	.509
McNeese State ‍‍‡‍^{y}	21	–	18	.538	32	–	30	.516
Lamar ‍‍‍	17	–	19	.472	25	–	23	.521
Central Arkansas ‍‍‍	18	–	22	.450	23	–	28	.451
Stephen F. Austin ‍‍‍	17	–	22	.436	20	–	31	.392
Incarnate Word ‍‍‍	17	–	23	.425	21	–	28	.429
Nicholls ‍‍‍	16	–	24	.400	21	–	34	.382
Houston Baptist ‍‍‍	11	–	27	.289	14	–	38	.269
† – Conference champion ‡ – Tournament champion y – Invited to the NCAA tournament As of June 6, 2021; Rankings from D1Baseball

2021 Southwestern Athletic Conference baseball standings
	Conf.				Overall
Team	W		L	PCT	W		L	PCT
East
Jackson State ^{x}‍‍‍	24	–	0	1.000	34	–	9	.791
Alabama State ‍‍‍	14	–	7	.667	23	–	19	.548
Alabama A&M ‍‍‍	9	–	13	.409	9	–	20	.310
Alcorn State ‍‍‍	6	–	16	.273	7	–	20	.259
Mississippi Valley State ‍‍‍	0	–	17	.000	0	–	20	.000
West
Prairie View A&M ^{x}‍‍‍	12	–	7	.632	14	–	18	.438
Grambling State ‍‍‍	12	–	9	.571	17	–	27	.386
Southern ‍‍‡‍^{y}	13	–	11	.542	20	–	29	.408
Texas Southern ‍‍‍	10	–	14	.417	12	–	35	.255
Arkansas–Pine Bluff ‍‍‍	8	–	14	.364	8	–	30	.211
x – Division champion ‡ – Tournament champion y – Invited to the NCAA tournament As of June 4, 2021; Rankings from Collegiate Baseball

2021 Summit League baseball standings
	Conf.				Overall
Team	W		L	PCT	W		L	PCT
Oral Roberts ‍†‍‍	19	–	7	.731	31	–	23	.574
North Dakota State ‍‍‡‍^{y}	20	–	11	.645	42	–	19	.689
Omaha ‍‍‍	14	–	12	.538	22	–	25	.468
South Dakota State ‍‍‍	9	–	19	.321	15	–	32	.319
Western Illinois ‍‍‍	7	–	20	.259	11	–	29	.275
† – Conference champion ‡ – Tournament champion y – Invited to the NCAA tournament As of June 6, 2021; Rankings from D1Baseball

2021 Sun Belt Conference baseball standings
	Conf.				Overall
Team	W		L	PCT	W		L	PCT
East Division
South Alabama ^{x}‍‍‡‍^{y}	15	–	9	.625	36	–	22	.621
Georgia Southern ‍‍‍	14	–	10	.583	34	–	23	.596
Troy ‍‍‍	13	–	11	.542	27	–	26	.509
Appalachian State ‍‍‍	11	–	10	.524	21	–	31	.404
Georgia State ‍‍‍	12	–	12	.500	18	–	37	.327
Coastal Carolina ‍‍‍	9	–	12	.429	27	–	24	.529
West Division
Louisiana ^{x}‍‍‍	13	–	11	.542	32	–	23	.582
UT Arlington ‍‍‍	13	–	11	.542	27	–	30	.474
Louisiana–Monroe ‍‍‍	11	–	13	.458	26	–	26	.500
Little Rock ‍‍‍	11	–	13	.458	21	–	30	.412
Arkansas State ‍‍‍	10	–	14	.417	19	–	30	.388
Texas State ‍‍‍	9	–	15	.375	21	–	36	.368
x – Division champion ‡ – Tournament champion y – Invited to the NCAA tournament As of June 7, 2021; Rankings from D1Baseball

2021 West Coast Conference baseball standings
	Conf.				Overall
Team	W		L	PCT	W		L	PCT
No. 25 Gonzaga ‍†‍‍^{y}	20	–	7	.741	34	–	19	.642
San Diego ‍‍‍	19	–	8	.704	33	–	12	.733
San Francisco ‍‍‍	16	–	11	.593	25	–	28	.472
BYU ‍‍‍	15	–	12	.556	23	–	27	.460
Portland ‍‍‍	14	–	13	.519	24	–	26	.480
Loyola Marymount ‍‍‍	13	–	14	.481	20	–	29	.408
Pepperdine ‍‍‍	12	–	15	.444	20	–	25	.444
Saint Mary's ‍‍‍	11	–	16	.407	25	–	26	.490
Santa Clara ‍‍‍	8	–	19	.296	18	–	33	.353
Pacific ‍‍‍	7	–	20	.259	17	–	34	.333
† – Conference champion y – Invited to the NCAA tournament As of June 6, 2021; Rankings from D1Baseball

2021 Western Athletic Conference baseball standings
	Conf.						Overall
Team	W		L		T	PCT	W		L		T	PCT
California Baptist ‍†‍‍	29	–	7	–	0	.806	40	–	16	–	0	.714
Grand Canyon ‍‍‡‍^{y}	29	–	7	–	0	.806	39	–	21	–	1	.648
Sacramento State ‍‍‍	22	–	14	–	0	.611	35	–	22	–	0	.614
Dixie State ‍‍‍	21	–	15	–	0	.583	24	–	32	–	0	.429
UTRGV ‍‍‍	20	–	15	–	0	.571	32	–	26	–	0	.552
New Mexico State ‍‍‍	16	–	20	–	0	.444	20	–	34	–	0	.370
Tarleton State ‍‍‍	13	–	23	–	0	.361	20	–	35	–	0	.364
Seattle ‍‍‍	10	–	22	–	0	.313	18	–	33	–	0	.353
Northern Colorado ‍‍‍	7	–	24	–	0	.226	11	–	36	–	0	.234
Utah Valley ‍‍‍	8	–	28	–	0	.222	10	–	47	–	0	.175
† – Conference champion ‡ – Tournament champion y – Invited to the NCAA tournament As of June 5, 2021; Rankings from D1Baseball

=== Conference winners and tournaments ===
Of the 32 Division I all-sports athletic conferences, 31 sponsor baseball, with the Big Sky Conference the only exception. All but one of these conferences played in the 2021 season; the Ivy League opted out of the season due to COVID-19 concerns. Several conferences canceled or modified their conference tournaments for 2021, with the Big Ten, Mid-American, Mountain West and West Coast joining the Big West and Pac-12 in forgoing a tournament to end the regular season. For those conferences holding a tournament, the teams in each conference that won their regular season title were given the top seeds in each tournament. The winners of these tournaments received automatic invitations to the 2021 NCAA Division I baseball tournament. Conferences that do not hold a tournament award their automatic bids to the regular-season champion.

Conference	Regular season winner	Conference Player of the Year	Conference Pitcher of the Year	Conference Coach of the Year	Conference tournament	Tournament venue (city)	Tournament winner
America East Conference	Division A – Albany; Division B – Stony Brook	John Thrasher, Hartford	Nicholas Sinacola, Maine	Jon Mueller, Albany	2021 America East Conference baseball tournament	Joe Nathan Field • Stony Brook, NY	NJIT
American Athletic Conference	East Carolina	Connor Norby, East Carolina	Gavin Williams, East Carolina	Cliff Godwin, East Carolina	2021 American Athletic Conference baseball tournament	BayCare Ballpark • Clearwater, FL	South Florida
ASUN Conference	Division 1 – Liberty; Division 2 – Florida Gulf Coast	Alex Kachler, North Florida	Trevor Delaite, Liberty	Scott Jackson, Liberty	2021 ASUN Conference baseball tournament	Division round: Campus sites Semifinals and final: Jacksonville, FL	Jacksonville
Atlantic 10 Conference	North – Rhode Island; South – VCU	Tyler Locklear, VCU	Matt Mikulski, Fordham	David Miller, La Salle	2021 Atlantic 10 Conference baseball tournament	The Diamond • Richmond, VA	VCU
Atlantic Coast Conference	Atlantic – Notre Dame; Coastal – Georgia Tech	Matheu Nelson, Florida State	Parker Messick, Florida State	Link Jarrett, Notre Dame	2021 Atlantic Coast Conference baseball tournament	Truist Field • Charlotte, NC	Duke
Big 12 Conference	Texas/TCU	Jace Jung, Texas Tech	Ty Madden, Texas	David Pierce, Texas	2021 Big 12 Conference baseball tournament	Chickasaw Bricktown Ballpark • Oklahoma City, OK	TCU
Big East Conference	UConn	Kyler Fedko, UConn	Dylan Tebrake, Creighton	Jim Penders, UConn	2021 Big East Conference baseball tournament	Prasco Park • Mason, OH	UConn
Big South Conference	Campbell	Zach Neto, Campbell	Jordan Marks, USC Upstate	Jim Chester, Gardner–Webb & Justin Haire, Campbell	2021 Big South Conference baseball tournament	Segra Stadium • Fayetteville, NC	Presbyterian
Big Ten Conference	Nebraska	Spencer Schwellenbach, Nebraska	Trenton Wallace, Iowa	Will Bolt, Nebraska	No tournament, regular season champion earns auto bid		
Big West Conference	UC Irvine	Mike Peabody, UC Irvinie & Brooks Lee, Cal Poly	Johnathan Lavallee, Long Beach State & Rodney Boone, UC Santa Barbara	Ben Orloff, UC Irvine	No tournament, regular season champion earns auto bid		
Colonial Athletic Association	Northeastern	Jared Dupere, Northeastern	Landen Roupp, UNC Wilmington	Mike Glavine, Northeastern	2021 Colonial Athletic Association baseball tournament	Brooks Field • Wilmington, NC	Northeastern
Conference USA	East – Charlotte; West –Louisiana Tech	Austin Knight, Charlotte	Walker Powell, Southern Miss	Robert Woodard, Charlotte	2021 Conference USA baseball tournament	J. C. Love Field at Pat Patterson Park • Ruston, LA	Old Dominion
Horizon League	Wright State	Quincy Hamilton, Wright State	Collin Floyd, Youngstown State	Alex Sogard, Wright State	2021 Horizon League baseball tournament	Regular season champion home stadium	Wright State
~~Ivy League~~	No conference competition for 2021 season.						
Metro Atlantic Athletic Conference	Fairfield	Mike Caruso, Fairfield	Rob Hensey, Monmouth	Bill Currier, Fairfield	2021 Metro Atlantic Athletic Conference baseball tournament	Richmond County Bank Ballpark • Staten Island, NY	Rider
Mid-American Conference	Central Michigan	Chris Meyers, Toledo	Andrew Taylor, Central Michigan	Jordan Bischel, Central Michigan	No tournament, regular season champion earns auto bid		
Mid-Eastern Athletic Conference	Northern – Norfolk State; Southern – North Carolina Central	Danny Hosley, Norfolk State	Ryan Miller, North Carolina Central	Jim Koerner, North Carolina Central	2021 Mid–Eastern Athletic Conference baseball tournament	Marty L. Miller Field • Norfolk, VA	Norfolk State
Missouri Valley Conference	Dallas Baptist	Jackson Glenn, Dallas Baptist	Geremy Guerrero, Indiana State	Dan Heefner, Dallas Baptist	2021 Missouri Valley Conference baseball tournament	Itchy Jones Stadium • Carbondale, IL	Dallas Baptist
Mountain West Conference	Nevada	Dillan Shrum, Nevada	Justin Armbruester, New Mexico	T. J. Bruce, Nevada	No tournament, regular season champion earns auto bid		
Northeast Conference	Bryant	Liam McGill, Bryant	Tyler Mattison, Bryant	Ryan Klosterman, Bryant	2021 Northeast Conference baseball tournament	Dodd Stadium • Norwich, CT	Central Connecticut
Ohio Valley Conference	Southeast Missouri State	Trey Sweeney, Eastern Illinois	Dylan Dodd, Southeast Missouri State	Andy Sawyers, Southeast Missouri State	2021 Ohio Valley Conference baseball tournament	The Ballpark at Jackson • Jackson, TN	Southeast Missouri State
Pac-12 Conference	Arizona	Aaron Zavala, Oregon	Brendan Beck, Stanford	Jay Johnson, Arizona	No tournament, regular season champion earns auto bid		
Patriot League	Lehigh	Casey Rother, Lehigh	Mason Black, Lehigh	Sean Leary, Lehigh	2021 Patriot League baseball tournament	Campus Sites	Army
Southeastern Conference	Eastern – Tennessee; Western – Arkansas	Tanner Allen, Mississippi State	Kevin Kopps, Arkansas	Dave Van Horn, Arkansas	2021 Southeastern Conference baseball tournament	Hoover Metropolitan Stadium • Hoover, AL	Arkansas
Southern Conference	Blue – Samford; Red – Wofford	Colin Davis, Wofford	Elliot Carney, Wofford	Todd Interdonato, Wofford	2021 Southern Conference baseball tournament	Fluor Field at the West End • Greenville, SC	Samford
Southland Conference	Abilene Christian	Colton Cowser, Sam Houston State	Will Dion, McNeese State	Rick McCarty, Abilene Christian	2021 Southland Conference baseball tournament	Pat Kenelly Diamond at Alumni Field • Hammond, LA	McNeese State
Southwestern Athletic Conference	East – Jackson State; West – Prairie View A&M	Ty Hill, Jackson State	Anthony Becerra, Jackson State	Omar Johnson, Jackson State	2021 Southwestern Athletic Conference baseball tournament	Smith–Wills Stadium • Jackson, MS	Southern
Summit League	Oral Roberts	Bennett Hostetler, North Dakota State	Isaac Coffey, Oral Roberts	Ryan Folmar, Oral Roberts	2021 Summit League baseball tournament	Tal Anderson Field • Omaha, NE	North Dakota State
Sun Belt Conference	East – South Alabama; West – Louisiana/UT Arlington	Mason McWhorter, Georgia Southern	Hayden Arnold, Little Rock	Mark Calvi, South Alabama	2021 Sun Belt Conference baseball tournament	Riverwalk Stadium • Montgomery, AL	South Alabama
West Coast Conference	Gonzaga	Thomas Luevano, San Diego	Alek Jacob, Gonzaga	Mark Machtolf, Gonzaga	No tournament, regular season champion earns auto bid		
Western Athletic Conference	California Baptist/Grand Canyon	Damon Keith, California Baptist	Pierson Ohl, Grand Canyon	Andy Stankiewicz, Grand Canyon	2021 Western Athletic Conference baseball tournament	Hohokam Stadium • Mesa, AZ	Grand Canyon

== Coaching changes ==
This table lists programs that changed head coaches at any point from the first day of the 2021 season until the day before the first day of the 2022 season.

Team	Former coach	Interim coach	New coach	Reason
Central Arkansas	Allen Gum	Nick Harlan		Retired
Chicago State	Steve Joslyn	N/A		Program discontinued
Furman	Brett Harker	N/A		Program discontinued
Rice	Matt Bragga			
Texas A&M	Rob Childress			
