= Dan Bertolini =

American college baseball coach (born 1985)

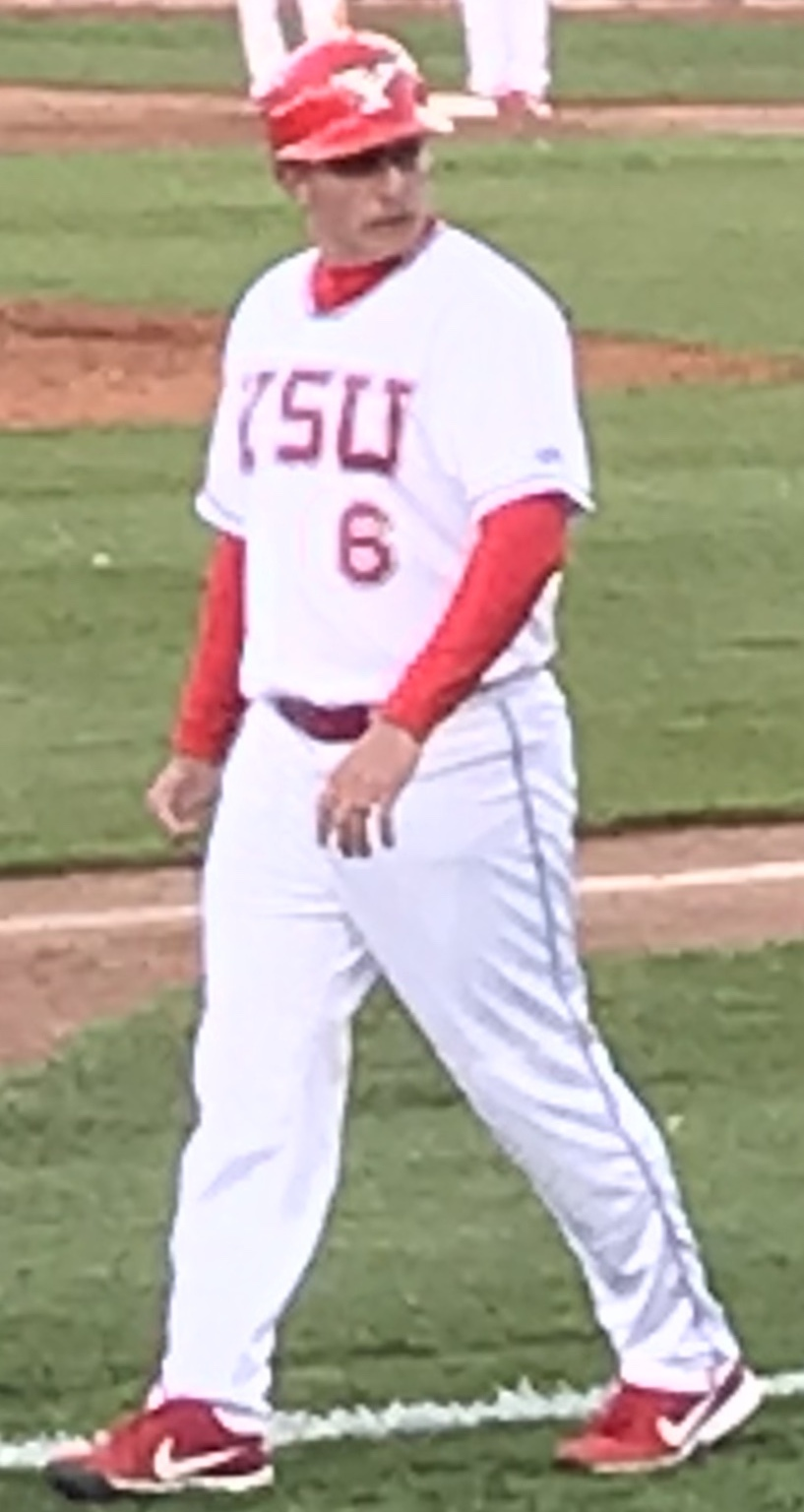
- Bertolini in 2019

Current position
- Title: Assistant coach
- Team: Kent State
- Conference: MAC

Biographical details
- Born: October 16, 1985 (age 41)

Playing career
- 2005–2008: Mercyhurst
- 2008: Midwest Sliders
- Position: Shortstop

Coaching career (HC unless noted)
- 2009–2016: Mercyhurst North East
- 2017–2024: Youngstown State
- 2025–present: Kent State (asst.)

Head coaching record
- Overall: 141–266 (.346) (NCAA); 229–83 (.734) (NJCAA)
- Tournaments: Horizon: 3–8; NCAA: 0–0

Accomplishments and honors

Awards
- Honorable Mention All-GLIAC (2007); Second Team All-GLIAC (2008)

Daniel Bertolini (October 16, 1985) is an American baseball coach and former shortstop, who is an assistant coach for the Kent State Golden Flashes. From 2017 to 2024 he was the head baseball coach at Youngstown State. He played college baseball at Mercyhurst University for coach Joe Spano from 2005 to 2008 before playing 1 season in the Frontier League in 2008. He was the head coach at Mercyhurst North East (2009–2016).

== Playing career ==
Bertolini attended Poland Seminary High School in Poland, Ohio. Bertolini played for the school's varsity baseball and basketball teams for three years. Bertolini then enrolled at Mercyhurst University, to play college baseball for the Mercyhurst Lakers baseball team.

As a freshman at Mercyhurst University in 2005, Bertolini had a .268 batting average, a .333 on-base percentage (OBP) and a .307 SLG.

As a sophomore in 2006, Bertolini batted .269 with a .340 SLG, 2 home run, and 24 RBIs.

In the 2007 season as a junior, Bertolini hit 1 home run, 11 doubles and had 31 RBIs. He was named Honorable Mentional All-Great Lakes Intercollegiate Athletic Conference,

Bertolini had another solid season as a senior in 2008, hitting 7 doubles, 1 home run, 18 RBIs, a .319 batting average and slugged .380. He was named Second Team All-GLIAC.

Upon his graduation, Bertolini signed with the Midwest Sliders of the Frontier League. Bertolini hit just .186 in 24 games for the Sliders.

== Coaching career ==
Bertolini was named the head baseball coach of Mercyhurst North East in 2009. During the 2013–2014 season, Bertolini spent the season as an assistant men's basketball coach for the Saints. In April 2015, Bertolini earned his 200th career victory for the Saints. Bertolini had a career-record of 229–185 and winning National Junior College Athletic Association Division II Region 3 titles in 2012 and 2014.

On June 21, 2016, Bertolini was named the 9th head coach in Youngstown State Penguins baseball history.

== Head coaching record ==
Record table
Season	Team	Overall	Conference	Standing	Postseason
Mercyhurst North East Saints (Western New York Athletic Conference) (2009–2016)
2014	Mercyhurst North East	31–10	11–1		
2015	Mercyhurst North East	27–21	9–3		
2016	Mercyhurst North East	30–19	1–4		
Mercyhurst North East:		229–83 (NJCAA)	0–0		
Youngstown State Penguins (Horizon League) (2017–2024)
2017	Youngstown State	15–40	9–21	7th	
2018	Youngstown State	18–38	10–19	5th	Horizon League Tournament
2019	Youngstown State	13–41	7–20	6th	Horizon League Tournament
2020	Youngstown State	7–7	0–0		Season canceled due to COVID-19
2021	Youngstown State	32–24	24–16	3rd	Horizon League Tournament
2022	Youngstown State	21–36	12–16	5th	Horizon League Tournament
2023	Youngstown State	19–36	13–16	4th	Horizon League Tournament
2024	Youngstown State	16–44	9–21	6th	Horizon League Tournament
Youngstown State:		141–266 (.346)	84–129 (.394)		
Total:		141–266 (.346)			
National champion Postseason invitational champion Conference regular season champion Conference regular season and conference tournament champion Division regular season champion Division regular season and conference tournament champion Conference tournament champion

== See also ==
- List of current NCAA Division I baseball coaches
