= 2021 Youngstown State Penguins baseball team =

American college baseball season

2021 Youngstown State Penguins baseball
- Conference: Horizon League
- Record: 32–24 (24–16 Horizon)
- Head coach: Dan Bertolini (5th season)
- Assistant coach: Eric Bunnell (3rd season)
- Hitting coach: Eric Smith (5th season)
- Pitching coach: Shane Davis (3rd season)
- Home stadium: Eastwood Field

2021 Horizon League baseball standings
	Conf.				Overall
Team	W		L	PCT	W		L	PCT
Wright State ‍†‍‡‍^{y}	28	–	4	.875	35	–	13	.729
UIC ‍‍‍	28	–	11	.718	30	–	18	.625
Youngstown State ‍‍‍	24	–	16	.600	32	–	24	.571
Milwaukee ‍‍‍	17	–	23	.425	22	–	33	.400
Oakland ‍‍‍	13	–	23	.361	19	–	28	.404
Northern Kentucky ‍‍‍	14	–	25	.359	17	–	31	.354
Purdue Fort Wayne ‍‍‍	7	–	29	.194	10	–	36	.217
† – Conference champion ‡ – Tournament champion y – Invited to the NCAA tournament As of June 5, 2021; Rankings from D1Baseball

The 2021 Youngstown State Penguins baseball team was a baseball team that represented Youngstown State University in the 2021 NCAA Division I baseball season. The Penguins were members of the Horizon League and played their home games at Eastwood Field in Niles, Ohio. They were led by fifth-year head coach Dan Bertolini.

== Previous season ==
The Penguins finished the 2020 NCAA Division I baseball season 7–7 overall (0–0 conference) and first place in conference standings, but the season was cut short in stages by March 17, 2020, due to the COVID-19 pandemic.

=== Preseason Horizon poll ===
For the 2021 poll, Youngstown State was projected to finish in third in the Conference.

Media poll
Predicted finish	Team	Votes (1st place)
1	Wright State	49 (7)
2	UIC	38
3	Youngstown State	34
4	Milwaukee	31
5	Purdue Fort Wayne	17
6	Oakland	14
7	Northern Kentucky	13

== Roster ==
2021 Youngstown State Penguins baseball team
Players
Coaches

#	Pos.	Name	B/T	Height	Weight	Year	Previous school	Home town
1	OF	Lucas Nasonti	R/R	5 ft 10 in (1.78 m)	180 lb (82 kg)	Sr	Champion H. S.	Warren, Ohio
2	INF	Phillip Glasser	L/R	6 ft 0 in (1.83 m)	185 lb (84 kg)	Jr	Tallmadge H. S.	Tallmadge, Ohio
3	RHP	Joel Hake	R/R	5 ft 8 in (1.73 m)	160 lb (73 kg)	RS Sr	Ursuline H. S.	Youngstown, Ohio
4	INF	Steven D'Eusanio	R/R	6 ft 0 in (1.83 m)	210 lb (95 kg)	Jr	South H. S.	Willoughby, Ohio
5	OF	Dominick Bucko	S/R	6 ft 0 in (1.83 m)	205 lb (93 kg)	Sr	Cuyahoga Community College	Saxonburg, Pennsylvania
7		Jeff Wehler	R/R	6 ft 0 in (1.83 m)	185 lb (84 kg)	Sr	St. Marys Area H. S.	St. Marys, Pennsylvania
8	RHP	Dalton Earich	R/R	6 ft 2 in (1.88 m)	210 lb (95 kg)	Sr	Manchester H. S.	New Franklin, Ohio
9	RHP	Jon Snyder	R/R	6 ft 5 in (1.96 m)	190 lb (86 kg)	RS Jr	Springboro H. S.	Springboro, Ohio
10	INF	Trey Law	L/R	5 ft 11 in (1.8 m)	150 lb (68 kg)	RS Fr	Cedar Cliff H. S.	Camp Hill, Pennsylvania
11	LHP	Colin Clark	R/L	6 ft 3 in (1.91 m)	210 lb (95 kg)	Sr	Logan Elm H. S.	Circleville, Ohio
12	LHP	Marco DeFalco	L/L	5 ft 9 in (1.75 m)	185 lb (84 kg)	Jr	Niles McKinley H. S.	Niles, Ohio
13	C	Nick Caruso	R/R	6 ft 4 in (1.93 m)	210 lb (95 kg)	RS Sr	Macomb Community College	Sterling Heights, Michigan
14	C	Dylan Carpenter	R/R	5 ft 9 in (1.75 m)	200 lb (91 kg)	RS Sr	Sinclair Community College	Maineville, Ohio
15		Chase Franklin	L/R	5 ft 9 in (1.75 m)	160 lb (73 kg)	Fr	Columbiana H. S.	Salem, Ohio
16		Blaze Glenn	R/R	5 ft 10 in (1.78 m)	195 lb (88 kg)	RS Sr	Sinclair Community College	Toronto, Ohio
17	RHP	Gary Clift Jr.	L/R	6 ft 2 in (1.88 m)	195 lb (88 kg)	RS Sr	Brunswick H. S.	Brunswick, Ohio
19	C	Dylan Swarmer	R/R	5 ft 11 in (1.8 m)	195 lb (88 kg)	Jr	Knoch H. S.	Saxonburg, Pennsylvania
20	OF	Andre Good	L/R	5 ft 9 in (1.75 m)	175 lb (79 kg)	So	Steel Valley H. S.	Munhall, Pennsylvania
21	OF	Turner Grau	L/R	6 ft 4 in (1.93 m)	180 lb (82 kg)	So	Avonworth H. S.	Pittsburgh, Pennsylvania
22	RHP	Brandon Matthews	R/R	6 ft 3 in (1.91 m)	170 lb (77 kg)	Jr	Punxsutawney H. S.	Punxsutawney, Pennsylvania
23	INF	Braeden O'Shaughnessy	R/R	6 ft 3 in (1.91 m)	180 lb (82 kg)	So	Poland Seminary H. S.	Poland, Ohio
24	LHP	Collin Floyd	L/L	6 ft 3 in (1.91 m)	180 lb (82 kg)	RS Sr	Springfield H. S.	Akron, Ohio
25	INF	Padraig O'Shaughnessy	L/L	5 ft 10 in (1.78 m)	205 lb (93 kg)	RS Jr	Mercyhurst North East	Poland, Ohio
26	RHP	Nick Perez	R/R	5 ft 11 in (1.8 m)	155 lb (70 kg)	Fr	St. Francis Preparatory School	Bayside, New York
27	LHP	Nathan Ball	L/L	6 ft 3 in (1.91 m)	190 lb (86 kg)	So	Perrysburg H. S.	Perrysburg, Ohio
30	OF	Blake Benyo	R/R	6 ft 0 in (1.83 m)	180 lb (82 kg)	RS So	IMG Academy	Austintown, Ohio
31	RHP	Will Shaffer	R/R	6 ft 3 in (1.91 m)	210 lb (95 kg)	Fr	Laurel H. S.	New Castle, Pennsylvania
32	RHP	Chad Cole	R/R	6 ft 3 in (1.91 m)	215 lb (98 kg)	Sr	Norwin H. S.	North Huntingdon, Pennsylvania
33		Travis Perry	R/R	6 ft 7 in (2.01 m)	240 lb (109 kg)	Jr	Rocky Grove H. S.	Oil City, Pennsylvania
34	LHP	Kenny Misik	L/L	5 ft 11 in (1.8 m)	205 lb (93 kg)	RS Fr	Austintown Fitch H. S.	Austintown, Ohio
36	RHP	Conner Johnson	R/R	6 ft 1 in (1.85 m)	200 lb (91 kg)	Jr	Salt Lake Community College	Heber City, Utah
37	RHP	Casey Marshalwitz	L/R	6 ft 1 in (1.85 m)	175 lb (79 kg)	So	Hampton H. S.	Gibsonia, Pennsylvania
38	C	John Ritter	R/R	6 ft 2 in (1.88 m)	210 lb (95 kg)	Jr	Springfield Local H. S.	New Middletown, Ohio
40	RHP	Grant Kersh	R/R	6 ft 0 in (1.83 m)	210 lb (95 kg)	RS Jr	Archbishop Hoban H. S.	Akron, Ohio
41		Andrew Russell	L/R	6 ft 1 in (1.85 m)	190 lb (86 kg)	So	Champion H. S.	Champion, Ohio
42	RHP	Alex Cordona	R/R	5 ft 8 in (1.73 m)	175 lb (79 kg)	Jr	Mercyhurst North East	Boardman, Ohio

Head coach

6 Dan Bertolini

Assistant coach(es)

Eric Bunnell

Hitting coach(es)

Eric Smith

Pitching coach(es)

Shane Davis

Legend

- (C) Team captain
- (S) Suspended
- (I) Ineligible
- Injured
- Current redshirt

Roster

== Schedule ==
2021 Youngstown State Penguins baseball game log
Regular season
February (2–6)

#	Date	Opponent	Site/stadium	Score	Win	Loss	Save	Attendance	Overall record	Horizon record
1	February 19	at Troy	Riddle–Pace Field • Troy, Alabama	4–10	Ortiz (1–0)	Clark (0–1)	None	959	0–1	–
2	February 20	at Troy	Riddle–Pace Field • Troy, Alabama	2–8	Gainous (1–0)	Floyd (0–1)	Oates (1)	1,002	0–2	–
3	February 20	at Troy	Riddle–Pace Field • Troy, Alabama	6–13	Witcher (1–0)	Perry (0–1)	None	1,002	0–3	–
4	February 21	at Troy	Riddle–Pace Field • Troy, Alabama	4–2	Snyder (1–0)	Wilkinson (0–1)	Clift Jr. (1)	801	1–3	–
5	February 26	at Nicholls	Ben Meyer Diamond at Ray E. Didier Field • Thibodaux, Louisiana	6–7	Desandro (1–0)	Brosky (0–1)	Taylor (1)	547	1–4	–
6	February 26	at LSU	Alex Box Stadium, Skip Bertman Field • Baton Rouge, Louisiana	2–6	Hill (2–0)	Clark (0–2)	Fontenot (1)	2,251	1–5	–
7	February 27	at LSU	Alex Box Stadium, Skip Bertman Field • Baton Rouge, Louisiana	3–5	Brady (1–0)	Clift Jr. (0–1)	None	2,578	1–6	–
8	February 28	at Nicholls	Ben Meyer Diamond at Ray E. Didier Field • Thibodaux, Louisiana	7–4	Ball (1–0)	Heckman (0–1)	Clift Jr. (2)	737	2–6	–

March (9–6)

#	Date	Opponent	Site/stadium	Score	Win	Loss	Save	Attendance	Overall record	Horizon record
9	March 5	vs Purdue Fort Wayne	Defiance High School • Defiance, Ohio	6–3	Clark (1–2)	Miller (1–1)	Clift Jr. (3)	0	3–6	1–0
10	March 6	vs Purdue Fort Wayne	Defiance High School • Defiance, Ohio	3–0	Floyd (1–1)	Boyd (0–2)	None	0	4–6	2–0
11	March 7	vs Purdue Fort Wayne	Defiance High School • Defiance, Ohio	0–1	Myer (1–0)	Cole (0–1)	None	0	4–7	2–1
12	March 7	vs Purdue Fort Wayne	Defiance High School • Defiance, Ohio	13–8	Perez (1–0)	Madura (0–2)	None	0	5–7	3–1
13	March 12	at Wright State	Nischwitz Stadium • Dayton, Ohio	2–12	Schrand (2–2)	Clark (1–3)	None	156	5–8	3–2
14	March 13	at Wright State	Nischwitz Stadium • Dayton, Ohio	1–2	Brehmer (2–1)	Floyd (1–2)	None	148	5–9	3–3
15	March 13	at Wright State	Nischwitz Stadium • Dayton, Ohio	5–14	Wirsing (2–1)	Perez (1–1)	None	146	5–10	3–4
16	March 14	at Wright State	Nischwitz Stadium • Dayton, Ohio	1–6	Cline (2–1)	Snyder (1–1)	None	158	5–11	3–5
19	March 20	St. Bonaventure	Eastwood Field • Niles, Ohio	6–4	Floyd (2–2)	Baez (0–1)	Clift Jr. (4)	0	6–11	3–5
20	March 20	St. Bonaventure	Eastwood Field • Niles, Ohio	7–1	Misik (1–0)	Breen (0–1)	None	391	7–11	3–5
21	March 21	St. Bonaventure	Eastwood Field • Niles, Ohio	22–6	Snyder (2–1)	White (0–1)	None	200	8–11	3–5
22	March 26	Wright State	Eastwood Field • Niles, Ohio	12–10	Clark (2–3)	Schrand (2–3)	Clift Jr. (5)	304	9–11	4–5
23	March 27	Wright State	Eastwood Field • Niles, Ohio	4–0	Floyd (3–2)	Brehmer (3–2)	None	329	10–11	5–5
24	March 27	Wright State	Eastwood Field • Niles, Ohio	8–20	Cline (4–1)	Snyder (2–2)	None	329	10–12	5–6
25	March 28	Wright State	Eastwood Field • Niles, Ohio	11–10	Clift Jr. (1–1)	Greenwell (0–1)	None	103	11–12	6–6

April (13–4)

#	Date	Opponent	Site/stadium	Score	Win	Loss	Save	Attendance	Overall record	Horizon record
26	April 1	UIC	Eastwood Field • Niles, Ohio	2–1	Floyd (4–2)	Key (2–2)	None	203	12–12	7–6
27	April 2	UIC	Eastwood Field • Niles, Ohio	0–6	Lopez (2–2)	Clark (2–4)	None	203	12–13	7–7
28	April 2	UIC	Eastwood Field • Niles, Ohio	15–10	Snyder (3–2)	O'Reilly (1–4)	None	284	13–13	8–7
29	April 3	UIC	Eastwood Field • Niles, Ohio	14–9	Perez (2–1)	Shears (0–5)	None	284	14–13	9–7
30	April 9	at Milwaukee	Routine Field • Franklin, Wisconsin	2–1	Floyd (5–2)	Frey (1–3)	None	289	15–13	10–7
31	April 10	at Milwaukee	Routine Field • Franklin, Wisconsin	7–4	Clark (3–4)	Mahoney (2–4)	Clift Jr. (6)	289	16–13	11–7
32	April 10	at Milwaukee	Routine Field • Franklin, Wisconsin	6–7	Armstrong (1–0)	Earich (0–1)	Blubaugh (4)	238	16–14	11–8
33	April 11	at Milwaukee	Routine Field • Franklin, Wisconsin	8–12	Blubaugh (1–1)	Clift Jr. (1–2)	None	327	16–15	11–9
34	April 16	at Northern Kentucky	Bill Aker Baseball Complex • Highland Heights, Kentucky	7–9	Gerl (3–3)	Clark (5–3)	Meeks (1)	85	16–16	11–10
35	April 17	at Northern Kentucky	Bill Aker Baseball Complex • Highland Heights, Kentucky	1–0	Floyd (6–2)	Klingenbeck (2–4)	None	–	17–16	12–10
36	April 17	at Northern Kentucky	Bill Aker Baseball Complex • Highland Heights, Kentucky	2–7	Richardson (2–0)	Perez (2–2)	None	–	17–17	12–11
37	April 18	at Northern Kentucky	Bill Aker Baseball Complex • Highland Heights, Kentucky	18–6	Snyder (4–2)	Bohlen (0–1)	None	113	18–17	13–11
38	April 23	Oakland	Eastwood Field • Niles, Ohio	4–3	Hake (1–0)	Deans (3–3)	None	229	19–17	14–11
39	April 24	Oakland	Eastwood Field • Niles, Ohio	12–6	Coles (1–1)	Nierman (1–3)	None	229	20–17	15–11
40	April 24	Oakland	Eastwood Field • Niles, Ohio	4–3	Clift Jr. (2–2)	Nierman (1–4)	None	301	21–17	16–11
41	April 25	Oakland	Eastwood Field • Niles, Ohio	18–6	Perez (3–2)	Deans (3–4)	None	213	22–17	17–11
42	April 30	at UIC	Les Miller Field at Curtis Granderson Stadium • Chicago, Illinois	1–0	Clark (4–5)	Key (5–3)	Clift Jr.' (7)	77	23–17	18–11

May (9–5)

#	Date	Opponent	Site/stadium	Score	Win	Loss	Save	Attendance	Overall record	Horizon record
43	May 1	at UIC	Les Miller Field at Curtis Granderson Stadium • Chicago, Illinois	1–3	Torres (5–1)	Floyd (6–3)	Gosbeth (3)	83	23–18	18–12
44	May 1	at UIC	Les Miller Field at Curtis Granderson Stadium • Chicago, Illinois	7–8	McCabe (1–0)	Coles (1–2)	None	103	23–19	18–13
45	May 2	at UIC	Les Miller Field at Curtis Granderson Stadium • Chicago, Illinois	7–18	Shears (1–5)	Hake (1–1)	None	124	23–20	18–14
46	May 7	Purdue Fort Wayne	Eastwood Field • Niles, Ohio	6–2	Floyd (7–3)	Fee (0–3)	None	219	24–20	19–14
47	May 7	Purdue Fort Wayne	Eastwood Field • Niles, Ohio	15–4	Clark (5–5)	Pintarich (1–5)	None	219	25–20	20–14
48	May 8	Purdue Fort Wayne	Eastwood Field • Niles, Ohio	1–3	Miller (4–6)	Clift Jr. (2–3)	Boyd (1)	218	25–21	20–15
49	May 8	Purdue Fort Wayne	Eastwood Field • Niles, Ohio	7–5	Coles (2–2)	Boyd (0–6)	None	218	26–21	21–15
50	May 14	at Bellarmine	Knights Field • Louisville, Kentucky	11–3	Clark (6–5)	Pender (2–5)	None	50	27–21	21–15
51	May 15	at Bellarmine	Knights Field • Louisville, Kentucky	11–6	Floyd (8–3)	Nagel (2–4)	None	100	28–21	21–15
52	May 16	at Bellarmine	Knights Field • Louisville, Kentucky	5–1	Snyder (5–2)	Davis (0–6)	Clift Jr. (8)	50	29–21	21–15
53	May 21	Milwaukee	Eastwood Field • Niles, Ohio	3–2	Floyd (9–3)	Frey (2–8)	Clark (1)	370	30–21	22–15
54	May 22	Milwaukee	Eastwood Field • Niles, Ohio	9–4	Snyder (6–2)	Edwards (2–7)	Hake (1)	488	31–21	23–15
55	May 21	Milwaukee	Eastwood Field • Niles, Ohio	12–14	Severson (1–0)	Perez (3–3)	None	488	31–22	23–16
56	May 23	Milwaukee	Eastwood Field • Niles, Ohio	10–2	Perry (1–1)	Neu (3–3)	None	431	32–22	24–16

Postseason
Horizon League Tournament

#	Date	Opponent	Site/stadium	Score	Win	Loss	Save	Attendance	Overall record	Horizon record
57	May 27	vs UIC	Nischwitz Stadium • Dayton, Ohio	4–7	Key (7–3)	Clark (6–6)	Gosbeth (7)	178	32–23	24–16
58	May 27	vs Milwaukee	Nischwitz Stadium • Dayton, Ohio	6–9	Mahoney (5–6)	Floyd (9–4)	Blubaugh (8)	154	32–24	24–16

== Awards and honors ==
=== Horizon League Players of the Week ===
Weekly Awards
Player	Award	Date Awarded	Ref.
Jon Snyder	Nike Horizon League Pitcher of the Week	February 24, 2021	
Turner Grau	Nike Horizon League Hitter of the Week	March 2, 2021	
Collin Floyd	Nike Horizon League Pitcher of the Week	March 10, 2021	
Collin Floyd	Nike Horizon League Pitcher of the Week	March 30, 2021	
Dominick Bucko	Nike Horizon League Hitter of the Week	April 6, 2021	
Collin Floyd	Nike Horizon League Pitcher of the Week	April 13, 2021	
Nick Caruso	Nike Horizon League Batter of the Week	April 20, 2021	
Colin Clark	Nike Horizon League Pitcher of the Week	May 4, 2021	
Blaze Glenn	Nike Horizon League Player of the Week	May 11, 2021	
Travis Perry	Nike Horizon League Pitcher of the Week	May 24, 2021	
