= 2020 Youngstown State Penguins baseball team =

American college baseball season

2020 Youngstown State Penguins baseball
- Conference: Horizon League
- Record: 7–7 (0–0 Horizon)
- Head coach: Dan Bertolini (4th season)
- Assistant coach: Eric Bunnell (2nd season)
- Hitting coach: Eric Smith (4th season)
- Pitching coach: Shane Davis (2nd season)
- Home stadium: Eastwood Field

2020 Horizon League baseball standings
	Conf.				Overall
Team	W		L	PCT	W		L	PCT
Youngstown State ‍‍‍	0	–	0	–	7	–	7	.500
Wright State ‍‍‍	0	–	0	–	6	–	9	.400
UIC ‍‍‍	0	–	0	–	4	–	12	.250
Oakland ‍‍‍	0	–	0	–	2	–	8	.200
Milwaukee ‍‍‍	0	–	0	–	1	–	14	.067
Northern Kentucky ‍‍‍	0	–	0	–	0	–	17	.000
‡ – Tournament champion As of March 12, 2020; Rankings from D1Baseball

The 2020 Youngstown State Penguins baseball team was a baseball team that represented Youngstown State University in the 2020 NCAA Division I baseball season. The Penguins were members of the Horizon League and played their home games at Eastwood Field in Niles, Ohio. They were led by fourth-year head coach Dan Bertolini.

The season was cut short in stages by March 17 due to the COVID-19 pandemic.

== Previous season ==
The Penguins finished the 2019 NCAA Division I baseball season 13–41 overall (7–20 conference) and sixth place in conference standings, qualifying for the 2019 Horizon League baseball tournament.

== Roster ==
2020 Youngstown State Penguins baseball team
Players
Coaches

#	Pos.	Name	B/T	Height	Weight	Year	Previous school	Home town
1	OF	Lucas Nasonti	R/R	5 ft 10 in (1.78 m)	180 lb (82 kg)	Jr	Champion H. S.	Warren, Ohio
2	INF	Phillip Glasser	L/R	6 ft 0 in (1.83 m)	185 lb (84 kg)	So	Tallmadge H. S.	Tallmadge, Ohio
3	RHP	Joel Hake	R/R	5 ft 8 in (1.73 m)	160 lb (73 kg)	RS Sr	Ursuline H. S.	Youngstown, Ohio
4	INF	Steven D'Eusanio	R/R	6 ft 0 in (1.83 m)	210 lb (95 kg)	So	South H. S.	Willoughby, Ohio
5	OF	Dominick Bucko	S/R	6 ft 0 in (1.83 m)	205 lb (93 kg)	Jr	Cuyahoga Community College	Saxonburg, Pennsylvania
7		Jeff Wehler	R/R	6 ft 0 in (1.83 m)	185 lb (84 kg)	Jr	St. Marys Area H. S.	St. Marys, Pennsylvania
8	RHP	Dalton Earich	R/R	6 ft 2 in (1.88 m)	210 lb (95 kg)	Jr	Manchester H. S.	New Franklin, Ohio
9	RHP	Jon Snyder	R/R	6 ft 5 in (1.96 m)	190 lb (86 kg)	RS So	Springboro H. S.	Springboro, Ohio
10	INF	Cody Dennis	R/R	6 ft 1 in (1.85 m)	185 lb (84 kg)	Sr	Sinclair Community College	Newark, Ohio
11	LHP	Colin Clark	R/L	6 ft 3 in (1.91 m)	210 lb (95 kg)	Jr	Logan Elm H. S.	Circleville, Ohio
12	LHP	Marco DeFalco	L/L	5 ft 9 in (1.75 m)	185 lb (84 kg)	So	Niles McKinley H. S.	Niles, Ohio
13	C	Nick Caruso	R/R	6 ft 4 in (1.93 m)	210 lb (95 kg)	RS Sr	Macomb Community College	Sterling Heights, Michigan
14	C	Dylan Carpenter	R/R	5 ft 9 in (1.75 m)	200 lb (91 kg)	RS Jr	Sinclair Community College	Maineville, Ohio
16		Blaze Glenn	R/R	5 ft 10 in (1.78 m)	195 lb (88 kg)	RS Sr	Sinclair Community College	Toronto, Ohio
17	RHP	Gary Clift Jr.	L/R	6 ft 2 in (1.88 m)	195 lb (88 kg)	Sr	Brunswick H. S.	Brunswick, Ohio
18	RHP	Bryce Warwick	R/R	6 ft 2 in (1.88 m)	215 lb (98 kg)	Fr	Perry H. S.	Canton, Ohio
19	C	Dylan Swarmer	R/R	5 ft 11 in (1.8 m)	195 lb (88 kg)	So	Knoch H. S.	Saxonburg, Pennsylvania
20	OF	Andre Good	L/R	5 ft 9 in (1.75 m)	175 lb (79 kg)	Fr	Steel Valley H. S.	Munhall, Pennsylvania
21	OF	Turner Grau	L/R	6 ft 4 in (1.93 m)	180 lb (82 kg)	Fr	Avonworth H. S.	Pittsburgh, Pennsylvania
22	RHP	Brandon Matthews	R/R	6 ft 3 in (1.91 m)	170 lb (77 kg)	So	Punxsutawney H. S.	Punxsutawney, Pennsylvania
23	INF	Braeden O'Shaughnessy	R/R	6 ft 3 in (1.91 m)	180 lb (82 kg)	So	Poland Seminary H. S.	Poland, Ohio
24	LHP	Collin Floyd	L/L	6 ft 3 in (1.91 m)	180 lb (82 kg)	So	Springfield H. S.	Akron, Ohio
25	INF	Padraig O'Shaughnessy	L/L	5 ft 10 in (1.78 m)	205 lb (93 kg)	RS So	Mercyhurst North East	Poland, Ohio
26	OF	Cameron Murray	R/R	5 ft 10 in (1.78 m)	165 lb (75 kg)	Sr	Cincinnati Hills Christian Academy	Cincinnati, Ohio
27	LHP	Nathan Ball	L/L	6 ft 3 in (1.91 m)	190 lb (86 kg)	Fr	Perrysburg H. S.	Perrysburg, Ohio
30	OF	Blake Benyo	R/R	6 ft 0 in (1.83 m)	180 lb (82 kg)	RS Fr	IMG Academy	Austintown, Ohio
31	INF	Nick LaBrasca	R/R	6 ft 5 in (1.96 m)	235 lb (107 kg)	RS So	DuBois Area H. S.	DuBois, Pennsylvania
32	RHP	Chad Cole	R/R	6 ft 3 in (1.91 m)	215 lb (98 kg)	Jr	Norwin H. S.	North Huntingdon, Pennsylvania
33		Travis Perry	R/R	6 ft 7 in (2.01 m)	240 lb (109 kg)	So	Rocky Grove H. S.	Oil City, Pennsylvania
34	LHP	Kenny Misik	L/L	5 ft 11 in (1.8 m)	205 lb (93 kg)	Fr	Austintown Fitch H. S.	Austintown, Ohio
35	RHP	Zack Minney	R/R	6 ft 2 in (1.88 m)	190 lb (86 kg)	RS Sr	Lorain County Community College	Elyria, Ohio
36	INF	Trey Law	L/R	5 ft 11 in (1.8 m)	150 lb (68 kg)	Fr	Cedar Cliff H. S.	Camp Hill, Pennsylvania
37	RHP	Casey Marshalwitz	L/R	6 ft 1 in (1.85 m)	175 lb (79 kg)	Fr	Hampton H. S.	Gibsonia, Pennsylvania
38	C	John Ritter	R/R	6 ft 2 in (1.88 m)	210 lb (95 kg)	So	Springfield Local H. S.	New Middletown, Ohio
40	RHP	Grant Kersh	R/R	6 ft 0 in (1.83 m)	210 lb (95 kg)	RS So	Archbishop Hoban H. S.	Akron, Ohio

Head coach

6 Dan Bertolini

Assistant coach(es)

Eric Bunnell

Hitting coach(es)

Eric Smith

Pitching coach(es)

Shane Davis

Legend

- (C) Team captain
- (S) Suspended
- (I) Ineligible
- Injured
- Current redshirt

Roster
Last update: February 29, 2020

== Schedule ==
2020 Youngstown State Penguins baseball game log
Regular season
February (4–5)

#	Date	Opponent	Site/stadium	Score	Win	Loss	Save	Attendance	Overall record	Horizon record
1	February 14	at Houston	Schroeder Park • Houston, Texas,	3–7	Hurdsman (1–0)	Clark (0–1)	None	1,074	0–1	–
2	February 15	at Houston	Schroeder Park • Houston, Texas	6–3	Clift Jr. (1–0)	Henry (0–1)	Hake (1)	1,128	1–1	–
3	February 16	at Houston	Schroeder Park • Houston, Texas	8–6	Earich (1–0)	Hynes (0–1)	None	1,047	2–1	–
4	February 21	at College of Charleston	CofC Baseball Stadium at Patriots Point • Mount Pleasant, South Carolina,	4–5	Good (1–0)	Hake (0–1)	None	473	2–2	–
5	February 22	at College of Charleston	CofC Baseball Stadium at Patriots Point • Mount Pleasant, South Carolina	4–14	Smith (2–0)	Floyd (0–1)	None	542	2–3	–
6	February 23	at College of Charleston	CofC Baseball Stadium at Patriots Point • Mount Pleasant, South Carolina	3–7	Williams (1–0)	Snyder (0–1)	None	576	2–4	–
7	February 27	at Abilene Christian	Crutcher Scott Field • Abilene, Texas,	2–5	Wagner (1–1)	Perry (0–1)	None	333	2–5	–
8	February 28	at Abilene Christian	Crutcher Scott Field • Abilene, Texas	4–2	Clark (1–1)	Ruesch (1–2)	None	357	3–5	–
9	February 29	at Abilene Christian	Crutcher Scott Field • Abilene, Texas	9–0	Floyd (1–1)	Hawkins (1–1)	None	321	4–5	–

March (3–1)

#	Date	Opponent	Site/stadium	Score	Win	Loss	Save	Attendance	Overall record	Horizon record
10	March 4	at Pittsburgh	Charles L. Cost Field • Pittsburgh, Pennsylvania	7–5	Clift Jr. (2–0)	Smith (1–1)	None	215	5–5	–
11	March 6	at North Carolina Central	Durham Athletic Park • Durham, North Carolina,	5–6	Meylan (1–0)	Earich (1–1)	Bell (3)	114	5–6	–
12	March 7	at North Carolina Central	Durham Athletic Park • Durham, North Carolina	3–1	Floyd (2–1)	McRoy (0–1)	Clift Jr. (1)	200	6–6	–
13	March 8	at North Carolina Central	Durham Athletic Park • Durham, North Carolina	8–7	Coles (1–0)	Bell (0–2)	Clift Jr. (2)	195	7–6	–
14	March 10	Bowling Green	Eastwood Field • Niles, Ohio,	1–2	Stopp (1–1)	Marshalwitz (0–1)	Lohmeier (1)	161	7–7	–
15	March 13	at Northern Kentucky	Bill Aker Baseball Complex • Highland Heights, Kentucky,	Canceled (COVID-19 pandemic)						
16	March 14	at Northern Kentucky	Bill Aker Baseball Complex • Highland Heights, Kentucky	Canceled (COVID-19 pandemic)						
17	March 15	at Northern Kentucky	Bill Aker Baseball Complex • Highland Heights, Kentucky	Canceled (COVID-19 pandemic)						
18	March 17	at Toledo	Scott Park Baseball Complex • Toledo, Ohio,	Canceled (COVID-19 pandemic)						
19	March 18	St. Bonaventure	Eastwood Field • Niles, Ohio	Canceled (COVID-19 pandemic)						
20	March 20	at Milwaukee	Routine Field • Franklin, Wisconsin	Canceled (COVID-19 pandemic)						
21	March 21	at Milwaukee	Routine Field • Franklin, Wisconsin	Canceled (COVID-19 pandemic)						
22	March 22	at Milwaukee	Routine Field • Franklin, Wisconsin	Canceled (COVID-19 pandemic)						
23	March 25	at Pittsburgh	Charles L. Cost Field • Pittsburgh, Pennsylvania	Canceled (COVID-19 pandemic)						
24	March 27	UIC	Eastwood Field • Niles, Ohio	Canceled (COVID-19 pandemic)						
25	March 28	UIC	Eastwood Field • Niles, Ohio	Canceled (COVID-19 pandemic)						
26	March 29	UIC	Eastwood Field • Niles, Ohio	Canceled (COVID-19 pandemic)						
27	March 31	Niagara	Eastwood Field • Niles, Ohio	Canceled (COVID-19 pandemic)						

April (0–0)

#	Date	Opponent	Site/stadium	Score	Win	Loss	Save	Attendance	Overall record	Horizon record
28	April 3	at Wright State	Nischwitz Stadium • Dayton, Ohio,	Canceled (COVID-19 pandemic)						
29	April 4	at Wright State	Nischwitz Stadium • Dayton, Ohio	Canceled (COVID-19 pandemic)						
30	April 5	at Wright State	Nischwitz Stadium • Dayton, Ohio	Canceled (COVID-19 pandemic)						
31	April 7	at Ohio	Bob Wren Stadium • Athens, Ohio,	Canceled (COVID-19 pandemic)						
32	April 8	at Kent State	Schoonover Stadium • Kent, Ohio,	Canceled (COVID-19 pandemic)						
33	April 9	Oakland	Eastwood Field • Niles, Ohio	Canceled (COVID-19 pandemic)						
34	April 10	Oakland	Eastwood Field • Niles, Ohio	Canceled (COVID-19 pandemic)						
35	April 11	Oakland	Eastwood Field • Niles, Ohio	Canceled (COVID-19 pandemic)						
36	April 14	at St. Bonaventure	Fred Handler Park • St. Bonaventure, New York,	Canceled (COVID-19 pandemic)						
37	April 17	at UIC	Les Miller Field at Curtis Granderson Stadium • Chicago, Illinois	Canceled (COVID-19 pandemic)						
38	April 18	at UIC	Les Miller Field at Curtis Granderson Stadium • Chicago, Illinois	Canceled (COVID-19 pandemic)						
39	April 19	at UIC	Les Miller Field at Curtis Granderson Stadium • Chicago, Illinois	Canceled (COVID-19 pandemic)						
40	April 21	Ohio	Eastwood Field • Niles, Ohio	Canceled (COVID-19 pandemic)						
41	April 22	at Niagara	John P. Bobo Field • Lewiston, New York,	Canceled (COVID-19 pandemic)						
42	April 24	Northern Kentucky	Eastwood Field • Niles, Ohio	Canceled (COVID-19 pandemic)						
43	April 25	Northern Kentucky	Eastwood Field • Niles, Ohio	Canceled (COVID-19 pandemic)						
44	April 26	Northern Kentucky	Eastwood Field • Niles, Ohio	Canceled (COVID-19 pandemic)						
45	April 28	Pittsburgh	Eastwood Field • Niles, Ohio	Canceled (COVID-19 pandemic)						
46	April 29	at Akron	Lee R. Jackson Field • Akron, Ohio,	Canceled (COVID-19 pandemic)						

May (0–0)

#	Date	Opponent	Site/stadium	Score	Win	Loss	Save	Attendance	Overall record	Horizon record
47	May 1	Wright State	Eastwood Field • Niles, Ohio	Canceled (COVID-19 pandemic)						
48	May 2	Wright State	Eastwood Field • Niles, Ohio	Canceled (COVID-19 pandemic)						
49	May 3	Wright State	Eastwood Field • Niles, Ohio	Canceled (COVID-19 pandemic)						
50	May 8	at Oakland	Oakland Baseball Field • Rochester, Michigan,	Canceled (COVID-19 pandemic)						
51	May 9	at Oakland	Oakland Baseball Field • Rochester, Michigan	Canceled (COVID-19 pandemic)						
52	May 10	at Oakland	Oakland Baseball Field • Rochester, Michigan	Canceled (COVID-19 pandemic)						
53	May 12	Kent State	Eastwood Field • Niles, Ohio	Canceled (COVID-19 pandemic)						
54	May 14	Milwaukee	Eastwood Field • Niles, Ohio	Canceled (COVID-19 pandemic)						
55	May 15	Milwaukee	Eastwood Field • Niles, Ohio	Canceled (COVID-19 pandemic)						
56	May 16	Milwaukee	Eastwood Field • Niles, Ohio	Canceled (COVID-19 pandemic)						

== Awards and honors ==
=== Horizon League Players of the Week ===
Weekly Awards
Player	Award	Date awarded	Ref.
Collin Floyd	Nike Horizon League Pitcher of the Week	February 17, 2020	
Chad Coles	Nike Horizon League Pitcher of the Week	February 24, 2020	
Nick Caruso	Nike Horizon League Batter of the Week	February 24, 2020	
Colin Clark	Nike Horizon League Pitcher of the Week	March 2, 2020	
Phillip Glasser	Nike Horizon League Batter of the Week	March 2, 2020	
