= 2021 Purdue Fort Wayne Mastodons baseball team =

American college baseball season

2021 Purdue Fort Wayne Mastodons baseball
- Conference: Horizon League
- Record: 11–35 (8–28 Horizon)
- Head coach: Doug Schreiber (2nd season)
- Assistant coach: Gordon Cardenas (2nd season)
- Hitting coach: Ken Jones (2nd season)
- Pitching coach: Brent McNeil (2nd season)
- Home stadium: Mastodon Field

2021 Horizon League baseball standings
| | Conf. | | | | Overall |
| Team | W | | L | PCT | W | | L | PCT |
|---|---|---|---|---|---|---|---|---|
| Wright State ‍†‍‡‍^{y} | 28 | – | 4 | .875 | 35 | – | 13 | .729 |
| UIC ‍‍‍ | 28 | – | 11 | .718 | 30 | – | 18 | .625 |
| Youngstown State ‍‍‍ | 24 | – | 16 | .600 | 32 | – | 24 | .571 |
| Milwaukee ‍‍‍ | 17 | – | 23 | .425 | 22 | – | 33 | .400 |
| Oakland ‍‍‍ | 13 | – | 23 | .361 | 19 | – | 28 | .404 |
| Northern Kentucky ‍‍‍ | 14 | – | 25 | .359 | 17 | – | 31 | .354 |
| Purdue Fort Wayne ‍‍‍ | 7 | – | 29 | .194 | 10 | – | 36 | .217 |
† – Conference champion ‡ – Tournament champion y – Invited to the NCAA tournament As of June 5, 2021; Rankings from D1Baseball

The 2021 Purdue Fort Wayne Mastodons baseball team was a baseball team that represented Purdue University Fort Wayne in the 2021 NCAA Division I baseball season. The Mastodons were members of the Horizon League and play their home games at Mastodon Field in Fort Wayne, Indiana. They were led by second-year head coach Doug Schreiber.

== Previous season ==
The Mastodons finished the 2020 NCAA Division I baseball season 5–10 overall (0–0 conference) and tied for first place in conference standings. The season was cut short in stages by March 12, 2020, due to the COVID-19 pandemic.

== Preseason Horizon poll ==
For the 2021 poll, Purdue Fort Wayne was projected to finish in fifth in the Conference.

Media poll
| Predicted finish | Team | Votes (1st place) |
| 1 | Wright State | 49 (7) |
| 2 | UIC | 38 |
| 3 | Youngstown State | 34 |
| 4 | Milwaukee | 31 |
| 5 | Purdue Fort Wayne | 17 |
| 6 | Oakland | 14 |
| 7 | Northern Kentucky | 13 |

== Roster ==
2021 Purdue Fort Wayne Mastodons baseball team
Players
Coaches

| # | Pos. | Name | B/T | Height | Weight | Year | Previous school | Home town |
|---|---|---|---|---|---|---|---|---|
| 1 | OF | Garrett Maish | R/R | 5 ft 7 in (1.7 m) | 170 lb (77 kg) | Fr | McCutcheon H. S. | Lafayette, Indiana |
| 2 | C | Dylan Stewart | R/R | 5 ft 10 in (1.78 m) | 160 lb (73 kg) | Jr | Milford H. S. | Milford, Ohio |
| 3 | RHP | Trevor Armstrong | L/R | 6 ft 0 in (1.83 m) | 170 lb (77 kg) | Sr | Snider H. S. | Fort Wayne, Indiana |
| 5 | INF | Jack Lang | R/R | 6 ft 0 in (1.83 m) | 185 lb (84 kg) | Sr | Hamilton Southeastern H. S. | Fishers, Indiana |
| 6 | OF | Ryan Mollette | L/L | 5 ft 8 in (1.73 m) | 150 lb (68 kg) | So | Newton H. S. | Ludlow Falls, Ohio |
| 7 | | Alex Evenson | L/L | 6 ft 1 in (1.85 m) | 175 lb (79 kg) | Sr | Century College | Minnetonka, Minnesota |
| 8 | INF | Trenton Stoner | R/R | 6 ft 0 in (1.83 m) | 185 lb (84 kg) | Sr | Clay H. S. | Granger, Indiana |
| 9 | OF | Justin Greene | L/R | 6 ft 0 in (1.83 m) | 190 lb (86 kg) | RS Jr | Ivy Tech Community College of Indiana | Carmel, Indiana |
| 10 | INF | Zac Baden | R/R | 6 ft 0 in (1.83 m) | 190 lb (86 kg) | RS So | Rock Valley College | Poplar Grove, Illinois |
| 11 | OF | Evan Huffman | R/R | 6 ft 1 in (1.85 m) | 185 lb (84 kg) | Sr | Ivy Tech Community College | Warren, Indiana |
| 12 | INF | Brian Erbe | R/R | 6 ft 1 in (1.85 m) | 185 lb (84 kg) | RS So | Oakwood H. S. | Dayton, Ohio |
| 13 | INF | Aaron Chapman | R/R | 6 ft 0 in (1.83 m) | 190 lb (86 kg) | Jr | Waterford Union H. S. | Waterford, Wisconsin |
| 14 | RHP | Brian Skelton | R/R | 6 ft 2 in (1.88 m) | 205 lb (93 kg) | Sr | Westfield H. S. | Westfield, Indiana |
| 15 | RHP | William Wentz | R/R | 6 ft 2 in (1.88 m) | 180 lb (82 kg) | Sr | Kankakee Community College | Indianapolis, Indiana |
| 16 | | Garett Lake | L/L | 6 ft 0 in (1.83 m) | 200 lb (91 kg) | Sr | Pima Community College | Henderson, Nevada |
| 17 | LHP | Jacob Myer | L/L | 6 ft 4 in (1.93 m) | 190 lb (86 kg) | So | Iowa Lakes Community College | Milwaukee, Wisconsin |
| 18 | LHP | Justin Miller | L/L | 5 ft 9 in (1.75 m) | 180 lb (82 kg) | Jr | Homestead H. S. | Roanoke, Indiana |
| 19 | RHP | Gerald Pintarich | R/R | 6 ft 1 in (1.85 m) | 195 lb (88 kg) | So | Cuyahoga Community College | St. Clairsville, Ohio |
| 20 | RHP | Cameron Boyd | R/R | 6 ft 3 in (1.91 m) | 195 lb (88 kg) | RS Sr | Fishers H. S. | Fishers, Indiana |
| 21 | | Luke Miles | R/R | 6 ft 1 in (1.85 m) | 195 lb (88 kg) | So | Franklin Community H. S. | Morgantown, Indiana |
| 22 | OF | Lucas Kolovitz | L/R | 6 ft 1 in (1.85 m) | 200 lb (91 kg) | So | Fenwick H. S. | Oak Park, Illinois |
| 23 | RHP | Michael Madura | R/R | 6 ft 6 in (1.98 m) | 190 lb (86 kg) | RS Jr | South Suburban College | Munster, Indiana |
| 24 | OF | Robert Young III | R/R | 6 ft 2 in (1.88 m) | 208 lb (94 kg) | RS Sr | North Central H. S. | Indianapolis, Indiana |
| 25 | RHP | Cade Willard | R/R | 6 ft 1 in (1.85 m) | 195 lb (88 kg) | RS Jr | Eastside H. S. | Butler, Indiana |
| 27 | | Madon Douglas | L/L | 6 ft 2 in (1.88 m) | 200 lb (91 kg) | Fr | McCutcheon H. S. | Lafayette, Indiana |
| 29 | C | Brooks Sailors | L/R | 5 ft 11 in (1.8 m) | 160 lb (73 kg) | Fr | Westfield H. S. | Westfield, Indiana |
| 31 | RHP | Austin Holt | R/R | 6 ft 3 in (1.91 m) | 205 lb (93 kg) | Fr | Lewis Cass H. S. | Kokomo, Indiana |
| 32 | RHP | Kevin Fee | R/R | 6 ft 5 in (1.96 m) | 215 lb (98 kg) | Fr | New Albany H. S. | New Albany, Ohio |
| 33 | RHP | Nathan Hefle | R/R | 6 ft 0 in (1.83 m) | 200 lb (91 kg) | Sr | Germantown H. S. | Germantown, Wisconsin |
| 34 | RHP | Teddy Eyink | R/R | 6 ft 3 in (1.91 m) | 220 lb (100 kg) | Fr | Saint Ignatius H. S. | Hinckley, Ohio |
| 35 | RHP | Sean Ferguson | R/R | 6 ft 4 in (1.93 m) | 215 lb (98 kg) | Sr | Parkland College | New Haven, Indiana |
| 36 | | Ryan Robison | R/R | 6 ft 3 in (1.91 m) | 250 lb (113 kg) | So | Vincennes University | New Albany, Indiana |
| 37 | C | Andrew Arteaga | L/R | 6 ft 3 in (1.91 m) | 245 lb (111 kg) | RS Sr | Mira Costa H. S. | Torrance, California |
| 38 | INF | Andrew Lawvere | R/R | 5 ft 10 in (1.78 m) | 210 lb (95 kg) | RS Sr | Eastbrook H. S. | Upland, Indiana |
| 10 | RHP | Sam Assaf | R/R | 6 ft 0 in (1.83 m) | 170 lb (77 kg) | Fr | Powers Catholic H. S. | Flushing, Michigan |
| | INF | Charles Lyons | R/R | 5 ft 8 in (1.73 m) | 160 lb (73 kg) | RS So | Southfield A&T H. S. | Southfield, Michigan |

Head coach

Doug Schreiber

Assistant coach(es)

Hitting coach(es)

Ken Jones

Base coach(es)

Gordon Cardenas

Pitching coach(es)

Brent McNeil

Legend

- (C) Team captain
- (S) Suspended
- (I) Ineligible
- Injured
- Current redshirt

Roster
Last update: February 15, 2021

== Schedule ==
2021 Purdue Fort Wayne Mastodons baseball game log
Regular season
February (1–3)

| # | Date | Opponent | Site/stadium | Score | Win | Loss | Save | Attendance | Overall record | Horizon record |
|---|---|---|---|---|---|---|---|---|---|---|
| 1 | February 26 | at Murray State | Reagan Field • Murray, Kentucky | 10–6 | Miller (1–0) | Gardner (0–1) | None | 100 | 1–0 | – |
| 2 | February 26 | at Murray State | Reagan Field • Murray, Kentucky | 5–9 | Wenninger (1–0) | Boyd (0–1) | None | 50 | 1–1 | – |
| 3 | February 27 | at Murray State | Reagan Field • Murray, Kentucky | 4–5 | Pennington (1–0) | Fee (0–1) | – | 107 | 1–2 | – |
| 4 | February 27 | at Murray State | Reagan Field • Murray, Kentucky | 2–3 | Whaley (1–0) | Madura (0–1) | Holden (1) | 86 | 1–3 | – |

March (7–9)

| # | Date | Opponent | Site/stadium | Score | Win | Loss | Save | Attendance | Overall record | Horizon record |
|---|---|---|---|---|---|---|---|---|---|---|
| 5 | March 5 | vs Youngstown State | Defiance High School • Defiance, Ohio | 3–6 | Clark (1–2) | Miller (1–1) | Clift Jr. (3) | 0 | 1–4 | 0–1 |
| 6 | March 6 | vs Youngstown State | Defiance High School • Defiance, Ohio | 0–3 | Floyd (1–1) | Boyd (0–2) | None | 0 | 1–5 | 0–2 |
| 7 | March 6 | vs Youngstown State | Defiance High School • Defiance, Ohio | 1–0 | Myers (1–0) | Cole (0–1) | None | 0 | 2–5 | 1–2 |
| 8 | March 7 | vsYoungstown State | Defiance High School • Defiance, Ohio | 8–13 | Perez (1–0) | Madura (0–2) | None | 0 | 2–6 | 1–3 |
| 9 | March 12 | at Butler | Bulldog Park • Indianapolis, Indiana | 6–3 | Miller (2–1) | Schultz (0–1) | Robison (2) | 150 | 3–6 | 1–3 |
| 10 | March 13 | at Butler | Bulldog Park • Indianapolis, Indiana | 0–2 | Myers (1–0) | Boyd (0–3) | Pilcher (1) | 150 | 3–7 | 1–3 |
| 11 | March 14 | at Butler | Bulldog Park • Indianapolis, Indiana | 9–6 | Myer (2–0) | Vore (1–0) | Robison (3) | 150 | 4–7 | 1–3 |
| 12 | March 19 | Oakland | Mastodon Field • Fort Wayne, Indiana | 3–9 | Deans (3–0) | Miller (2–2) | None | 89 | 4–8 | 1–4 |
| 13 | March 20 | Oakland | Mastodon Field • Fort Wayne, Indiana | 5–4 | Robison (1–0) | Hill (1–1) | None | 112 | 5–8 | 2–4 |
| 14 | March 20 | Oakland | Mastodon Field • Fort Wayne, Indiana | 6–3 | Myer (3–0) | Hill (1–2) | Robison (4) | 121 | 6–8 | 3–4 |
| 15 | March 21 | Oakland | Mastodon Field • Fort Wayne, Indiana | 8–7 | Miller (3–2) | Tucker (0–3) | None | 125 | 7–8 | 4–4 |
| 16 | March 26 | at Milwaukee | Routine Field • Franklin, Wisconsin | 3–6 | Neu (2–0) | Robison (1–1) | Blubaugh (1) | 395 | 7–9 | 4–5 |
| 17 | March 27 | at Milwaukee | Routine Field • Franklin, Wisconsin | 6–5 | Wohlt (1–0) | Myer (3–1) | None | 451 | 7–10 | 4–6 |
| 18 | March 27 | at Milwaukee | Routine Field • Franklin, Wisconsin | 2–5 | LaRock (1–1) | Boyd (0–4) | McCarthy (2) | 451 | 7–11 | 4–7 |
| 19 | March 28 | at Milwaukee | Routine Field • Franklin, Wisconsin | 3–14 | Mahoney (2–3) | Pintarich (0–1) | None | 343 | 7–12 | 4–8 |

April (2–10)

| # | Date | Opponent | Site/stadium | Score | Win | Loss | Save | Attendance | Overall record | Horizon record |
|---|---|---|---|---|---|---|---|---|---|---|
| 20 | April 1 | Northern Kentucky | World Baseball Academy • Fort Wayne, Indiana | 14–0 | Pintarich (1–1) | Gerl (1–2) | None | 87 | 8–12 | 5–8 |
| 21 | April 2 | Northern Kentucky | Parkview Field • Fort Wayne, Indiana | 4–5 | Richardson (2–0) | Myer (3–2) | Noble (1) | 121 | 8–13 | 5–9 |
| 22 | April 2 | Northern Kentucky | Parkview Field • Fort Wayne, Indiana | 10–11 | Klingenbeck (3–2) | Miller (3–3) | Ollier (3) | – | 8–14 | 5–10 |
| 23 | April 3 | Northern Kentucky | Parkview Field • Fort Wayne, Indiana | 9–8 | Evenson (1–0) | Ollier (0–2) | None | – | 9–14 | 6–10 |
| 24 | April 9 | at Wright State | Nischwitz Stadium • Dayton, Ohio | Canceled (COVID-19) | | | | | | |
| 25 | April 10 | at Wright State | Nischwitz Stadium • Dayton, Ohio | Canceled (COVID-19) | | | | | | |
| 26 | April 10 | at Wright State | Nischwitz Stadium • Dayton, Ohio | Canceled (COVID-19) | | | | | | |
| 27 | April 11 | at Wright State | Nischwitz Stadium • Dayton, Ohio | Canceled (COVID-19) | | | | | | |
| 28 | April 16 | at UIC | Les Miller Field at Curtis Granderson Stadium • Chicago, Illinois | 0–1 | Key (4–2) | Pintarich (1–2) | None | 35 | 9–15 | 6–11 |
| 29 | April 17 | at UIC | Les Miller Field at Curtis Granderson Stadium • Chicago, Illinois | 0–2 | O'Reilly (2–5) | Myers (3–3) | Morris (1) | 76 | 9–16 | 6–12 |
| 30 | April 17 | at UIC | Les Miller Field at Curtis Granderson Stadium • Chicago, Illinois | 2–4 | Torres (3–1) | Miller (3–4) | Gosbeth (2) | 81 | 9–17 | 6–13 |
| 31 | April 18 | at UIC | Les Miller Field at Curtis Granderson Stadium • Chicago, Illinois | 4–11 | Nicholson (1–0) | Fee (0–2) | None | 70 | 9–18 | 6–14 |
| 32 | April 23 | at Ohio | Bob Wren Stadium • Athens, Ohio | 2–12 | Rock (7–1) | Pintarich (1–3) | None | – | 9–19 | 6–14 |
| 33 | April 24 | at Ohio | Bob Wren Stadium • Athens, Ohio | 2–5 | Kutt IV (5–2) | Myer (3–4) | None | – | 9–20 | 6–14 |
| 34 | April 25 | at Ohio | Bob Wren Stadium • Athens, Ohio | 1–9 | Jones (2–2) | Miller (3–5) | None | – | 9–21 | 6–14 |
| 35 | April 30 | Wright State | Mastodon Field • Fort Wayne, Indiana | 1–9 | Schrand (4–4) | Pintarich (1–4) | None | 81 | 9–22 | 6–15 |

May (2–13)

| # | Date | Opponent | Site/stadium | Score | Win | Loss | Save | Attendance | Overall record | Horizon record |
|---|---|---|---|---|---|---|---|---|---|---|
| 36 | May 1 | Wright State | Mastodon Field • Fort Wayne, Indiana | 2–22 | Brehmer (6–2) | Myer (3–5) | None | 98 | 9–23 | 6–16 |
| 37 | May 1 | Wright State | World Baseball Academy • Fort Wayne, Indiana | 7–28 | Shirk (3–0) | Miller (3–6) | None | 111 | 9–24 | 6–17 |
| 38 | May 2 | Wright State | World Baseball Academy • Fort Wayne, Indiana | 6–29 | Cline (6–1) | Boyd (0–5) | None | 147 | 9–25 | 6–18 |
| 39 | May 7 | at Youngstown State | Eastwood Field • Niles, Ohio | 2–6 | Floyd (7–3) | Fee (0–3) | None | 219 | 9–26 | 6–19 |
| 40 | May 7 | at Youngstown State | Eastwood Field • Niles, Ohio | 4–15 | Clark (5–5) | Pintarich (1–5) | None | 219 | 9–27 | 6–20 |
| 41 | May 8 | at Youngstown State | Eastwood Field • Niles, Ohio | 3–1 | Miller (4–6) | Clift Jr. (2–3) | Boyd (1) | 218 | 10–27 | 7–20 |
| 42 | May 8 | at Youngstown State | Eastwood Field • Niles, Ohio | 5–7 | Coles (2–2) | Boyd (0–6) | None | 218 | 10–28 | 7–21 |
| 43 | May 14 | UIC | Mastodon Field • Fort Wayne, Indiana | 7–22 | Key (6–3) | Pintarich (1–6) | None | 101 | 10–29 | 7–22 |
| 44 | May 15 | UIC | Mastodon Field • Fort Wayne, Indiana | 2–20 | Torres (6–1) | Myer (3–6) | None | 168 | 10–30 | 7–23 |
| 45 | May 15 | UIC | Mastodon Field • Fort Wayne, Indiana | 6–18 | O'Reilly (4–5) | Miller (4–7) | None | 177 | 10–31 | 7–24 |
| 46 | May 16 | UIC | Mastodon Field • Fort Wayne, Indiana | 0–10 | Conrad (1–0) | Boyd (0–7) | None | 143 | 10–32 | 7–25 |
| 47 | May 21 | at Oakland | Oakland Baseball Field • Rochester, Michigan | 12–4 | 'Miller (5–7) | Konitzer (3–2) | None | 33 | 11–32 | 8–25 |
| 48 | May 21 | at Oakland | Oakland Baseball Field • Rochester, Michigan | 13–17 | Densmore (3–4) | Armstrong (0–1) | Paugh (1) | 33 | 11–33 | 8–26 |
| 49 | May 22 | at Oakland | Oakland Baseball Field • Rochester, Michigan | 5–6 | Nierman (4–6) | Myer (3–7) | None | 88 | 11–34 | 8–27 |
| 50 | May 22 | at Oakland | Oakland Baseball Field • Rochester, Michigan | 10–17 | Trovinger (1–0) | Fee (0–4) | None | 88 | 11–35 | 8–28 |
