= 2021 The Citadel Bulldogs baseball team =

American college baseball season

2021 The Citadel Bulldogs baseball
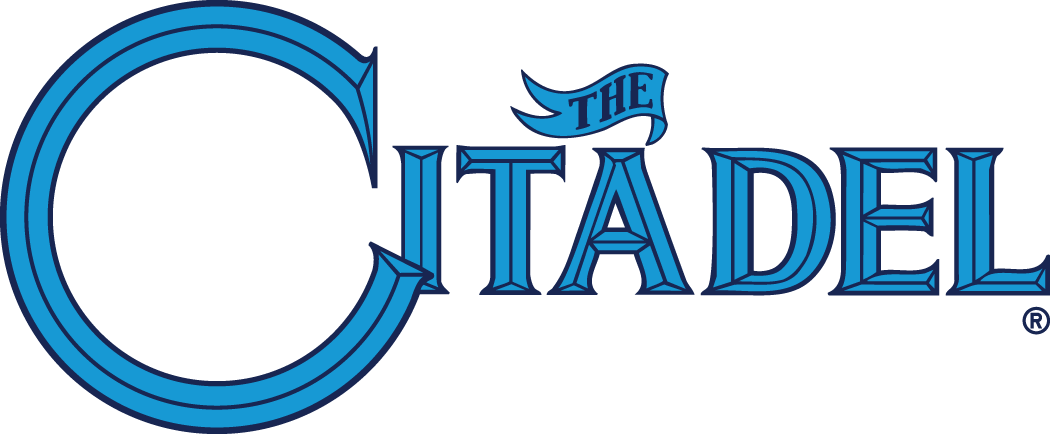
- Conference: Southern Conference
- Record: 12–39 (4–25 SoCon)
- Head coach: Tony Skole (4th season)
- Hitting coach: Zach Lucas (2nd season)
- Pitching coach: Blake Cooper (4th season)
- Home stadium: Joseph P. Riley Jr. Park

2021 Southern Conference baseball standings
	Conf.				Overall
Team	W		L	PCT	W		L	PCT
Blue
Samford ‍‍‡‍^{y}	20	–	10	.667	35	–	24	.593
East Tennessee State ‍‍‍	13	–	16	.448	24	–	25	.490
VMI ‍‍‍	13	–	17	.433	18	–	29	.383
UNC Greensboro ‍‍‍	12	–	18	.400	27	–	25	.519
Red
Wofford ‍‍‍	21	–	9	.700	36	–	21	.632
Mercer ‍‍‍	18	–	9	.667	35	–	22	.614
Western Carolina ‍‍‍	14	–	11	.560	28	–	21	.571
The Citadel ‍‍‍	4	–	25	.138	12	–	39	.235
‡ – Tournament champion y – Invited to the NCAA tournament As of June 5, 2021; Rankings from D1Baseball

2021 The Citadel Bulldogs baseball team represented The Citadel in the 2021 NCAA Division I baseball season. The Bulldogs played their home games at Joseph P. Riley Jr. Park in Charleston, South Carolina. The team was coached by Tony Skole, in his 4th season at The Citadel.

== Previous season ==
The Bulldogs finished the COVID-19 shortened season with a 10–6 record, including a 9–1 start.

== Personnel ==
=== Roster ===
2021 The Citadel Bulldogs baseball roster
Pitchers: 4 - Will Bastian - Sophomore; 13 - Zack Jones - Graduate Student; 15 - Cameron Reeves - Sophomore; 17 - Conner Cummiskey - Freshman; 18 - Lathan Todd - Sophomore; 19 - Brandon Mulier - Graduate Student; 24 - Gant Starling - Freshman; 25 - Jake Pilarski - Graduate Student; 31 - Caleb Speedy - Freshman; 33 - Devin Beckley - Junior; 35 - Harmon Cox - Freshman; 36 - Collier Mershon - Freshman; 37 - Simon Graf - Freshman; 38 - Logan Barker - Graduate Student; 39 - Chace Cooper - Freshman; 42 - Austin Blakely - (redshirt) Sophomore; Luke Kissenberth - Freshman; Rohan Shah - Freshman	Catchers: 9 - Ben Hutchins - Freshman; 14 - Travis Lott - Freshman; 28 - Logan Taplett - Graduate Student; 40 - Gray Sobel - Freshman; Infielders: 0 - Brooks O'Brien - Junior; 1 - Tyler Corbitt - Sophomore; 6 - Anthony Badala - Freshman; 10 - Crosby Jones - Freshman; 20 - Travis Elliott - Freshman; 21 - John Lanier - Freshman; 22 - Tilo Skole - (redshirt) Sophomore; 23 - Adam Colon - Junior; 30 - Sawyer Reeves - Freshman; 32 - Noah Mitchell - Freshman; 44 - Jeffrey Zeigler - Freshman; Antonio Colon - Freshman	Outfielders: 2 - Wesley Lane - Sophomore; 5 - Cam Jensen - (redshirt) Junior; 8 - Jeffery Brown - Senior; 12 - Ryan McCarthy - Junior; 34 - Cole Simpson - Sophomore; Grant Dowis - Freshman; Clay Wilson - Freshman; Utility: 3 - Luke Montenery - Freshman; 16 - Wyatt Spurrier - Freshman

=== Coaches ===
2021 The Citadel Bulldogs baseball coaching staff
- Tony Skole – Head coach – 4th year
- Zach Lucas – Assistant coach (hitting/recruiting) – 2nd year
- Blake Cooper – Assistant coach (pitching) – 4th year
- Jonathan Sabo – Volunteer assistant coach – 3rd year

== Schedule ==
Legend
	The Citadel win
	The Citadel loss
	Cancellation
**Bold**	The Citadel team member
*	Non-Conference game

2021 The Citadel Bulldogs baseball game log
Regular season

February
Date	Opponent	Site/stadium	Score	Win	Loss	Save	Attendance	Overall record	SoCon Record
Feb 19	Longwood*	Joseph P. Riley Jr. Park • Charleston, SC	**L** 5–12	D'Ercole (1–0)	**Pilarski (0–1)**	None	225	0–1	
Feb 20	Longwood*	Joseph P. Riley Jr. Park • Charleston, SC	**L** 2–4^{10}	Saale (1–0)	**Barker (0–1)**	Champagne (1)	375	0–2	
Feb 21	Longwood*	Joseph P. Riley Jr. Park • Charleston, SC	**W** 9–6	**Beckley (1–0)**	Brezner-Mendoza (0–1)	None	337	1–2	
Feb 26	North Florida*	Joseph P. Riley Jr. Park • Charleston, SC	**W** 8–4	**Pilarski (1–1)**	Roca (0–1)	**Starling (1)**	202	2–2	
Feb 27	North Florida*	Joseph P. Riley Jr. Park • Charleston, SC	**L** 2–3	Madonna (1–1)	**Jones (0–1)**	Miller (1)		2–3	
Feb 27	North Florida*	Joseph P. Riley Jr. Park • Charleston, SC	**L** 6–13	Jean (1–0)	**Lathan (0–1)**	None	303	2–4	

March
Date	Opponent	Site/stadium	Score	Win	Loss	Save	Attendance	Overall record	SoCon Record
Mar 3	at Jacksonville*	John Sessions Stadium • Jacksvonille, FL	**W** 7–6	**Graf (1–0)**	Brunnig (0–1)	**Starling (2)**	210	3–4	
Mar 5	North Carolina A&T*	Joseph P. Riley Jr. Park • Charleston, SC	**L** 6–7^{11}	Gates (1–0)	**Beckley (1–1)**	None	257	3–5	
Mar 6	North Carolina A&T*	Joseph P. Riley Jr. Park • Charleston, SC	**W** 7–6	**Reeves (1–0)**	Martinez (0–1)	**Starling (3)**	307	4–5	
Mar 7	North Carolina A&T*	Joseph P. Riley Jr. Park • Charleston, SC	**L** 1–12	Parks (2–0)	**Todd (0–2)**	None	337	4–6	
Mar 10	No. 12 South Carolina*	Joseph P. Riley Jr. Park • Charleston, SC	**L** 7–11	Peters (2–0)	**Barker (0–2)**	None	1,500	4–7	
Mar 12	Davidson*	Joseph P. Riley Jr. Park • Charleston, SC	**W** 2–0	**Cooper (1–0)**	Levy (1–2)	**Beckley (1)**	237	5–7	
Mar 13	Davidson*	Joseph P. Riley Jr. Park • Charleston, SC	**W** 19–0	**Reeves (2–0)**	Hely (2–1)	None	252	6–7	
Mar 14	Davidson*	Joseph P. Riley Jr. Park • Charleston, SC	**W** 8–4	**Todd (1–2)**	Fenton (0–3)	**Beckley (2)**	421	7–7	
Mar 19	Wofford	Joseph P. Riley Jr. Park • Charleston, SC	**W** 5–3	**Pilarski (2–1)**	Heinecke (2–3)	**Beckley (3)**		8–7	1–0
Mar 19	Wofford	Joseph P. Riley Jr. Park • Charleston, SC	**L** 4–5	Rhadans (2–0)	**Reeves (2–1)**	Schwaner (3)	507	8–8	1–1
Mar 20	Wofford	Joseph P. Riley Jr. Park • Charleston, SC	**L** 0–6	Carney (2–2)	**Todd (1–3)**	None	434	8–9	1–2
Mar 23	at No. 25 South Carolina	Founders Park • Columbia, SC	**L** 3–8	Sanders (3–1)	**Beckley (1–2)**	None	1,938	8–10	
Mar 26	at Western Carolina	Hennon Stadium • Cullowhee, NC	**L** 8–12	Matthews (3–1)	**Jones (0–2)**	Franklin (2)		8–11	1–3
Mar 26	at Western Carolina	Hennon Stadium • Cullowhee, NC	**L** 6–11	Corn (1–0)	**Reeves (2–2)**	None	100	8–12	1–4
Mar 27	at Western Carolina	Hennon Stadium • Cullowhee, NC	Cancelled						

April
Date	Opponent	Site/stadium	Score	Win	Loss	Save	Attendance	Overall record	SoCon Record
Apr 2	Mercer	Joseph P. Riley Jr. Park • Charleston, SC	**L** 2–12^{7}	Delano (3–0)	**Reeves (2–3)**	Non	423	8–13	1–5
Apr 3	Mercer	Joseph P. Riley Jr. Park • Charleston, SC	**L** 5–6	Lobus (4–2)	**Beckley (1–3)**	Sutko (4)		8–14	1–6
Apr 3	Mercer	Joseph P. Riley Jr. Park • Charleston, SC	**L** 2–12^{7}	Farmer (2–0)	**Todd (1–4)**	None	458	8–15	1–7
Apr 6	at College of Charleston*	CofC Baseball Stadium at Patriots Point • Mount Pleasant, SC	**L** 4–5	Carr (1–3)	**Reeves (2–4)**	None	624	8–16	
Apr 10	at Samford	Joe Lee Griffin Stadium • Birmingham, AL	**L** 11–12	Long (1–1)	**Reeves (2–5)**	None	174	8–17	1–8
Apr 10	at Samford	Joe Lee Griffin Stadium • Birmingham, AL	**L** 1–14	McCord (3–3)	**Jones (0–3)**	None	174	8–18	1–9
Apr 11	at Samford	Joe Lee Griffin Stadium • Birmingham, AL	**L** 4–8	Skinner (3–0)	**Reeves (2–6)**	None	113	8–19	1–10
Apr 14	Jacksonville*	Joseph P. Riley Jr. Park • Charleston, SC	**W** 3–2^{11}	**Graf (2–0)**	McCoy (1–3)	None	248	9–19	
Apr 16	East Tennessee State	Joseph P. Riley Jr. Park • Charleston, SC	**W** 5–4	**Reeves (3–6)**	Lloyd (4–2)	**Pilarski (1)**	229	10–19	2–10
Apr 17	East Tennessee State	Joseph P. Riley Jr. Park • Charleston, SC	**L** 2–7	Stuart (4–1)	**Jones (0–4)**	Bollenbacher (4)		10–20	2–11
Apr 17	East Tennessee State	Joseph P. Riley Jr. Park • Charleston, SC	**W** 6–4	**Todd (2–4)**	Acosta (0–2)	None	373	11–20	3–11
Apr 20	College of Charleston*	Joseph P. Riley Jr. Park • Charleston, SC	**L** 2–11	Privette (1–1)	**Beckley (2–4)**	None	147	11–21	
Apr 23	at UNC Greensboro	UNCG Baseball Stadium • Greensboro, NC	**L** 7–9	Koehn (2–2)	**Reeves (3–6)**	Stephens (3)	228	11–22	3–12
Apr 23	at UNC Greensboro	UNCG Baseball Stadium • Greensboro, NC	**L** 2–4	Parsley (4–2)	**Todd (2–5)**	None	228	11–23	3–13
Apr 24	at UNC Greensboro	UNCG Baseball Stadium • Greensboro, NC	**L** 1–14^{7}	Hoppe (1–2)	**Jones (0–5)**	None	123	11–24	3–14
Apr 27	at South Carolina	Founders Park • Columbia, SC	**L** 5–9	Mahoney (3–0)	**Todd (2–6)**	None	2,514	11–25	
Apr 30	VMI	Joseph P. Riley Jr. Park • Charleston, SC	**L** 5–13^{8}	Light (2–8)	**Pilarski (2–2)**	None	401	11–26	3–15

May
Date	Opponent	Site/stadium	Score	Win	Loss	Save	Attendance	Overall record	SoCon Record
May 1	VMI	Joseph P. Riley Jr. Park • Charleston, SC	**L** 5–9	Meders (4–2)	**Beckley (1–5)**	None		11–27	3–16
May 1	VMI	Joseph P. Riley Jr. Park • Charleston, SC	**L** 4–5	Morgan (2–2)	**Graf (2–1)**	None	617	11–28	3–17
May 5	Mississippi State	Joseph P. Riley Jr. Park • Charleston, SC	**L** 2–10	Smith (2–0)	**Reeves (2–8)**	None	1,173	11–29	
May 7	at Wofford	Russell C. King Field • Spartanburg, SC	**L** 2–11	Vitus (2–3)	**Todd (2–7)**	None	181	11–30	3–18
May 8	at Wofford	Russell C. King Field • Spartanburg, SC	**L** 10–11	Schwaner (5–0)	**Beckley (1–6)**	Rhadans (6)		11–31	3–19
May 8	at Wofford	Russell C. King Field • Spartanburg, SC	**L** 0–9	Carney (5–2)	**Reeves (2–9)**	None	243	11–32	3–20
May 11	College of Charleston*	Joseph P. Riley Jr. Park • Charleston, SC	**L** 3–6	Williams (2–0)	**Jones (0–6)**	Carr (3)	399	11–33	
May 14	at Mercer	OrthoGeorgia Park • Macon, GA	**L** 1–5	Delano (5–1)	**Pilarski (2–3)**	Sutko (10)	582	11–34	3–21
May 15	at Mercer	OrthoGeorgia Park • Macon, GA	**L** 5–8	Lobus (9–3)	**Reeves (3–10)**	Sutko (11)	576	11–35	3–22
May 15	at Mercer	OrthoGeorgia Park • Macon, GA	**W** 8–7	**Cooper (2–0)**	Sutko (3–5)	None	582	12–35	4–22
May 18	at College of Charleston	CofC Baseball Stadium at Patriots Point • Mount Pleasant, SC	**L** 3–10	Carr (3–3)	**Jones (0–7)**	None	504	12–36	
May 21	Western Carolina	Joseph P. Riley Jr. Park • Charleston, SC	**L** 1–2	Snyder (1–0)	**Pilarski (2–4)**	None	175	12–37	4–23
May 22	Western Carolina	Joseph P. Riley Jr. Park • Charleston, SC	**L** 3–6^{11}	Franklin (6–4)	**Todd (2–8)**	None		12–38	4–24
May 22	Western Carolina	Joseph P. Riley Jr. Park • Charleston, SC	**L** 0–21	Campbell (2–3)	**Blakely (0–1)**	None	277	12–39	4–25
