= 2021 Southern Conference baseball tournament =

- Teams: 4
- Format: Double-elimination
- Finals site: Fluor Field at the West End; Greenville, South Carolina
- Champions: Samford (3rd title)
- Winning coach: Casey Dunn (3rd title)
- MVP: Towns King (Samford)
- Television: SoCon DN; ESPN+ (Championship)

2021 Southern Conference baseball standings
	Conf.				Overall
Team	W		L	PCT	W		L	PCT
Blue
Samford ‍‍‡‍^{y}	20	–	10	.667	35	–	24	.593
East Tennessee State ‍‍‍	13	–	16	.448	24	–	25	.490
VMI ‍‍‍	13	–	17	.433	18	–	29	.383
UNC Greensboro ‍‍‍	12	–	18	.400	27	–	25	.519
Red
Wofford ‍‍‍	21	–	9	.700	36	–	21	.632
Mercer ‍‍‍	18	–	9	.667	35	–	22	.614
Western Carolina ‍‍‍	14	–	11	.560	28	–	21	.571
The Citadel ‍‍‍	4	–	25	.138	12	–	39	.235
‡ – Tournament champion y – Invited to the NCAA tournament As of June 5, 2021; Rankings from D1Baseball

The 2021 Southern Conference baseball tournament was held from May 27 through 29 at Fluor Field at the West End in Greenville, South Carolina. The annual event determines the conference champion of the Division I Southern Conference in college baseball. The tournament winner earns the league's bid to the 2021 NCAA Division I baseball tournament. This is the last of 20 athletic championships held by the conference in the 2020–21 academic year.

The tournament was originally held from 1950 to 1953, when the Southern Conference was a large conference composed of several small schools and several large schools, the latter of which would form the Atlantic Coast Conference after the 1953 season. The event was re-established in 1984 and has been held every year since with the exception of 2020 when the COVID-19 pandemic cancelled sporting events across the country. Western Carolina has claimed ten championships, the most of any school, with The Citadel close behind at eight tournament wins. Defending champion Mercer and Samford are the only other current schools with multiple championships, having each won two. East Tennessee State and VMI have never won a title, although they both returned to the conference in 2015 after over ten years in other conferences. Furman, which dropped its baseball program before the 2021 season, won two titles.

The tournament will be played in Greenville, which has hosted seven of the past eleven events, including the past four.

== Seeding and format ==
In a change from most years due to the ongoing COVID-19 pandemic, only four teams will participate. The top team from each division, and the next two teams by conference winning percentage, regardless of division, will qualify.

== Bracket ==
First round
1	Wofford	5
4	Western Carolina	16
2	Samford	10
3	Mercer	8
Lower round 1
1	Wofford	8
3	Mercer	7

Semi-finals
4	Western Carolina	7
2	Samford	19
Lower final
1	Wofford	6
4	Western Carolina	11

Finals
2	Samford	8	-
4	Western Carolina	6	-
