= Steve Joslyn =

American baseball coach

Biographical details
- Born: 1963 or 1964
- Education: North Central College

Coaching career (HC unless noted)
- 1986: Aurora (assistant)
- 1996–2002: North Central (assistant)
- 2003–2012: Northern Illinois (assistant)
- 2013–2020: Chicago State

Head coaching record
- Overall: 89–303–1
- Tournaments: Great West: 2–2

Steven W. Joslyn in an American college baseball coach.

After completing a degree in physical education at North Central College, Joslyn began coaching as an assistant baseball coach at Aurora in 1986 before becoming a basketball, football, and baseball assistant coach at a series of Illinois high schools. in 1996, he returned to the college ranks as an assistant baseball coach at his alma mater, North Central. He moved to Northern Illinois in 2003 to work for Ed Mathey. After a promotion to Associate Head Coach in 2008, Joslyn accepted the head coaching position at Chicago State University. He held that position until the conclusion of the 2020 season when the school's baseball program was discontinued.

== Head coaching record ==
The following table shows Joslyn's record as a college head coach.

Record table
Season	Team	Overall	Conference	Standing	Postseason
Chicago State Cougars (Great West Conference) (2013)
2013	Chicago State	10–45	5–23	8th	Great West Tournament (Note: All eight of the Great West's teams qualified for the tournament in 2013.)
Chicago State Cougars (Western Athletic Conference) (2014–2020)
2014	Chicago State	17–37	5–19	9th	
2015	Chicago State	13–40–1	6–19–1	9th	
2016	Chicago State	13–42	6–21	9th	
2017	Chicago State	11–41	7–17	T-8th	
2018	Chicago State	13–41	7–17	8th	
2019	Chicago State	10–41	5–22	10th	
2020	Chicago State	2–16	0–0		Season canceled due to COVID-19
Chicago State:		89–303–1	41–138–1		
Total:		89–303–1			
National champion Postseason invitational champion Conference regular season champion Conference regular season and conference tournament champion Division regular season champion Division regular season and conference tournament champion Conference tournament champion
