= 2021 Horizon League baseball tournament =

- Teams: 4
- Format: Double-elimination
- Finals site: Nischwitz Stadium; Fairborn, Ohio
- Champions: Wright State (7th title)
- Winning coach: Alex Sogard (1st title)
- MVP: Damon Dues (Wright State)
- Television: ESPN+

2021 Horizon League baseball standings
| | Conf. | | | | Overall |
| Team | W | | L | PCT | W | | L | PCT |
|---|---|---|---|---|---|---|---|---|
| Wright State ‍†‍‡‍^{y} | 28 | – | 4 | .875 | 35 | – | 13 | .729 |
| UIC ‍‍‍ | 28 | – | 11 | .718 | 30 | – | 18 | .625 |
| Youngstown State ‍‍‍ | 24 | – | 16 | .600 | 32 | – | 24 | .571 |
| Milwaukee ‍‍‍ | 17 | – | 23 | .425 | 22 | – | 33 | .400 |
| Oakland ‍‍‍ | 13 | – | 23 | .361 | 19 | – | 28 | .404 |
| Northern Kentucky ‍‍‍ | 14 | – | 25 | .359 | 17 | – | 31 | .354 |
| Purdue Fort Wayne ‍‍‍ | 7 | – | 29 | .194 | 10 | – | 36 | .217 |
† – Conference champion ‡ – Tournament champion y – Invited to the NCAA tournament As of June 5, 2021; Rankings from D1Baseball

The 2021 Horizon League baseball tournament was held from May 27 through 29 at Nischwitz Stadium in Fairborn, Ohio, on the campus of Wright State University. The annual tournament determines the tournament champion of Division I Horizon League in college baseball. The tournament champion will then earn the conference's automatic bid to the 2021 NCAA Division I baseball tournament.

== Tournament ==
=== Bracket ===
Thursday, May 27
1 | Wright State | 4
4 | Milwaukee | 3
Winner's bracket
3 | Youngstown State | 4
2 | UIC | 7
4 | Milwaukee | 9
3 | Youngstown State | 6
Loser's bracket

Friday, May 28
1 | Wright State | 15
2 | UIC | 4
2 | UIC | 11
4 | Milwaukee | 14^{11}

Saturday, May 29
1 | Wright State | 21 | –
4 | Milwaukee | 3 | –
