= Franklin Field (Wisconsin) =

Baseball stadium in Milwaukee, Wisconsin, U.S.

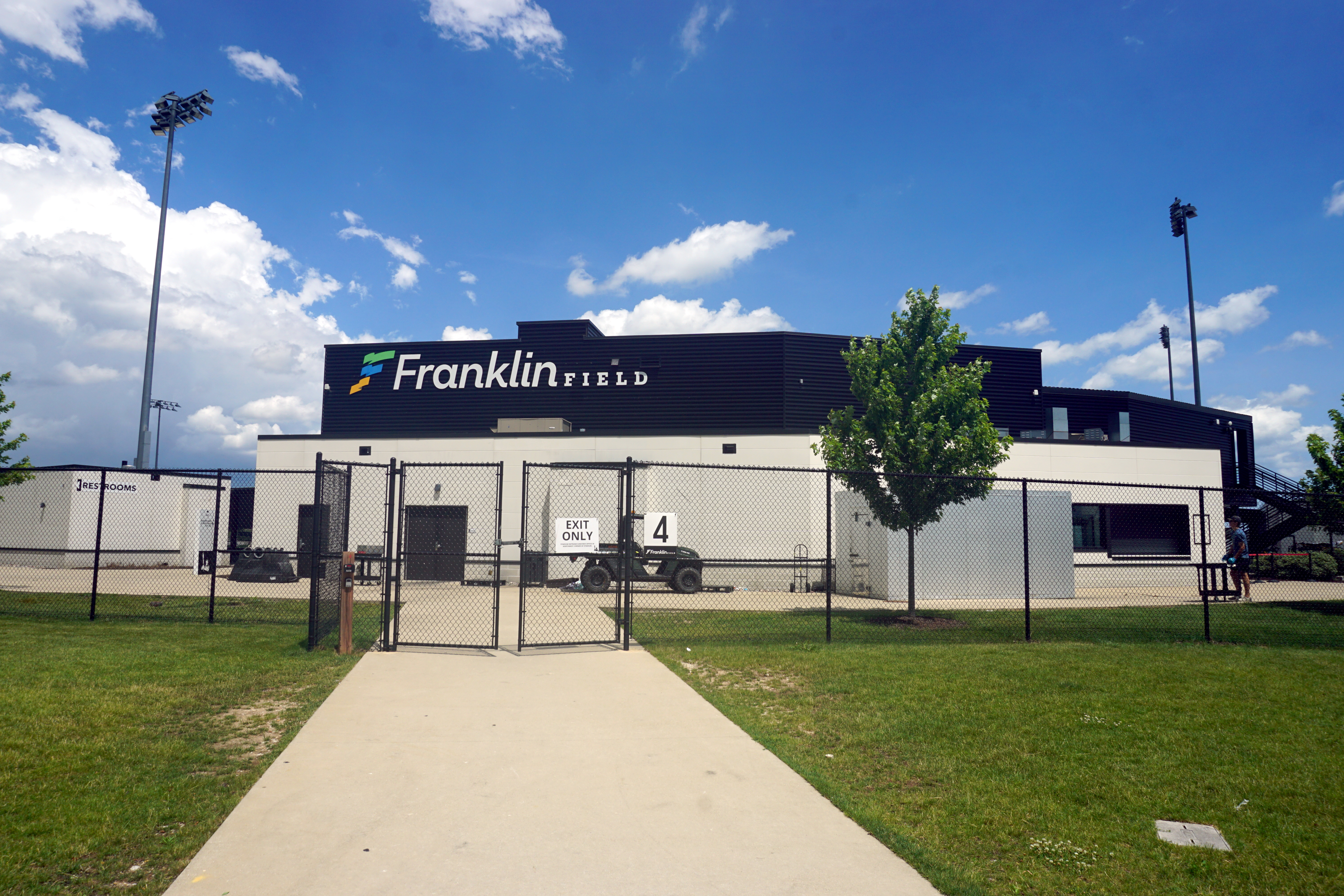

- Location within Wisconsin Franklin Field (the United States)
- Interactive map of Franklin Field
- Former names: Ballpark Commons (planning stages); Routine Field (2019); Milkmen Stadium (2020 preseason)
- Address: 7035 S. Ballpark Drive; Franklin, Wisconsin
- Coordinates: 42°55′07″N 88°0′59″W
- Owner: ROC Ventures
- Capacity: 4,000
- Surface: Turf
- Field size: Left field: 330 ft (100 m); Center field: 408 ft (124 m); Right field: 330 ft (100 m)

Construction
- Groundbreaking: June 7, 2018
- Opened: June 24, 2019
- Cost: $15 million
- General contractor: Marso Construction

Tenants
- Milwaukee Milkmen (AA) 2019–present Milwaukee Panthers (NCAA) 2020–present

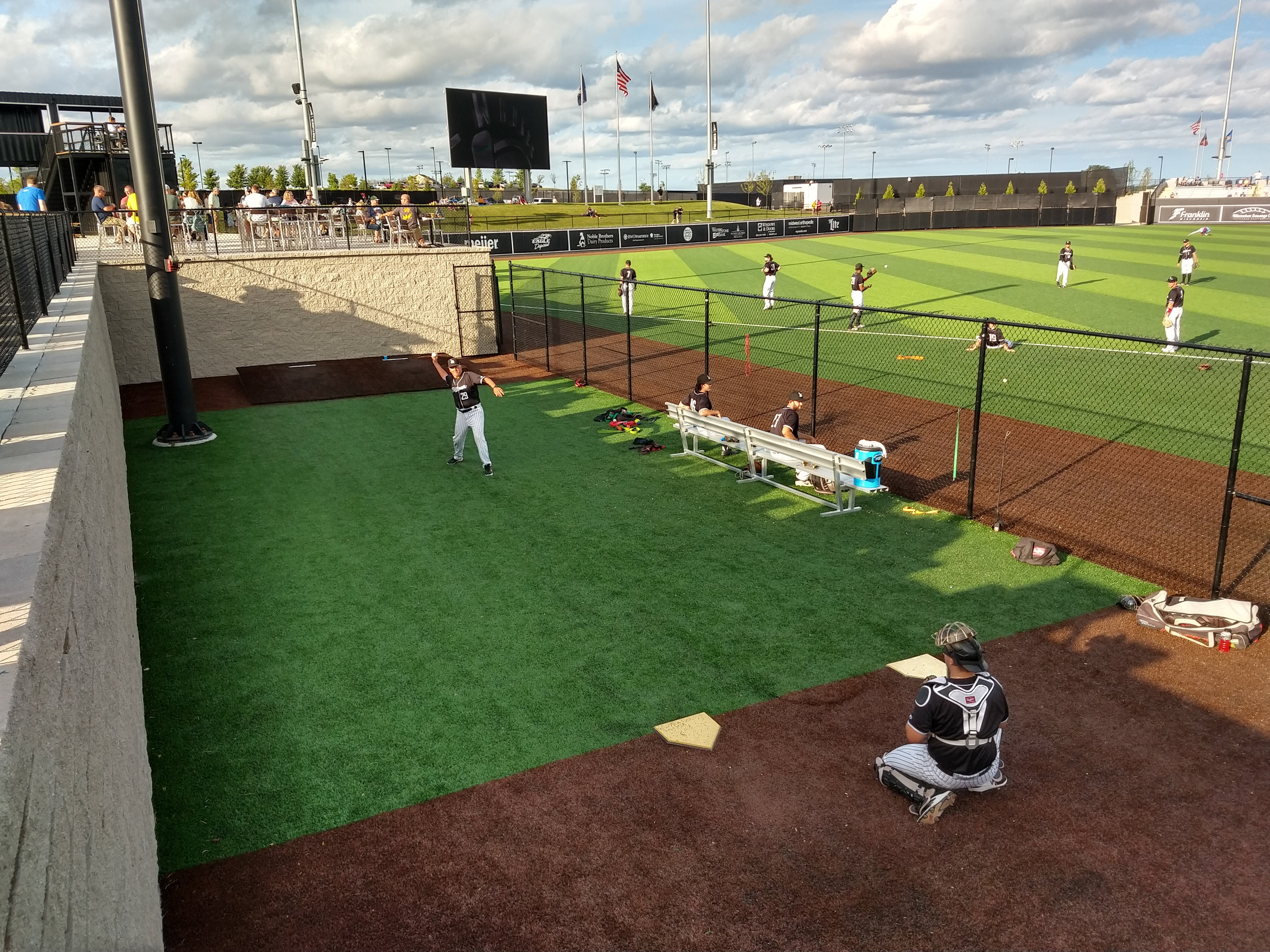
Milkmen warming up

Franklin Field (formerly known as Routine Field and briefly as Milkmen Stadium) is a baseball park in Franklin, Wisconsin, which is part of the Milwaukee metropolitan area. The ballpark was built on the site of a former landfill. It is the home field of the Milwaukee Milkmen, an independent professional baseball team in the American Association of Professional Baseball, and the University of Wisconsin-Milwaukee Panthers baseball team, in the NCAA Division I Horizon League; the Panthers are the only Division I collegiate baseball program in the state.

Finishing touches on the ballpark were disrupted by construction delays and severe winter weather in early 2019, meaning the Milkmen had to play their first home games that season at Kokomo Municipal Stadium in Indiana; Franklin Field opened on June 24, 2019 with the Gary SouthShore RailCats defeating the Milkmen 3-2 in 11 innings.

== Naming rights dispute ==
The naming rights were originally held by Routine Baseball, a baseball apparel brand based in Franklin. However, in August 2019, Routine Baseball filed a lawsuit against ROC Ventures, arguing that the letter of intent outlining the terms of the naming-rights deal was never officially signed and that ROC Ventures should not have moved forward with the deal. They claimed ROC Ventures never had formal permission to use and profit off its branding, and in addition owed them more than $100,000 in unpaid invoices. Later, ROC Ventures filed a countersuit, alleging that Routine not only failed to pay naming rights, but also did not pay royalties or commitments due after Routine took over Lifestyle Sports Apparel and Korked (a ROC Ventures enterprise that created apparel for Joe Maddon's foundation). In November, the two parties reached a settlement and all Routine branding and signage was removed from the ballpark. In January 2020, the Milkmen were actively searching for a new naming-rights partner. In June 2020, ROC Ventures announced it had forged a partnership with the Franklin Tourism Commission to rename the ballpark from Milkmen Stadium to Franklin Field and build a visitor center nearby.

In May 2021, Wisconsin Lutheran College held a commencement ceremony for their winter 2020 and spring 2021 graduates at Franklin Field.
