= Liberty Flames baseball statistical leaders =

The Liberty Flames baseball statistical leaders are individual statistical leaders of the Liberty Flames baseball program in various categories, including batting average, home runs, runs batted in, runs, hits, stolen bases, ERA, and Strikeouts. Within those areas, the lists identify single-game, single-season, and career leaders. The Flames represent Liberty University in the NCAA's Conference USA.

Liberty began competing in intercollegiate baseball in 1974. These lists are updated through the end of the 2025 season.

== Batting Average ==
Career (min. 300 AB)
Rk	Player	AVG	Seasons
1	Sid Bream	.437	1979 1980 1981
2	Renard Brown	.376	1980 1981 1982
3	Curran Redal	.365	2009 2010
4	Cary McKay	.364	1988 1989 1990
5	Marcus Maringola	.363	1999 2000 2001 2002
6	Kelly Knouse	.359	2000 2001 2002
7	Darrell Manuel	.358	1980 1981 1982 1983
8	Chris Robbins	.357	1988 1989 1990 1991
9	Jeremiah Boles	.355	2003 2004
10	Larry Wayne York	.354	2000 2001 2002 2003

Season (min. 150 AB)
Rk	Player	AVG	Season
1	Sid Bream	.443	1979
2	Sid Bream	.436	1980
3	Sid Bream	.430	1981
4	Cary McKay	.419	1989
5	Renard Brown	.409	1982
6	David Dalton	.408	1998
7	Keith Butler	.406	2000
8	Kelly Knouse	.405	2002
9	Marcus Maringola	.404	2002
10	Jim Bevins	.402	1983

== Home Runs ==
Career
Rk	Player	HR	Seasons
1	Pat Sipe	59	1983 1984 1985 1986
2	Steve Wright	43	1995 1996 1997 1998
3	Sid Bream	36	1979 1980 1981
4	Alex Close	33	2012 2013 2014 2015
	Logan Mathieu	33	2018 2019 2021 2022
6	Steve Baker	31	1999 2000 2001 2002
7	Joey Monahan	29	2000 2001 2002
8	Brady Gulakowski	28	2020 2021 2022
	Matt Hagen	28	2000 2001 2002
	Ryan McClellan	28	1996 1997 1998 1999
	Trey Miller	28	1998 1999 2000 2001

Season
Rk	Player	HR	Season
1	Pat Sipe	20	1986
2	Sid Bream	19	1981
3	Matt Hagen	18	2002
	Steve Wright	18	1998
	Pat Sipe	18	1985
6	Brady Gulakowski	16	2022
	Joey Monahan	16	2002
8	Derek Orndorff	15	2022
	Logan Mathieu	15	2021
10	Jason Baker	14	1995
	Alex Close	14	2012
	Jax Sorenson	14	2025

Single Game
Rk	Player	HR	Season	Opponent
1	Sid Bream	4	1981	Penn State-Behrend

== Runs Batted In ==
Career
Rk	Player	RBI	Seasons
1	Pat Sipe	226	1983 1984 1985 1986
2	Steve Wright	184	1995 1996 1997 1998
3	Phillip Laurent	181	2003 2004 2005 2006
4	Sid Bream	166	1979 1980 1981
	Alex Close	166	2012 2013 2014 2015
6	P.K. Keller	160	2005 2006 2007 2008
7	Steve Baker	158	1999 2000 2001 2002
	Logan Mathieu	158	2018 2019 2021 2022
9	Darrell Manuel	149	1980 1981 1982 1983
10	Tyler Bream	147	2009 2010 2011

Season
Rk	Player	RBI	Season
1	Sid Bream	83	1981
2	Steve Wright	79	1998
3	Phillip Laurent	73	2006
4	Pat Sipe	70	1985
5	Matt Hagen	64	2002
	Pat Sipe	64	1986
7	Brady Gulakowski	63	2022
	Marcus Maringola	63	2002
9	Phillip Laurent	62	2004
	Jim Bevins	62	1983

Single Game
Rk	Player	RBI	Season	Opponent
1	Tyler Bream	9	2009	High Point
	Pat Sipe	9	1986	Richmond

== Runs ==
Career
Rk	Player	R	Seasons
1	Pat Sipe	179	1983 1984 1985 1986
2	D.J. Artis	173	2016 2017 2018
	Gray Betts	173	2019 2020 2021 2022 2023
4	Joey Monahan	171	2000 2001 2002
5	Keith Butler	169	2000 2001 2002
6	Aaron Grijalva	168	2005 2006 2007 2008
7	Trey Miller	164	1998 1999 2000 2001
8	Tanner Marsh	162	2024 2025 2026
9	Ken Tomlin	160	1983 1984 1985 1986
10	Mark deYmaz	159	1981 1982 1983

Season
Rk	Player	R	Season
1	Tanner Marsh	70	2026
2	Chad Miller	68	2006
3	Ian Parmley	66	2012
4	Michael Just	64	2006
5	Renard Brown	63	1981
6	Keith Butler	62	2002
	Mark deYmaz	62	1981
8	Derek Orndorff	61	2022
	D.J. Artis	61	2018
	P.J. Jimenez	61	2010
	Jeremiah Boles	61	2004
	Joey Monahan	61	2002
	Jason Benham	61	1998

Single Game
Rk	Player	R	Season	Opponent
1	Patrick Gaillard	5	2007	Richmond
	Matt Hagen	5	2001	Coastal Carolina
	John Barrick	5	1985	Radford
	Mark deYmaz	5	1981	Robert Morris

== Hits ==
Career
Rk	Player	H	Seasons
1	Phillip Laurent	280	2003 2004 2005 2006
2	Gray Betts	262	2019 2020 2021 2022 2023
	Larry Wayne York	262	2000 2001 2002 2003
4	Alex Close	258	2012 2013 2014 2015
5	Dalton Britt	249	2013 2014 2015 2016
6	P.K. Keller	248	2005 2006 2007 2008
7	Michael Just	247	2003 2004 2005 2006
8	Errol Hollinger	245	2006 2007 2008 2009
9	Jason Benham	242	1995 1996 1997 1998
10	Pat Sipe	239	1983 1984 1985 1986

Season
Rk	Player	H	Season
1	Tyler Bream	96	2010
2	Michael Just	94	2006
3	P.J. Jimenez	92	2010
	Jason Benham	92	1998
5	Curran Redal	90	2010
	Phillip Laurent	90	2006
	Jeremiah Boles	90	2004
8	Keith Butler	89	2000
9	Tanner Marsh	88	2026
10	Matt Williams	85	2010

Single Game
Rk	Player	H	Season	Opponent
1	Kane Kepley	6	2023	Eastern Kentucky
	Jake Hines	6	1993	William & Mary

== Stolen Bases ==
Career
Rk	Player	SB	Seasons
1	Joey Monahan	85	2000 2001 2002
2	D.J. Artis	72	2016 2017 2018
	Larry Wayne York	72	2000 2001 2002 2003
4	Keith Butler	67	2000 2001 2002
5	Darrell Manuel	60	1980 1981 1982 1983
	Ken Tomlin	60	1983 1984 1985 1986
7	Ian Parmley	57	2011 2012
8	Steve Younts	56	1980 1981 1982 1983
9	Aaron Grijalva	55	2005 2006 2007 2008
10	Trey Miller	50	1998 1999 2000 2001

Season
Rk	Player	SB	Season
1	Gary Wagner	46	1983
2	Keith Butler	35	2000
3	Joey Monahan	34	2000
4	Jeremiah Boles	31	2004
5	Ian Parmley	30	2012
6	Darrell Manuel	29	1983
7	Ryan Cordell	28	2013
8	Ian Parmley	27	2011
	Larry Wayne York	27	2003
10	D.J. Artis	26	2018
	Joey Monahan	26	2001
	David Dalton	26	1998

Single Game
Rk	Player	SB	Season	Opponent
1	Gary Wagner	6	1983	Allentown

== Earned Run Average ==
Career (145 inn. min.)
Rk	Player	ERA	Seasons
1	Trey Lambert	2.79	2012 2013 2014
2	Jared Lyons	2.83	2012 2013 2014 2015
3	John Niggli	2.86	2011 2012
4	Marc Leatherwood	2.90	1978 1979 1980 1981
5	Joe Adametz III	3.04	2019 2020 2022
6	Lee Guetterman	3.07	1978 1979 1980 1981
7	Shawn Clowers	3.08	2012 2013 2014 2015
8	Tim Bickers	3.18	1993 1994 1995 1996
9	Shawn Teufel	3.22	2006 2007 2008 2009 2010
10	Frank Speek	3.26	1987 1988 1989 1990

Season (min. 50 IP)
Rk	Player	ERA	Season
1	Shawn Clowers	0.83	2014
2	Doug Smith	1.38	1980
3	Tim Bickers	1.91	1995
4	Lee Guetterman	1.92	1980
5	Garrett Horn	1.93	2022
6	Jared Lyons	1.99	2015
7	Keegan Linza	2.08	2011
8	Trevor DeLaite	2.17	2021
	John Niggli	2.17	2012
10	Trey Lambert	2.23	2014

== Strikeouts ==
Career
Rk	Player	K	Seasons
1	Mike Brown	287	1994 1995 1996 1997
2	Steven Evans	268	2008 2009 2010 2011
3	Ben Blair	249	2024 2025 2026
4	Tim Harrell	242	1995 1996 1997 1998
5	David Bechtold	241	2002 2003 2004 2005
6	Dustin Umberger	230	2006 2007 2008 2009 2010
7	Garret Price	225	2017 2018 2019 2020
8	Benji Miller	224	1995 1996 1997 1998
9	Jared Lyons	221	2012 2013 2014 2015
10	Lee Guetterman	220	1978 1979 1980 1981

Season
Rk	Player	K	Season
1	Benji Miller	119	1998
2	Ben Blair	113	2026
3	Andrew McInvale	101	2019
4	Jared Lyons	100	2015
	Dan Valentin	100	2000
6	Noah Skirrow	98	2019
7	Mike Brown	95	1997
8	Cole Hertzler	94	2024
	Ben Blair	94	2025
10	Frank Speek	93	1990

Single Game
Rk	Player	K	Season	Opponent
1	Benji Miller	20	1998	Coastal Carolina
