= 2022 Liberty Flames baseball team =

American college baseball season

2022 Liberty Flames baseball

NCAA tournament, Gainesville Regional
- Conference: ASUN Conference
- Record: 37–23 (19–11 ASUN)
- Head coach: Scott Jackson (6th season)
- Home stadium: Liberty Baseball Stadium

2022 ASUN Conference baseball standings
	Conf.				Overall
Team	W		L	PCT	W		L	PCT
East
Kennesaw State ^{x}‍‍‡‍^{y}	19	–	11	.633	35	–	26	.574
Liberty ^{x}‍‍‍^{y}	19	–	11	.633	37	–	21	.638
Florida Gulf Coast ‍‍‍	17	–	13	.567	35	–	23	.603
Jacksonville ‍‍‍	13	–	16	.448	27	–	28	.491
North Florida ‍‍‍	11	–	18	.379	22	–	33	.400
Stetson ‍‍‍	10	–	20	.333	26	–	29	.473
West
Eastern Kentucky ^{x}‍‍‍	20	–	10	.667	38	–	20	.655
Lipscomb ^{x}‍‍‍	20	–	10	.667	35	–	23	.603
Jacksonville State ‍‍‍	19	–	11	.633	27	–	28	.491
Central Arkansas ‍‍‍	18	–	12	.600	24	–	29	.453
Bellarmine ‍‍‍	8	–	22	.267	11	–	43	.204
North Alabama ‍‍‍	5	–	25	.167	12	–	41	.226
x – Division champion ‡ – Tournament champion y – Invited to the NCAA tournament Rankings from D1Baseball

The 2022 Liberty Flames baseball team represented Liberty University during the 2022 NCAA Division I baseball season. The Flames played their home games at Liberty Baseball Stadium as members of the Atlantic Sun Conference They were led by sixth-year head coach Scott Jackson.

== Game log ==
Legend
	Liberty win
	Liberty loss
	Postponement
**Bold**	Liberty team member

2022 Liberty Flames baseball game log (37–23)
Regular season

February (6–1)
Date	Time	Opponent	Rank	Site/stadium	Score	Win	Loss	Save	TV	Attendance	Overall record	ASUN Record
February 18	7:00 pm	at No. 9 Florida*		Florida Ballpark; Gainesville, FL	**L** 2–7	Hunter Barco (1–0)	**Joe Adametz III (0–1)**	Ryan Slater (1)	SECN+	6,463	0–1	—
February 19	4:00 pm	at No. 9 Florida*		Florida Ballpark	**W** 6–4	**David Erickson (1–0)**	Brandon Sproat (0–1)	Cade Hungate (1)	SECN+	6,350	1–1	—
February 20	12:00 pm	at No. 9 Florida*		Florida Ballpark	**W** 5–3	**Jeremy Beamon (1–0)**	Philip Abner (0–1)	Cade Hungate (2)	SECN+	5,377	2–1	—
February 23	4:00 p.m.	North Carolina A&T*	No. 21	Liberty Baseball Stadium; Lynchburg, VA	**W** 12–2	**Garrett Horn (1–0)**	Evan DeMurias (0–1)	—		1,263	3–1	—
February 25	4:00 pm	Winthrop*	No. 21	Liberty Baseball Stadium	**W** 8–1	**Joe Adametz III (1–1)**	Parker Whittle (0–1)	**David Erickson (1)**	ESPN+	1,278	4–1	—
February 26	2:00 pm	Winthrop*	No. 21	Liberty Baseball Stadium	**W** 8–1	**Trey Gibson (1–0)**	Reese Lumpkin (0–1)	—	ESPN+	1,089	5–1	—
February 27	1:00 pm	Winthrop*	No. 21	Liberty Baseball Stadium	**W** 13–2	**Max Alba (1–0)**	Tyler Jones (0–2)	—	ESPN+	983	6–1	—

March (10–6)
Date	Time	Opponent	Rank	Site/stadium	Score	Win	Loss	Save	TV	Attendance	Overall record	ASUN Record
March 1	4:00 pm	at Radford*	No. 20	Carter Memorial Stadium; Radford, VA	**W** 11–3	**Garrett Horn (2–0)**	Gene McGough (0–2)	—	LUTV	100	7–1	—
March 4	4:00 pm	Canisius*	No. 20	Liberty Baseball Stadium	**W** 4–1	**Joe Adametz III (2–1)**	Matt Duffy (2–1)	**Cade Hungate (3)**	ESPN+	1,050	8–1	—
March 5	2:00 pm	Canisius*	No. 20	Liberty Baseball Stadium	**W** 14–3	**Trey Gibson (2–0)**	Aaron Duffy (0–2)	—	ESPN+	1,255	9–1	—
March 6	1:00 pm	Canisius*	No. 20	Liberty Baseball Stadium	**W** 14–5	**Max Alba (2–0)**	Chris Pouliot (1–1)	—	ESPN+	1,135	10–1	—
March 8	4:00 pm	No. 15 North Carolina*	No. 14	Liberty Baseball Stadium	**W** 1–0	**Mason Fluharty (1–0)**	Connor Bovair (1–1)	**Cade Hungate (4)**	ESPN+	2,692	11–1	—
March 11	4:00 pm	Campbell*	No. 14	Liberty Baseball Stadium	**L** 0–7	Thomas Harrington (3–1)	**Joe Adametz III (2–2)**	—	ESPN+	1,171	11–2	—
March 12	2:00 pm	Campbell*	No. 14	Liberty Baseball Stadium	**Canceled (inclement weather)**							
March 13	1:00 pm	Campbell*	No. 14	Liberty Baseball Stadium	**W** 5–3	**Mason Fluharty (2–0)**	Ty Cummings (1–1)	**Cade Hungate (5)**	ESPN+	708	12–2	—
March 15	3:00 pm	at VCU*	No. 14	The Diamond; Richmond, VA	**L** 1–2	Nolan Wilson (2–0)	**Mason Fluharty (2–1)**	—	ESPN+	424	12–3	—
March 18	1:00 pm	at North Florida	No. 14	Harmon Stadium; Jacksonville, FL	**L** 2–5	Max McKinley (2–1)	**David Erickson (1–1)**	Stephen Halstead (2)	WQLU		12–4	0–1
March 19	4:15 pm	at North Florida	No. 14	Harmon Stadium	**W** 11–5	**Trey Gibson (3–0)**	Zach Chappell (0–3)	—	WQLU	396	13–4	1–1
March 20	1:00 pm	at North Florida	No. 14	Harmon Stadium	**W** 7–5	**Mason Fluharty (3–1)**	Tony Roca (0–3)	**Cade Hungate (6)**	WQLU	457	14–4	2–1
March 22	4:00 pm	Wake Forest*	No. 15	Liberty Baseball Stadium	**L** 6–13	Gabe Golob (1–0)	**Dylan Cumming (0–1)**	—	ESPN+	1561	14–5	—
March 25	6:00 pm	Stetson	No. 15	Liberty Baseball Stadium	**W** 4–3	**Cade Hungate (1–0)**	Austin Amaral (1–1)	—	ESPN+	1434	15–5	3–1
March 26	4:45 pm	Stetson	No. 15	Liberty Baseball Stadium	**L** 3–5	Jonathan Gonzalez (3–3)	**Trey Gibson (3–1)**	Rasesh Pandya (2)	ESPN+	1141	15–6	3–2
March 27	11:00 am	Stetson	No. 15	Liberty Baseball Stadium	**L** 1–7	Cole Stallings (4–1)	**Max Alba (2–1)**	—	ESPN+	805	15–7	3–3
March 29	4:00 pm	at Duke*	—	Durham Bulls Athletic Park; Durham, NC	**W** 9–2	**Jeremy Beamon (2–0)**	Jonathan Santucci (0–1)	—	ACCNX	349	16–7	—

April (11–7)
Date	Time	Opponent	Rank	Site/stadium	Score	Win	Loss	Save	TV	Attendance	Overall record	ASUN Record
April 1	7:00 pm	at Jacksonville	—	John Sessions Stadium; Jacksonville, FL	**L** 1–6	Mason Adams (4–0)	**Garrett Horn (2–1)**	—	WQLU	286	16–8	3–4
April 2	7:30 pm	at Jacksonville	—	John Sessions Stadium	**W** 6–2	**Dylan Cumming (1–1)**	Michael Darrell-Hicks (0–3)	—	WQLU	224	17–8	4–4
April 3	1:00 pm	at Jacksonville	—	John Sessions Stadium	**L** 7–11	Tyler Vogel (2–0)	**Trey Gibson (3–2)**	—	WQLU	316	17–9	4–5
April 6	7:00 pm	at Virginia	—	Davenport Field; Charlottesville, VA	**L** 2–7	Devin Ortiz (5–1)	**Trey Gibson (3–3)**	—	ACCNX	3106	17–10	—
April 8	6:00 pm	Florida Gulf Coast	—	Liberty Baseball Stadium	**W** 11–3	**Garrett Horn (3–1)**	Jason Woodward (3–3)	—	ESPN+	1937	18–10	5–5
April 9	4:00 pm	Florida Gulf Coast	—	Liberty Baseball Stadium	**W** 8–3	**Dylan Cumming (2–1)**	Tyler Shuck (4–2)	—	ESPN+	1439	19–10	6–5
April 10	11:00 am	Florida Gulf Coast	—	Liberty Baseball Stadium	**W** 8–2	**Joe Adametz III (3–2)**	Tyler Tipton (2–2	—	ESPN+	826	20–10	7–5
April 12	6:00 pm	Virginia Tech*	—	Liberty Baseball Stadium	**L** 6–10	Jonah Hurney (2–1)	**Tim Miller (0–1)**	Ryan Metz (1)	ESPN+	2703	20–11	—
April 14	6:00 pm	at Kennesaw State	—	Fred Stillwell Stadium; Kenensaw, GA	**W** 9–2	**Garrett Horn (4–1)**	Jack Myers (3–2)	**Trey Carter (1)**	WQLU	417	21–11	8–5
April 15	1:00 pm	at Kennesaw State	—	Fred Stillwell Stadium	**W** 18–3	**Dylan Cumming (3–1)**	Brayden Eidson (3–1)	—	WQLU	386	22–11	9–5
April 16	4:00 pm	at Kennesaw State	—	Fred Stillwell Stadium	**L** 8–9	Jared Rine (3–0)	**Cole Garrett (0–1)**	—	WQLU	551	22–12	9–6
April 19	6:00 pm	Duke*	—	Liberty Baseball Stadium	**W** 3–2	**Trey Carter (1–0)**	Jimmy Loper (3–2)	—	ESPN+	1468	23–12	—
April 22	6:00 pm	North Florida	—	Liberty Baseball Stadium	**W** 22–4	**Garrett Horn (5–1)**	Max McKinley (2–4)	—	ESPN+	1487	24–12	10–6
April 23	4:00 pm	North Florida	—	Liberty Baseball Stadium	**W** 5–4	**Dylan Cumming (4–1)**	Peter Holden (2–2)	**Mason Fluharty (1)**	ESPN+	1546	25–12	11–6
April 24	1:00 pm	North Florida	—	Liberty Baseball Stadium	**W** 10–9	**Cade Hungate (2–0)**	Stephen Halstead (2–3)	—	ESPN+	1006	26–12	12–6
April 26	4:00 pm	at North Carolina*	—	Boshamer Stadium; Chapel Hill, NC	**L** 1–8	Brandon Schaeffer (4–1)	**Trey Gibson (3–4)**	—	ACCNX	2004	26–13	—
April 29	6:30 pm	at Stetson	—	Melching Field; DeLand, FL	**W** 2–1	**Trey Carter (2–0)**	Austin Amaral (2–2)	—	ESPN+	679	27–13	13–6
April 30	6:30 pm	at Stetson	—	Melching Field	**L** 1–5	Chris Gonzalez (1–3)	**Dylan Cumming (4–2)**	—	ESPN+	744	27–14	13–7

May (6–6)
Date	Time	Opponent	Rank	Site/stadium	Score	Win	Loss	Save	TV	Attendance	Overall record	ASUN Record
May 1	12:00 pm	at Stetson	—	Melching Field	**W** 8–0	**Joe Adametz III (4–2)**	Cole Stallings (5–4)	—	ESPN+	672	28–14	14–7
May 3	6:00 pm	at Wake Forest*	—	David F. Couch Ballpark; Winston-Salem, NC	**L** 5–10	Wade Crawford (3–0)	**Mason Fluharty (3–2)**	—	ACCNX	1070	28–15	—
May 6	2:25 pm	Jacksonville		Liberty Baseball Stadium	**W** 7–5	**Garrett Horn (6–1)**	Mason Adams (4–3)	**Cade Hungate (7)**	ESPN+	818	29–15	15–7
May 7	6:45 pm	Jacksonville	—	Liberty Baseball Stadium	**L** 3-11	Michael Darrell-Hicks (3–4)	**Dylan Cumming (4–3)**	—	ESPN+	729	29–16	15–8
May 8	1:00 pm	Jacksonville	—	Liberty Baseball Stadium	**W** 2–1	**Joe Adametz III (5–2)**	Christian Graham (2–3)	**Trey Carter (2)**	ESPN+	783	30–16	16–8
May 11	7:00 pm	at Virginia Tech	—	English Field Blacksburg, VA	**L** 1–2	Kiernan Higgins (3–0)	**Dylan Cumming (4–4)**	—	ACCNX	746	30–17	—
May 13	7:30 pm	at Florida Gulf Coast	—	Swanson Stadium Fort Myers, FL	**L** 7–8	Mason Miller (2–4)	**Mason Fluharty (3–3)**	—		208	30–18	16–9
May 14	2:00 pm	at Florida Gulf Coast	—	Swanson Stadium Fort Myers, FL	**W** 23–3	**Joe Adametz III (6–2)**	Tyler Shuck (5–5)	—	YouTube	246	31–18	17–9
May 15	12:00 pm	at Florida Gulf Coast	—	Swanson Stadium Fort Myers, FL	**W** 8–5	**Dylan Cumming (5–4)**	Nick Love (2–1)	**Mason Fluharty (2)**	YouTube	222	32–18	18–9
May 19	6:00 pm	Kennesaw State	—	Liberty Baseball Stadium	**L** 6–9	Smith Pinson (6–4)	**Trey Carter (2–1)**	—	ESPN+	1083	32–19	18–10
May 20	4:00 pm	Kennesaw State	—	Liberty Baseball Stadium	**L** 5–7	John Bezdicek (4–1)	**Joe Adametz III (6–3)**	Jared Rine (7)	ESPN+	1062	32–20	18–11
May 21	1:00 pm	Kennesaw State	—	Liberty Baseball Stadium	**W** 16–12	**Mason Fluharty (4–3)**	Miller Riggins (1–1)	**Tyler Germanowski (1)**	ESPN+	1010	33–20	19–11

Postseason (4–3)

ASUN Tournament (4–1)
Date	Time	Opponent	Seed	Site/stadium	Score	Win	Loss	Save	TV	Attendance	Overall record	ASUNT Record
May 24	11:00 am	at Florida Gulf Coast	—	Swanson Stadium Fort Myers, FL	**W** 4–3	**Mason Fluharty (5–3)**	Gus Carter (2–1)	—	ESPN+	374	34–20	1–0
May 25	11:00 am	Kennesaw State	—	Swanson Stadium Fort Myers, FL	**W** 12–6	**Max Alba (3–1)**	Kolby Johnson (1–1)	—	ESPN+	287	35–20	2–0
May 26	11:00 am	Lipscomb	—	Swanson Stadium Fort Myers, FL	**W** 10–2	**Tim Miller (1–1)**	Logan Van Treeck (0–2)	**Cole Garrett (1)**	ESPN+	107	36–20	3–0
May 27	11:00 am	Eastern Kentucky	—	Swanson Stadium Fort Myers, FL	**W** 18–9	**Mason Fluharty (6–3)**	Bryce Travis (2–2)	—	ESPN+	273	37–20	4–0
May 28	12:00 pm	Kennesaw State	—	Swanson Stadium Fort Myers, FL	**L** 6–10	John Bezdicek (5–1)	**Trey Gibson (5–3)**	—	ESPN+	124	37–21	4–1

NCAA tournament: Gainesville Regional (0–2)
Date	Time	Opponent	Seed	Site/stadium	Score	Win	Loss	Save	TV	Attendance	Overall record	NCAAT record
June 3	1:00 pm	at Oklahoma	—	Condron Ballpark Gainesville, FL	**L** 3–16	Jake Bennett (8–3)	**Dylan Cumming (5–5)**	—	ESPN+	2824	37–22	0–1
June 4	1:00 pm	at Central Michigan	—	Condron Ballpark Gainesville, FL	**L** 2–3	Adam Mrakitsch (7–1)	**Cade Hungate (2–1)**	—	ESPN+	2907	37–23	0–2

Schedule source:

== Rankings ==
Ranking movements Legend: ██ Increase in ranking ██ Decrease in ranking — = Not ranked RV = Received votes
	Week																		
Poll	Pre	1	2	3	4	5	6	7	8	9	10	11	12	13	14	15	16	17	Final
Coaches'	RV	RV*	19	16	14	17	RV	RV	RV	RV	RV	—							
Baseball America	—	18	17	12	12	13	22	—	—	—	—	—							
Collegiate Baseball^	—	24	22	16	17	18	28	—	—	—	—	—							
NCBWA†	RV	24	22	16	17	18	28	—	—	—	—	—							
D1Baseball	—	21	20	14	14	15	—	—	—	—	—	—							

^ Collegiate Baseball ranked 40 teams in their preseason poll, but only ranked 30 teams weekly during the season.
† NCBWA ranks 30 teams in their preseason poll, but only ranks 25 teams weekly during the season.
* A new poll was not released for this week, so for comparison purposes, the previous week's ranking is inserted in this week's slot.
