= Keehn =

Keehn is a surname. Notable people with the surname include:

- Kevin Keehn, American air force reserve brigadier general and commercial airline pilot
- Mike Keehn (born 1961), American college baseball coach and player

== See also ==
- Keen (surname)
