= 2021 Liberty Flames baseball team =

Baseball team season

2021 Liberty Flames baseball

Atlantic Sun regular season champion

NCAA tournament, Knoxville Regional
- Conference: Atlantic Sun Conference
- Division 1
- Record: 41–16 (19–2 ASUN)
- Head coach: Scott Jackson (5th season)
- Home stadium: Liberty Baseball Stadium

2021 ASUN Conference baseball standings
	Conf.				Overall
Team	W		L	PCT	W		L	PCT
North
Liberty ^{x}‍‍‍^{y}	19	–	2	.905	41	–	16	.719
Kennesaw State ‍‍‍	13	–	8	.619	29	–	22	.569
Lipscomb ‍‍‍	8	–	13	.381	18	–	29	.383
Bellarmine ‍‍‍	8	–	16	.333	13	–	36	.265
North Alabama ‍‍‍	6	–	15	.286	7	–	40	.149
South
Florida Gulf Coast ^{x}‍‍‍	12	–	6	.667	28	–	20	.583
North Florida ‍‍‍	11	–	7	.611	22	–	23	.489
Stetson ‍‍‍	10	–	8	.556	26	–	23	.531
Jacksonville ‍‍‡‍^{y}	3	–	15	.167	16	–	34	.320
x – Division champion ‡ – Tournament champion y – Invited to the NCAA tournament As of June 7, 2021; Rankings from D1Baseball

The 2021 Liberty Flames baseball team represented Liberty University during the 2021 NCAA Division I baseball season. The Flames played their home games at Liberty Baseball Stadium as members of the Atlantic Sun Conference They were led by fifth-year head coach Scott Jackson.

== Previous season ==
The 2020 Liberty Flames baseball team notched a 10–7 (0–0) regular-season record. The season prematurely ended on March 12, 2020, due to concerns over the COVID-19 pandemic.

== Game log ==
2021 Liberty Flames baseball game log (41–16)
Regular season (35–12)

February (2–5)
Date	Time	Opponent	Rank	Site/stadium	Score	Win	Loss	Save	Attendance	Overall record	ASUN Record
February 19	5:00 p.m.	at Campbell*		Jim Perry Stadium; Buies Creek, North Carolina	**W** 4–1	**Erickson (1–0)**	Cowan (0–1)	**Ellard (1)**	70	1–0	—
February 20	3:00 p.m.	at Campbell*		Jim Perry Stadium	**L** 3–17	Chasse (1–0)	**Gibson (0–1)**	—	70	1–1	—
February 21	1:00 p.m.	at Campbell*		Jim Perry Stadium	**L** 2–3	Kuehler (1–0)	**Fluharty (0–1)**	Westlake (1)	70	1–2	—
February 24	4:00 p.m.	North Carolina A&T*		Liberty Baseball Stadium; Lynchburg, Virginia	**W** 16–2	**Hand (1–0)**	Winebarger (0–1)	—	250	2–2	—
February 26	7:30 p.m.	at No. 10 TCU*		Lupton Stadium; Fort Worth, Texas	**L** 1–4	Green (1–0)	**Delaite (0–1)**	—	2,206	2–3	—
February 27	1:00 p.m.	at No. 10 TCU*		Lupton Stadium	**L** 2–9	King (1–1)	**Meyer (0–1)**	—	2,101	2–4	—
February 27	4:30 p.m.	at No. 10 TCU*		Lupton Stadium	**L** 2–12	Krob (1–0)	**Gibson (0–2)**	—	2,101	2–5	—

March (14–2)
Date	Time	Opponent	Rank	Site/stadium	Score	Win	Loss	Save	Attendance	Overall record	ASUN Record
March 2	4:00 p.m.	Radford*		Liberty Baseball Stadium	**W** 5–1	**Erickson (2–0)**	Bywaters (0–1)	—	250	3–5	—
March 5	2:00 p.m.	at UCF*		John Euliano Park; Orlando, Florida	**W** 2–1	**Delaite (1–1)**	Gordon (1–1)	**Riley (1)**	753	4–5	—
March 5	5:00 p.m.	at UCF*		John Euliano Park	**W** 8–3	**Meyer (1–1)**	Sinclair (0–1)	**Erickson (1)**	753	5–5	—
March 7	11:00 a.m.	at UCF*		John Euliano Park	**W** 3–2	**Gibson (1–2)**	Jones (1–1)	**Riley (2)**	736	6–5	—
March 9	3:00 p.m.	at No. 18 North Carolina*		Boshamer Stadium; Chapel Hill, North Carolina	**W** 8–7	**Erickson (3–0)**	Pry (0–2)	**Riley (3)**	800	7–5	—
March 12	4:00 p.m.	North Alabama		Liberty Baseball Stadium	**W** 4–0	**Delaite (2–1)**	Davidson (0–1)	—	448	8–5	1–0
March 13	2:00 p.m.	North Alabama		Liberty Baseball Stadium	**W** 7–0	**Meyer (2–1)**	Best (0–3)	—	600	9–5	2–0
March 14	1:00 p.m.	North Alabama		Liberty Baseball Stadium	**W** 6–0	**Gibson (2–2)**	Moore (0–3)	—	475	10–5	3–0
March 16	4:00 p.m.	No. 14 North Carolina*		Liberty Baseball Stadium	**W** 8–4	**Erickson (4–0)**	Quick (0–1)	**Riley (4)**	550	11–5	—
March 20	2:00 p.m.	VCU*		Liberty Baseball Stadium	**W** 3–2	**Riley (1–0)**	Watson (1–3)	—	528	12–5	—
March 21	2:00 p.m.	at VCU*		The Diamond; Richmond, Virginia	**W** 6–1	**Gibson (3–2)**	Dailey (0–1)	—	282	13–5	—
March 24	2:00 p.m.	Virginia*		Liberty Baseball Stadium	**W** 10–2	**Erickson (5–0)**	Wyatt (1–1)	—	597	14–5	—
March 26	2:00 p.m.	at Bellarmine		Knights Field; Louisville, Kentucky	**W** 5–2	**Delaite (3–1)**	Miley (3–3)	**Ellard (2)**	50	15–5	4–0
March 27	12:00 p.m.	at Bellarmine		Knights Field	**L** 7–8	Barringer (2–3)	**Erickson (5–1)**	Ethington (2)	80	15–6	4–1
March 27	3:30 p.m.	at Bellarmine		Knights Field	**W** 5–1	**Gibson (4–2)**	Nagel (0–1)	—	80	16–6	5–1
March 30	4:00 p.m.	at Duke*		Durham Bulls Athletic Park; Durham, North Carolina	**L** 4–5	Allen (2–1)	**Hand (1–1)**	Loper (4)	0	16–7	—

April (12–4)
Date	Time	Opponent	Rank	Site/stadium	Score	Win	Loss	Save	Attendance	Overall record	ASUN Record
April 2	2:00 p.m.	VCU*		Liberty Baseball Stadium	**W** 9–3	**Erickson (6–1)**	Ellis (3–1)	—	189	17–7	—
April 3	2:00 p.m.	at VCU*		The Diamond	**L** 2–4	Davis (5–1)	**Gibson (4–3)**	Chenier (2)	197	17–8	—
April 7	4:00 p.m.	Wake Forest*		Liberty Baseball Stadium	**W** 8–4	**Meyer (3–1)**	McNamee (3–1)	—	546	18–8	—
April 9	6:00 p.m.	Lipscomb		Liberty Baseball Stadium	**W** 4–1	**Delaite (4–1)**	Habegger (1–5)	**Meyer (1)**	528	19–8	6–1
April 10	2:00 p.m.	Lipscomb		Liberty Baseball Stadium	**W** 18–1	**Willard (1–0)**	Van Treeck (2–1)	—	492	20–8	7–1
April 11	1:00 p.m.	Lipscomb		Liberty Baseball Stadium	**W** 5–4	**Gibson (5–3)**	Bierman (1–3)	—	517	21–8	8–1
April 13	6:00 p.m.	No. 12 Virginia Tech*		Liberty Baseball Stadium	**W** 8–2	**Cumming (1–0)**	Okuda (2–2)	**Ellard (3)**	591	22–8	—
April 16	6:00 p.m.	at North Alabama		Mike D. Lane Field; Florence, Alabama	**W** 13–5	**Delaite (5–1)**	Davidson (1–5)	—	103	23–8	9–1
April 17	3:00 p.m.	at North Alabama		Mike D. Lane Field	**W** 15–1	**Willard (2–0)**	Best (1–7)	—	112	24–8	10–1
April 18	1:30 p.m.	at North Alabama		Mike D. Lane Field	**W** 15–0	**Gibson (6–3)**	Moore (0–6)	—	95	25–8	11–1
April 20	6:00 p.m.	Duke*		Liberty Baseball Stadium	**L** 0–7	Nifong (2–3)	**Cumming (1–1)**	—	548	25–9	—
April 23	6:00 p.m.	Coastal Carolina*		Liberty Baseball Stadium	**W** 7–2	**Delaite (6–1)**	Abney (1–1)	—	619	26–9	—
April 24	11:00 a.m.	Coastal Carolina*		Liberty Baseball Stadium	**L** 0–2	Parker (3–3)	**Willard (2–1)**	Kruezer (2)	475	26–10	—
April 25	2:00 p.m.	Coastal Carolina*		Liberty Baseball Stadium	**W** 6–4	**Erickson (7–1)**	Barrow (0–2)	**Riley (5)**	562	27–10	—
April 27	3:00 p.m.	at Virginia*		Davenport Field; Charlottesville, Virginia	**L** 5–6	Schoch (2–0)	**Hungate (0–1)**	—	323	27–11	—
April 30	6:00 p.m.	Bellarmine		Liberty Baseball Stadium	**W** 15–3	**Delaite (7–1)**	Miley (3–5)	—	601	28–11	12–1

May (7–1)
Date	Time	Opponent	Rank	Site/stadium	Score	Win	Loss	Save	Attendance	Overall record	ASUN Record
May 1	4:00 p.m.	Bellarmine		Liberty Baseball Stadium	**W** 8–7	**Erickson (8–1)**	Ethington (2–3)	**Ellard (4)**	553	29–11	13–1
May 2	1:00 p.m.	Bellarmine		Liberty Baseball Stadium	**W** 9–8	**Riley (2–0)**	Davis (0–4)	—	460	30–11	14–1
May 7	6:00 p.m.	Kennesaw State		Liberty Baseball Stadium	**W** 4–0	**Delaite (8–1)**	Rice (8–1)	—	545	31–11	15–1
May 8	4:00 p.m.	Kennesaw State		Liberty Baseball Stadium	**W** 6–5	**Cumming (2–1)**	Torbert (5–4)	**Ellard (5)**	541	32–11	16–1
May 9	1:00 p.m.	Kennesaw State		Liberty Baseball Stadium	**W** 4–1	**Gibson (7–3)**	Kennedy (6–1)	—	477	33–11	17–1
May 14	5:00 p.m.	at Kennesaw State		Fred Stillwell Stadium; Kennesaw, Georgia	**W** 3–1	**Delaite (9–1)**	Rice (8–2)	—	120	34–11	18–1
May 15	2:00 p.m.	at Kennesaw State		Fred Stillwell Stadium	**W** 12–11	**Cumming (3–1)**	Torbert (5–5)	**Ellard (6)**	120	35–11	19–1
May 16	1:00 p.m.	at Kennesaw State		Fred Stillwell Stadium	**L** 4–7	Kennedy (7–1)	**Gibson (7–4)**	—	120	35–12	19–2

Post-season (6–4)

ASUN Tournament (4–2)
Date	Time	Opponent	Seed	Site/stadium	Score	Win	Loss	Save	Attendance	Overall record	ASUNT Record
May 21	6:00 p.m.	(4N) Bellarmine; Quarterfinal Series – Game 1	(1N)	Liberty Baseball Stadium	**W** 5–2	**Delaite (10–1)**	Nagel (2–5)	**Ellard (7)**	476	36–12	1–0
May 22	4:00 p.m.	(4N) Bellarmine; Quarterfinal Series – Game 2	(1N)	Liberty Baseball Stadium	**W** 12–6	**Cumming (4–1)**	Ethington (2–6)	—	483	37–12	2–0
May 27	11:00 a.m.	vs. (4S) Jacksonville; Second Round	(1N)	Harmon Stadium; Jacksonville, Florida	**L** 1–2	Santana (5–7)	**Cumming (4–2)**	McCoy (5)	347	37–13	2–1
May 28	11:00 a.m.	vs. (2N) Kennesaw State; Losers Semifinal	(1N)	Harmon Stadium	**W** 6–0	**Delaite (11–1)**	Kennedy (8–2)	—	213	38–13	3–1
May 28	7:20 p.m.	at (2S) North Florida; Losers Final	(1N)	Harmon Stadium	**W** 5–2	**Meyer (4–1)**	McKinley (4–6)	**Fluharty (1)**	331	39–13	4–1
May 29	1:00 p.m.	vs. (4S) Jacksonville; Finals – Game 1	(1N)	Harmon Stadium	**L** 3–7	Adams (2–4)	**Hand (1–2)**	—	423	39–14	4–2

NCAA Knoxville Regional (2–2)
Date	Time	Opponent	Seed	Site/stadium	Score	Win	Loss	Save	Attendance	Overall record	NCAAT record
June 4	12:00 p.m.	vs. (2) No. 19 Duke; Regional First round	(3)	Lindsey Nelson Stadium; Knoxville, Tennessee	**W** 11–6	**Delaite (12–1)**	Carey (4–3)	—	3,951	40–14	1–0
June 5	6:00 p.m.	at (1) No. 2 Tennessee; Regional semifinal	(3)	Lindsey Nelson Stadium	**L** 3–9	Tidwell (9–3)	**Cumming (4–3)**	Sewell (2)	4,006	40–15	1–1
June 6	2:45 p.m.	vs. (2) No. 19 Duke; Losers Regional final	(3)	Lindsey Nelson Stadium	**W** 15–4	**Meyer (5–1)**	Stinson (3–4)	—	3,941	41–15	2–1
June 6	6:45 p.m.	at (1) No. 2 Tennessee; Regional final – Game 1	(3)	Lindsey Nelson Stadium	**L** 1–3	Heflin (3–3)	**Ellard (0–1)**	Hunley (8)	3,941	41–16	2–2

Legend: = Win = Loss = Cancelled
Bold = Liberty team member

Schedule source:

== Rankings ==
Ranking movements Legend: ██ Increase in ranking ██ Decrease in ranking — = Not ranked RV = Received votes
	Week																		
Poll	Pre	1	2	3	4	5	6	7	8	9	10	11	12	13	14	15	16	17	Final
Coaches'	—	—*	—	—	—	—	—	—	—	—	—	RV	RV	RV	RV	RV	RV	RV	—
Baseball America	—	—	—	—	—	—	—	—	—	—	—	—	—	—	—	—	—	—	—
Collegiate Baseball^	RV	—	—	—	—	—	—	—	—	—	RV	RV	RV	RV	RV	RV	RV	RV	—
NCBWA†	—	—	—	—	—	—	—	—	—	RV	RV	RV	RV	RV	RV	RV	RV	RV	—
D1Baseball	—	—	—	—	—	—	—	—	—	—	—	—	—	—	—	RV	—	—	—

^ Collegiate Baseball ranked 40 teams in their preseason poll, but only ranked 30 teams weekly during the season.
† NCBWA ranks 30 teams in their preseason poll, but only ranks 25 teams weekly during the season.
* A new poll was not released for this week, so for comparison purposes, the previous week's ranking is inserted in this week's slot.

== Awards and honors ==
ASUN Season Awards
Player	Award	Date Awarded	Ref.
Trevor Delaite	ASUN Pitcher of the Year	May 20, 2021	
Cam Locklear	ASUN Defensive Player of the Year	May 20, 2021	
Trey Gibson	ASUN Freshman of the Year	May 20, 2021	
Scott Jackson	ASUN Freshman of the Year	May 20, 2021	

All-ASUN
Player	Position	Team
Trevor Delaite	SP	1
Fraser Ellard	RP	1
Gray Betts	C	1
Will Wagner	2B	1
Trey Gibson	SP	2
Trey McDyre	3B	2
Cam Locklear	SS	2
Brady Gulakowski	DH	2
