= 2022 ASUN Conference baseball tournament =

American college baseball tournament

- Teams: 8
- Format: see below
- Finals site: Swanson Stadium; Fort Myers, Florida
- Champions: Kennesaw State (2nd title)
- Winning coach: Ryan Coe (1st title)
- Television: ESPN+

2022 ASUN Conference baseball standings
	Conf.				Overall
Team	W		L	PCT	W		L	PCT
East
Kennesaw State ^{x}‍‍‡‍^{y}	19	–	11	.633	35	–	26	.574
Liberty ^{x}‍‍‍^{y}	19	–	11	.633	37	–	21	.638
Florida Gulf Coast ‍‍‍	17	–	13	.567	35	–	23	.603
Jacksonville ‍‍‍	13	–	16	.448	27	–	28	.491
North Florida ‍‍‍	11	–	18	.379	22	–	33	.400
Stetson ‍‍‍	10	–	20	.333	26	–	29	.473
West
Eastern Kentucky ^{x}‍‍‍	20	–	10	.667	38	–	20	.655
Lipscomb ^{x}‍‍‍	20	–	10	.667	35	–	23	.603
Jacksonville State ‍‍‍	19	–	11	.633	27	–	28	.491
Central Arkansas ‍‍‍	18	–	12	.600	24	–	29	.453
Bellarmine ‍‍‍	8	–	22	.267	11	–	43	.204
North Alabama ‍‍‍	5	–	25	.167	12	–	41	.226
x – Division champion ‡ – Tournament champion y – Invited to the NCAA tournament Rankings from D1Baseball

The 2022 ASUN Conference baseball tournament was held at Swanson Stadium, home field of the Florida Gulf Coast Eagles baseball team in Fort Myers, Florida, from May 24 through 28. The winner of the tournament claimed the ASUN Conference's automatic bid to the 2022 NCAA Division I baseball tournament.

== Format and seeding ==
The two division winners plus the next two top teams by the RPI will be placed in Pool A, while the next four teams by RPI will be placed in Pool B. Each pool will play a round-robin schedule, with the top three teams from Pool A and the Pool B winner advancing to the single-elimination semifinals, with the semifinal winners meeting for the championship. The Pool A winner will play the Pool B winner in one semifinal and the Pool A runner-up will play the Pool A third place in the other semifinal.

== Bracket and results ==
Pool A

		LIB	LIP	KSU	FGCU
1	Liberty		W 10–2	W 12–6	W 4–3
2	Lipscomb	L 2–10		W 12–10	L 3–6
3	Kennesaw State	L 6–12	L 10–12		W 7-6
4	Florida Gulf Coast	L 3–4	W 6–3	L 6–7	

Pool B

		JU	EKU	UNF	JSU
1	Jacksonville		L 2–5	L 3–9	L 4–8
2	Eastern Kentucky	W 5–2		W 5–3	W 7–4
3	North Florida	W 9–3	L 3–5		
4	Jacksonville State	W 8–4	L 4–7		

Semifinals and final

Semifinals
1	Liberty	18
6	Eastern Kentucky	9
2	Lipscomb	4
3	Kennesaw State	6

Finals
1	Liberty	6
3	Kennesaw State	10
