= 2026 ASUN Conference baseball tournament =

American college baseball tournament

- Teams: 8
- Format: Double-elimination
- Finals site: Melching Field at Conrad Park; DeLand, Florida
- Champions: Lipscomb (4th title)
- Winning coach: Jeff Forehand (4th title)
- MVP: Cam Pruitt (Lipscomb)

2026 ASUN Conference baseball standings
	Conf.				Overall
Team	W		L	PCT	W		L	PCT
Gold
Lipscomb ^{x}‍‍‡‍^{y}	19	–	11	.633	26	–	24	.520
North Alabama ^{x}‍‍‍	19	–	11	.633	28	–	26	.519
Central Arkansas ‍‍‍	17	–	13	.567	30	–	25	.545
Austin Peay ‍‍‍	14	–	16	.467	24	–	31	.436
Bellarmine ‍‍‍	11	–	18	.379	19	–	33	.365
Eastern Kentucky ‍‍‍	9	–	20	.310	16	–	37	.302
Graphite
North Florida ^{x}‍‍‍	22	–	8	.733	31	–	22	.585
Florida Gulf Coast ‍‍‍	17	–	12	.586	34	–	20	.630
Jacksonville ‍‍‍	16	–	14	.533	30	–	24	.556
Stetson ‍‍‍	13	–	16	.448	23	–	31	.426
Queens ‍‍‍	11	–	19	.367	16	–	38	.296
West Georgia* ‍‍‍	10	–	20	.333	13	–	41	.241
* Ineligible for the 2026 NCAA tournament due to transition from Division II
x – Division champion ‡ – Tournament champion y – Invited to the NCAA tournament As of May 17, 2026; Rankings from D1Baseball

The 2026 ASUN Conference baseball tournament was held at Melching Field at Conrad Park on the campus of Stetson University in DeLand, Florida from May 19 through 23. to determine the champion of the ASUN Conference for the 2026 season. The winner of the tournament claimed the conference's automatic bid to the 2026 NCAA Division I baseball tournament. The Lipscomb Bisons won their fourth conference championship title in a 5–4 walk-off win in the 10th inning against the North Alabama Lions on May 23, 2026. Lipscomb's Cam Pruitt received the tournament's most valuable player award.

== Format and seeding ==
The 2026 tournament was a double-elimination tournament in which the top four finishers from each six-team division qualified for the tournament. Teams were seeded based on conference winning percentage, followed by division winning percentage, with the first tiebreaker being head-to-head record. The two division winners received double byes, while the 5-8 seeds played a single elimination round, followed by another single elimination round with seeds 3 and 4. The tournament then shifted to double-elimination format.

== Bracket ==
Upper round 1
6	Central Arkansas	6
8	Stetson	4
5	Jacksonville	7
7	Austin Peay	1

Upper round 2
3	Florida Gulf Coast	4
6	Central Arkansas	3
4	North Alabama	5
5	Jacksonville	0

Upper final
1	North Florida	4
4	North Alabama	11
2	Lipscomb	4
3	Florida Gulf Coast	1
Lower round 3
1	North Florida	1
3	Florida Gulf Coast	3

Semifinals
4	North Alabama	3
2	Lipscomb	4^{(14)}
Lower final
3	Florida Gulf Coast	5
4	North Alabama	6

Final
2	Lipscomb	5^{(10)}	–
4	North Alabama	4	–

== Schedule ==
Game	Time*	Matchup^{#}	Score	Notes	Reference
Tuesday, May 19
1	2:00 pm	No. 7 Austin Peay vs No. 5 Jacksonville	1–7	Austin Peay Eliminated	
2	6:00 pm	No. 8 Stetson vs No. 6 Central Arkansas	4–6	Stetson Eliminated	
Wednesday, May 20
3	2:00 pm	No. 5 Jacksonville vs No. 4 North Alabama	0–5	Jacksonville Eliminated	
Thursday, May 21
4	9:00 am	No. 6 Central Arkansas vs No. 3 Florida Gulf Coast	3–4	Central Arkansas Eliminated	
5	1:00 pm	No. 4 North Alabama vs No. 1 North Florida	11–4		
6	4:00 pm	No. 3 Florida Gulf Coast vs No. 2 Lipscomb	1–4		
Friday, May 22
7	10:00 am	No. 1 North Florida vs. No. 3 Florida Gulf Coast	1–3	North Florida Eliminated	
8	2:00 pm	No. 2 Lipscomb vs No. 4 North Alabama			
9	6:00 pm	No. 3 Florida Gulf Coast vs Game 8 Loser		Elimination Game	
Saturday, May 23
10	2:00 pm	Game 8 Winner vs Game 9 Winner			
11	TBD (if necessary)	Game 10 Winner vs Game 10 Loser		Elimination Game (if necessary)	
