= 2021 Jacksonville Dolphins baseball team =

Baseball team

2021 Jacksonville Dolphins baseball

Atlantic Sun tournament champion

NCAA tournament, Columbia Regional
- Conference: Atlantic Sun Conference
- Record: 16–32 (3–15 ASUN)
- Head coach: Chris Hayes (5th season)
- Home stadium: John Sessions Stadium

2021 ASUN Conference baseball standings
	Conf.				Overall
Team	W		L	PCT	W		L	PCT
North
Liberty ^{x}‍‍‍^{y}	19	–	2	.905	41	–	16	.719
Kennesaw State ‍‍‍	13	–	8	.619	29	–	22	.569
Lipscomb ‍‍‍	8	–	13	.381	18	–	29	.383
Bellarmine ‍‍‍	8	–	16	.333	13	–	36	.265
North Alabama ‍‍‍	6	–	15	.286	7	–	40	.149
South
Florida Gulf Coast ^{x}‍‍‍	12	–	6	.667	28	–	20	.583
North Florida ‍‍‍	11	–	7	.611	22	–	23	.489
Stetson ‍‍‍	10	–	8	.556	26	–	23	.531
Jacksonville ‍‍‡‍^{y}	3	–	15	.167	16	–	34	.320
x – Division champion ‡ – Tournament champion y – Invited to the NCAA tournament As of June 7, 2021; Rankings from D1Baseball

The 2021 Jacksonville Dolphins baseball team represented Jacksonville University during the 2021 NCAA Division I baseball season. The Dolphins played their home games at John Sessions Stadium as a member of the Atlantic Sun Conference They were led by head coach Chris Hayes, in his fifth year as head coach.

== Previous season ==
The 2020 Jacksonville Dolphins baseball team notched a 9–9 (0–0) regular-season record. The season prematurely ended on March 12, 2020, due to concerns over the COVID-19 pandemic.

=== Columbia Regional ===
Columbia Regional Teams
(1) Old Dominion Monarchs	(2) South Carolina Gamecocks	(3) Virginia Cavaliers	(4) Jacksonville Dolphins

First Round
1	Old Dominion	4
4	Jacksonville	3
3	Virginia	3
2	South Carolina	4
Lower round 1
4	Jacksonville	8
3	Virginia	13

Semi-Finals
1	Old Dominion	2
2	South Carolina	1
Lower final
2	South Carolina	2
3	Virginia	3

Finals
1	Old Dominion
3	Virginia
