= 2026 North Alabama Lions baseball team =

Intercollegiate baseball season

2026 North Alabama Lions baseball

ASUN Gold Division co-champions
- Conference: Atlantic Sun Conference
- Record: 28–26 (19–11 ASUN)
- Head coach: Jad Prachniak (4th season)
- Assistant coaches: Nick Patton (4th season); Jacob James (1st season)
- Home stadium: Mike D. Lane Field at Bank Independent Stadium

2026 ASUN Conference baseball standings
| | Conf. | | | | Overall |
| Team | W | | L | PCT | W | | L | PCT |
|---|---|---|---|---|---|---|---|---|
Gold
| Lipscomb ^{x}‍‍‡‍^{y} | 19 | – | 11 | .633 | 26 | – | 24 | .520 |
| North Alabama ^{x}‍‍‍ | 19 | – | 11 | .633 | 28 | – | 26 | .519 |
| Central Arkansas ‍‍‍ | 17 | – | 13 | .567 | 30 | – | 25 | .545 |
| Austin Peay ‍‍‍ | 14 | – | 16 | .467 | 24 | – | 31 | .436 |
| Bellarmine ‍‍‍ | 11 | – | 18 | .379 | 19 | – | 33 | .365 |
| Eastern Kentucky ‍‍‍ | 9 | – | 20 | .310 | 16 | – | 37 | .302 |
Graphite
| North Florida ^{x}‍‍‍ | 22 | – | 8 | .733 | 31 | – | 22 | .585 |
| Florida Gulf Coast ‍‍‍ | 17 | – | 12 | .586 | 34 | – | 20 | .630 |
| Jacksonville ‍‍‍ | 16 | – | 14 | .533 | 30 | – | 24 | .556 |
| Stetson ‍‍‍ | 13 | – | 16 | .448 | 23 | – | 31 | .426 |
| Queens ‍‍‍ | 11 | – | 19 | .367 | 16 | – | 38 | .296 |
| West Georgia* ‍‍‍ | 10 | – | 20 | .333 | 13 | – | 41 | .241 |
* Ineligible for the 2026 NCAA tournament due to transition from Division II
x – Division champion ‡ – Tournament champion y – Invited to the NCAA tournament As of May 17, 2026; Rankings from D1Baseball

The 2026 North Alabama Lions baseball team represent the University of North Alabama during the 2026 NCAA Division I baseball season. They are led by head coach Jad Prachniak, in his 4th season at UNA. The Lions played their home games at Mike D. Lane Field at Bank Independent Stadium as a members of the Atlantic Sun Conference.

This is the Lions' first full season playing at Mike D. Lane Field at Bank Independent Stadium. The Lions played 21 games at the stadium in 2025 as the stadium was still under construction.

== Previous season ==
The 2023 team finished the season with a 24–31 record and a 16–13 record in ASUN play. They finished 3rd in the Gold Division and advanced to the ASUN Tournament.

The ASUN Tournament marked the UNA baseball program's first postseason appearance at the Division I level. The tournament saw them lose to Jacksonville 1-5 before beating North Florida 14-11. North Alabama was eliminated from the tournament after a second loss to Jacksonville.

== Preseason ==
=== Coaches poll ===
The ASUN baseball coaches' poll was released on February 8, 2024.

ASUN Gold Division Preseason Coaches' Poll
| Predicted finish | Team | Points |
|---|---|---|
| 1 | Austin Peay | 34 (4) |
| 2 | Lipscomb | 28 |
| 3 | North Alabama | 23 (1) |
| 4 | Central Arkansas | 18 (1) |
| 5 | Eastern Kentucky | 15 |
| 6 | Bellarmine | 8 |

== Personnel ==
2026 North Alabama Lions roster
| Pitchers: 8 – Tripp Patterson – Sophomore; 11 – Jordan Touhey – (redshirt) Freshman; 15 – Landon Scruggs – Senior; 16 – Reese Young – Sophomore; 18 – Hunter Bell – Senior; 19 – Kelly Crumpton – Senior; 21 – Justus Agosto – (redshirt) Senior; 22 – Kevin Henrich – (redshirt) Junior; 27 – Luke Davenport – Sophomore; 28 – Nico Varlotta – Freshman; 29 – Justin Battle – Senior; 30 – John Allen Stogner – Graduate; 31 – Tyler Rice – Graduate; 32 – Carlos Carmona – Senior; 33 – Josh Bowerman – (redshirt) Junior; 43 – Sawyer Toney – Senior; 48 – Gavin Oswald – Graduate; 51 – Jake Boynar – Junior | Catchers: 2 – Will Millard – Junior; 10 – Charlie Cochran – (redshirt) Junior; 26 – John Austin Wood – Freshman; 44 – Wes Walker – Sophomore; Infielders: 3 – Leighton Jenkins – Graduate; 4 – Bryant Loving – Junior; 5 – Dylan Coleman – Senior; 9 – Ryker Billingsley – Senior; 12 – Jackson Westmoreland – Junior; 14 – Gio Lonero – (redshirt) Freshman; 17 – Justin Santoyo – Graduate; 37 – Ryan West – Senior; 39 – Tyler LePage – Junior; 40 – Petey Craska – (redshirt) Sophomore; 45 – Ethan Moore – Junior | Outfielders: 7 – Cayden Sheffield – (redshirt) Freshman; 13 – Chandler Ketchup – Junior; 20 – Jackson Cheek – (redshirt) Junior; 22 – Tait Nunnally – Junior; 25 – Alex Wade – (redshirt) Junior; 34 – Nash Rippen – Senior |

=== Coaching staff ===
| Name | Position | Seasons at North Alabama | Alma mater |
|---|---|---|---|
| Jad Prachniak | Head coach | 4 | University of Rhode Island (2005) |
| Nick Patten | Assistant Baseball Coach / Hitting Coach / Recruiting Coordinator | 4 | University of Delaware (2021) |
| J.D. Davis | Assistant Coach / Recruiting Coordinator | 1 | The Citadel (2020) |
| Jacob James | Director of Pitching Development | 1 | University of North Alabama (2025) |

== Schedule and results ==
Legend
| | North Alabama win |
| | North Alabama loss |
| | Postponement/Cancellation/Suspensions |
| **Bold** | North Alabama team member |

2026 North Alabama Lions baseball game log (24–23)
Regular season (24–23)

February (6–5)
| Date | Opponent | Rank | Site/stadium | Score | Win | Loss | Save | TV | Attendance | Overall record | ASUN record |
|---|---|---|---|---|---|---|---|---|---|---|---|
| February 13 | SIUE | | Mike D. Lane Field at Bank Independent Stadium; Florence, AL | **W** 3–1 | **Oswald** (1–0) | Phillips (0–1) | None | ESPN+ | 1,000 | 1–0 | — |
| February 13 | SIUE | | Mike D. Lane Field at Bank Independent Stadium; Florence, AL | **W** 8–1 | **Davenport** (1–0) | Stearns (0–1) | None | ESPN+ | 750 | 2–0 | — |
| February 14 | SIUE | | Mike D. Lane Field at Bank Independent Stadium; Florence, AL | **L** 1–2 | Martin (1–0) | **Touhey** (0–1) | Harris (1) | ESPN+ | 1,350 | 2–1 | — |
| February 17 | UAB | | Mike D. Lane Field at Bank Independent Stadium; Florence, AL | **L** 3–15 | Samuelson (1–0) | **Varlotta** (0–1) | None | ESPN+ | 550 | 2–2 | — |
| February 18 | Murray State | | Mike D. Lane Field at Bank Independent Stadium; Florence, AL | **W** 15–5^{(7)} | **Touhey** (1–1) | Patterson (0–1) | None | | 542 | 3–2 | — |
| February 20 | Saint Louis | | Mike D. Lane Field at Bank Independent Stadium; Florence, AL | **W** 7–4 | **Oswald** (2–0) | Welk (0–1) | None | ESPN+ | 625 | 4–2 | — |
| February 21 | Saint Louis | | Mike D. Lane Field at Bank Independent Stadium; Florence, AL | **W** 12–2^{(7)} | **Davenport** (2–0) | Andrunas (0–1) | None | | 701 | 5–2 | — |
| February 22 | Saint Louis | | Mike D. Lane Field at Bank Independent Stadium; Florence, AL | **W** 8–6 | **Touhey** (2–1) | McKinney (0–2) | **Scruggs** (1) | ESPN+ | 367 | 6–2 | — |
| February 24 | Samford | | Joe Lee Griffin Field; Birmingham, AL | **L** 5–6 | Spurrier (1–0) | **Oswald** (2–1) | None | ESPN+ | 301 | 6–3 | — |
| February 27 | Southern Indiana | | Mike D. Lane Field at Bank Independent Stadium; Florence, AL | **L** 1–20^{(7)} | Figueroa (2–1) | **Patterson** (0–1) | None | | 437 | 6–4 | — |
| February 28 | Southern Indiana | | Mike D. Lane Field at Bank Independent Stadium; Florence, AL | **L** 0–8 | Weller (1–0) | **Davenport** (2–1) | None | | 818 | 6–5 | — |

March (6–11)
| Date | Opponent | Rank | Site/stadium | Score | Win | Loss | Save | TV | Attendance | Overall record | ASUN record |
|---|---|---|---|---|---|---|---|---|---|---|---|
| March 1 | Southern Indiana | | Mike D. Lane Field at Bank Independent Stadium; Florence, AL | **W** 7–3 | **Stogner** (1–0) | Skwarek (1–1) | None | | 893 | 7–5 | — |
| March 4 | #17 Ole Miss | | Swayze Field; Oxford, MS | **L** 5–8 | Robertson (2–0) | **Agosto** (0–1) | Koenig (2) | SECN+ | 8,471 | 7–6 | — |
| March 6 | #10 Southern Miss | | Pete Taylor Park; Hattiesburg, MS | **L** 4–9 | Allen (1–1) | **Patterson** (0–2) | Sivley (1) | ESPN+ | 5,364 | 7–7 | — |
| March 7 | #10 Southern Miss | | Pete Taylor Park; Hattiesburg, MS | **L** 1–6 | Harris (3–0) | **Davenport** (2–2) | Och (2) | ESPN+ | 5,263 | 7–8 | — |
| March 8 | #10 Southern Miss | | Pete Taylor Park; Hattiesburg, MS | **L** 2–9 | English (1–0) | **Stogner** (1–1) | None | ESPN+ | 5,152 | 7–9 | — |
| March 10 | Jacksonville State | | Mike D. Lane Field at Bank Independent Stadium; Florence, AL | **L** 3–8 | Thomas (1–0) | **Boynar** (0–1) | None | | 524 | 7–10 | — |
| March 13 | Lipscomb | | Dugan Field; Nashville, TN | **L** 3–6 | Bosley-Smith (1–1) | **Patterson** (0–3) | Kantola (2) | ESPN+ | 277 | 7–11 | 0–1 |
| March 14 | Lipscomb | | Dugan Field; Nashville, TN | **L** 5–7 | Jamison (1–0) | **Davenport** (2–3) | None | ESPN+ | 427 | 7–12 | 0–2 |
| March 15 | Lipscomb | | Dugan Field; Nashville, TN | **W** 13–7 | **Young** (1–0) | Jackson (1–2) | None | ESPN+ | 337 | 8–12 | 1–2 |
| March 17 | Tennessee Tech | | Mike D. Lane Field at Bank Independent Stadium; Florence, AL | **L** 9–10 | Kuntz (1–0) | **Boynar** (0–2) | Barnett (1) | ESPN+ | 212 | 8–13 | — |
| March 20 | Eastern Kentucky | | Mike D. Lane Field at Bank Independent Stadium; Florence, AL | **W** 7–5^{(10)} | **Oswald** (2–1) | Bell (0–1) | None | ESPN+ | 814 | 9–13 | 2–2 |
| March 21 | Eastern Kentucky | | Mike D. Lane Field at Bank Independent Stadium; Florence, AL | **W** 8–5 | **Patterson** (1–3) | Price (2–2) | **Agosto** (1) | ESPN+ | 603 | 10–13 | 3–2 |
| March 22 | Eastern Kentucky | | Mike D. Lane Field at Bank Independent Stadium; Florence, AL | **W** 7–5 | **Agosto** (1–1) | Howell (1–2) | **Rice** (1) | ESPN+ | 712 | 11–13 | 4–2 |
| March 27 | Bellarmine | | Knights Field; Louisville, KY | **L** 6–16^{(7)<} | Hart (1–1) | **Agosto** (1–2) | None | ESPN+ | 100 | 11–14 | 4–3 |
| March 28 | Bellarmine | | Knights Field; Louisville, KY | **W** 7–4 | **Patterson** (2–3) | Sims (0–2) | **Toney** (1) | | | 12–14 | 5–3 |
| March 29 | Bellarmine | | Knights Field; Louisville, KY | **L** 9–12 | Rusch (2–0) | **Agosto** (1–3) | None | ESPN+ | | 12–15 | 5–4 |
| March 31 | UAB | | Young Memorial Field; Birmingham, AL | **L** 0–10^{(7)} | Hicks (1–1) | **Bell** (0–1) | None | ESPN+ | 245 | 12–16 | — |

April (11–4)
| Date | Opponent | Rank | Site/stadium | Score | Win | Loss | Save | TV | Attendance | Overall record | ASUN record |
|---|---|---|---|---|---|---|---|---|---|---|---|
| April 2 | Central Arkansas | | Mike D. Lane Field at Bank Independent Stadium; Florence, AL | **W** 4–3 | **Battle** (1–0) | Fernandez (1–4) | **Oswald** (1) | ESPN+ | 919 | 13–16 | 6–4 |
| April 3 | Central Arkansas | | Mike D. Lane Field at Bank Independent Stadium; Florence, AL | **L** 2–4^{(11)} | Alexander (3–1) | **Davenport** (1–4) | None | | 573 | 13–17 | 6–5 |
| April 4 | Central Arkansas | | Mike D. Lane Field at Bank Independent Stadium; Florence, AL | **W** 16–9 | **Oswald** (3–1) | Williams (1–4) | None | | 923 | 14–17 | 7–5 |
| April 7 | UT Martin | | Mike D. Lane Field at Bank Independent Stadium; Florence, AL | **L** 5–6 | King (3–3) | **Boynar** (0–3) | Bryant (2) | ESPN+ | 314 | 14–18 | — |
| April 10 | Austin Peay | | Raymond C. Hand Park; Clarksville, TN | **W** 9–3 | **Oswald** (5–1) | Lanham (0–2) | None | ESPN+ | 428 | 15–18 | 8–5 |
| April 11 | Austin Peay | | Raymond C. Hand Park; Clarksville, TN | **W** 13–12 | **Patterson** (3–3) | McCain (1–2) | **Davenport** (1) | ESPN+ | 493 | 16–18 | 9–5 |
| April 12 | Austin Peay | | Raymond C. Hand Park; Clarksville, TN | **W** 15–5^{(8)} | **Young** (2–0) | Merriweather (2–1) | None | ESPN+ | 338 | 17–18 | 10–5 |
| April 14 | UT Martin | | Skyhawk Baseball Field; Martin, TN | **W** 21–3^{(7)} | **Stogner** (2–1) | Jones (0–1) | None | ESPN+ | 120 | 18–18 | — |
| April 17 | Lipscomb | | Mike D. Lane Field at Bank Independent Stadium; Florence, AL | **L** 4–6 | Llinas (2–3) | **Oswald** (5–2 | Kantola (5) | ESPN+ | 691 | 18–19 | 10–6 |
| April 18 | Lipscomb | | Mike D. Lane Field at Bank Independent Stadium; Florence, AL | **W** 6–2 | **Patterson** (4–3) | Martin Jr. (1–2) | **Davenport** (2) | | 455 | 19–19 | 11–6 |
| April 19 | Lipscomb | | Mike D. Lane Field at Bank Independent Stadium; Florence, AL | **L** 0–6 | Bosley-Smith (3–2) | **Stogner** (2–1) | Lee (1) | ESPN+ | 326 | 19–20 | 11–7 |
| April 22 | Tennessee Tech | | Bush Stadium; Cookeville, TN | **W** 10–7 | **Boynar** (1–3) | Barnett (0–3) | **Young** (1) | ESPN+ | 236 | 20–20 | — |
| April 24 | Eastern Kentucky | | Earle Combs Stadium; Richmond, KY | **W** 10–6 | **Oswald** (6–2) | Faulkner (2–4) | None | ESPN+ | 205 | 21–20 | 12–7 |
| April 25 | Eastern Kentucky | | Earle Combs Stadium; Richmond, KY | **W** 11–8 | **Battle** (2–0) | Schneider (1–2) | **Davenport** (3) | ESPN+ | 211 | 22–20 | 13–7 |
| April 26 | Eastern Kentucky | | Earle Combs Stadium; Richmond, KY | **W** 15–3^{(7)} | **Young** (3–0) | Collins (0–3) | None | | 100 | 23–20 | 14–7 |

May (5-6)
| Date | Opponent | Rank | Site/stadium | Score | Win | Loss | Save | TV | Attendance | Overall record | ASUN record |
|---|---|---|---|---|---|---|---|---|---|---|---|
| May 1 | Bellarmine | | Mike D. Lane Field at Bank Independent Stadium; Florence, AL | **W** 13–3^{(7)} | **Agosto** (2–3) | Sims (0–3) | None | ESPN+ | 757 | 24–20 | 15–7 |
| May 2 | Bellarmine | | Mike D. Lane Field at Bank Independent Stadium; Florence, AL | **L** 8–15 | Oak (2–4) | **Patterson** (4–4) | None | | 566 | 24–21 | 15–8 |
| May 3 | Bellarmine | | Mike D. Lane Field at Bank Independent Stadium; Florence, AL | **L** 6–9 | Rusch (3–1) | **Crumpton** (0–1) | None | ESPN+ | 411 | 24–22 | 15–9 |
| May 5 | Samford | | Mike D. Lane Field at Bank Independent Stadium; Florence, AL | **L** 2–8 | Fredette (1–2) | **Touhey** (2–2) | None | ESPN+ | 312 | 24–23 | — |
| May 8 | Central Arkansas | | Bear Stadium; Conway, AR | **L** 6-11 | Alexander (6-2) | **Oswald** (6-3) | None | ESPN+ | 194 | 24-24 | 15-10 |
| May 9 | Central Arkansas | | Bear Stadium; Conway, AR | **W** 12-4 | **Patterson** (5-4) | Jones (4-3) | None | ESPN+ | 279 | 25-24 | 16-10 |
| May 9 | Central Arkansas | | Bear Stadium; Conway, AR | **L** 3-4 | Alexander (7-2) | **Toney** (0-1) | None | ESPN+ | 357 | 25-25 | 16-11 |
| May 12 | Murray State | | Johnny Reagan Field; Murray, KY | **L** 5-9 | Patterson (2-1) | **Boynar** (0-4) | None | ESPN+ | 516 | 25-26 | |
| May 14 | Austin Peay | | Mike D. Lane Field at Bank Independent Stadium; Florence, AL | **W** 9-2 | **Oswald** (7-3) | Carney (1-1) | None | ESPN+ | 617 | 26-26 | 17-11 |
| May 15 | Austin Peay | | Mike D. Lane Field at Bank Independent Stadium; Florence, AL | **W** 6-1 | **Patterson** (6-4) | Walton (2-4) | None | ESPN+ | 811 | 27-26 | 18-11 |
| May 16 | Austin Peay | | Mike D. Lane Field at Bank Independent Stadium; Florence, AL | **W** 8-4 | **Rice** (1-0) | Hope (3-3) | None | ESPN+ | 777 | 28-26 | 19-11 |

Postseason (0–0)

ASUN tournament (0–0)
| Date | Opponent | Seed | Site/stadium | Score | Win | Loss | Save | TV | Attendance | Overall record | ASUNT record |
|---|---|---|---|---|---|---|---|---|---|---|---|
| May 19 | vs. Jacksonville/Austin Peay | 4 | Melching Field at Conrad Park; DeLand, Florida | – | | | | ESPN+ | | | |
