= 2020 Liberty Flames baseball team =

American college baseball season

2020 Liberty Flames baseball
- Conference: Atlantic Sun
- Record: 10–7 (0–0 ASUN)
- Head coach: Scott Jackson
- Home stadium: Liberty Baseball Stadium

2020 ASUN Conference baseball standings
	Conf.				Overall
Team	W		L	PCT	W		L	PCT
Stetson ‍‍‍	0	–	0	–	11	–	4	.733
Lipscomb ‍‍‍	0	–	0	–	11	–	5	.688
Liberty ‍‍‍	0	–	0	–	10	–	7	.588
Florida Gulf Coast ‍‍‍	0	–	0	–	9	–	7	.563
Kennesaw State ‍‍‍	0	–	0	–	10	–	8	.556
Jacksonville ‍‍‍	0	–	0	–	9	–	9	.500
NJIT ‍‍‍	0	–	0	–	6	–	10	.375
North Florida ‍‍‍	0	–	0	–	4	–	12	.250
North Alabama ‍‍‍	0	–	0	–	3	–	13	.188
‡ – Tournament champion Rankings from D1Baseball

The 2020 Liberty Flames baseball team represented Liberty University in the sport of baseball for the 2020 college baseball season. The Flames competed in Division I of the National Collegiate Athletic Association (NCAA) and the Atlantic Sun Conference. They played their home games at Liberty Baseball Stadium in Lynchburg, Virginia. The team was coached by Scott Jackson, who was in his fourth season at Liberty.

== Previous season ==
The 2019 Flames finished 40–19 overall, and 15–9 in the conference. In the 2019 Atlantic Sun Conference baseball tournament championship game, they beat the Stetson Hatters to win their first ever ASUN title. They lost in the Chapel Hill Regional during the 2019 NCAA Division I baseball tournament.

== Schedule and results ==
2020 Liberty Flames baseball game log
Regular Season

February
Date	Opponent	Rank	Site/stadium	Score	Win	Loss	Save	Attendance	Overall record	ASUN Record
February 14	Clemson		Doug Kingsmore Stadium; Clemson, SC	3–5	Gilbert (1–0)	**Meyer** (0–1)	Spiers (1)	4,657	0–1	0–0
February 15	Clemson		Doug Kingsmore Stadium	0–1	Sharpe (1–0)	**Skirrow** (0–1)	Clayton (1)	4,592	0–2	0–0
February 16	Clemson		Doug Kingsmore Stadium	2–6	Clark (1–0)	**Adametz** (0–1)	None	4,109	0–3	0–0
February 19	Radford		Liberty Baseball Stadium; Lynchburg, VA	4–2	**M. Hand** (1–0)	H. Williams (0–1)	**L. Riley** (1)	1,535	1–3	0–0
February 21	Seton Hall		Liberty Baseball Stadium	4–5	McLinskey (1–0)	**Meyer** (0–2)	Sawyer (1)	1,583	1–4	0–0
February 22	Seton Hall		Liberty Baseball Stadium	3–2	**Skirrow** (1–1)	Thompson (0–1)	**L. Riley** (2)	1,702	2–4	0–0
February 23	Seton Hall		Liberty Baseball Stadium	5–3	**G. Price** (1–0)	Festa (1–1)	**T. Britts** (1)	1,537	3–4	0–0
February 25	Longwood		Liberty Baseball Stadium	16–6	**M. Hand** (2–0)	A. Melnyk (0–1)	None	1,353	4–4	0–0
February 28	Marist		Liberty Baseball Stadium	4–3	**Meyer** (1–2)	Pansini (0–1)	**L. Riley** (3)	1,352	5–4	0–0
February 29	Marist		Liberty Baseball Stadium	6–4	**L. Riley** (1–0)	Pichardo (0–3)	None	1,363	6–4	0–0

March
Date	Opponent	Rank	Site/stadium	Score	Win	Loss	Save	Attendance	Overall record	ASUN Record
March 1	Marist		Liberty Baseball Stadium	4–3	**G. Price** (2–0)	Van Beusekom (0–1)	None	1,377	7–4	0–0
March 3	Elon		Liberty Baseball Stadium	3–0	**M. Hand** (3–0)	Evans (0–3)	**L. Riley** (4)	1,261	8–4	0-0
March 4	East Carolina		Clark-LeClair Stadium; Greenville, NC	0–11	Saylor (2–0)	**Haga** (0–1)	None	2,731	8–5	0-0
March 6	Kent State		Liberty Baseball Stadium	2–3	Albright (2–2)	**Meyer** (1–2)	Zimmerman (1)	1,304	8–6	0-0
March 7	Kent State		Liberty Baseball Stadium	7–2	**L. Riley** (1–0)	C. Romel (1–1)	None	1,542	9–6	0-0
March 8	Kent State		Liberty Baseball Stadium	7–0	**Adametz** (1–1)	Lane (2–1)	**G. Price** (1)	1,316	10–6	0-0
March 11	West Virginia		Monongalia County Ballpark; Morgantown, WV	0–7	T. Strechay (2–1)	**M. Hand** (3–1)	None	974	10–7	0-0
March 13	Ohio State		Nick Swisher Field at Bill Davis Stadium; Columbus, OH	Canceled (COVID-19 pandemic)						
March 14	Ohio State		Nick Swisher Field at Bill Davis Stadium	Canceled (COVID-19 pandemic)						
March 15	Ohio State		Nick Swisher Field at Bill Davis Stadium	Canceled (COVID-19 pandemic)						
March 18	High Point		Liberty Baseball Stadium	Canceled (COVID-19 pandemic)						
March 20	Florida Gulf Coast		Liberty Baseball Stadium	Canceled (COVID-19 pandemic)						
March 21	Florida Gulf Coast		Liberty Baseball Stadium	Canceled (COVID-19 pandemic)						
March 22	Florida Gulf Coast		Liberty Baseball Stadium	Canceled (COVID-19 pandemic)						
March 24	Virginia Tech		English Field; Blacksburg, VA	Canceled (COVID-19 pandemic)						
March 27	UNC Wilmington		Brooks Field; Wilmington, NC	Canceled (COVID-19 pandemic)						
March 28	UNC Wilmington		Brooks Field	Canceled (COVID-19 pandemic)						
March 29	UNC Wilmington		Brooks Field	Canceled (COVID-19 pandemic)						

April
Date	Opponent	Rank	Site/stadium	Score	Win	Loss	Save	Attendance	Overall record	ASUN Record
April 1	North Carolina		Bryson Field at Boshamer Stadium; Chapel Hill, NC	Canceled (COVID-19 pandemic)						
April 3	Lipscomb		Dugan Field; Nashville, TN	Canceled (COVID-19 pandemic)						
April 4	Lipscomb		Dugan Field	Canceled (COVID-19 pandemic)						
April 5	Lipscomb		Dugan Field	Canceled (COVID-19 pandemic)						
April 9	Jacksonville		Liberty Baseball Stadium	Canceled (COVID-19 pandemic)						
April 10	Jacksonville		Liberty Baseball Stadium	Canceled (COVID-19 pandemic)						
April 11	Jacksonville		Liberty Baseball Stadium	Canceled (COVID-19 pandemic)						
April 14	Richmond		Malcolm U. Pitt Field; Richmond, VA	Canceled (COVID-19 pandemic)						
April 17	Kennesaw State		Liberty Baseball Stadium	Canceled (COVID-19 pandemic)						
April 18	Kennesaw State		Liberty Baseball Stadium	Canceled (COVID-19 pandemic)						
April 19	Kennesaw State		Liberty Baseball Stadium	Canceled (COVID-19 pandemic)						
April 21	Virginia		Davenport Field at Disharoon Park; Charlottesville, VA	Canceled (COVID-19 pandemic)						
April 24	NJIT		Bears & Eagles Riverfront Stadium; Newark, NJ	Canceled (COVID-19 pandemic)						
April 25	NJIT		Bears & Eagles Riverfront Stadium	Canceled (COVID-19 pandemic)						
April 26	NJIT		Bears & Eagles Riverfront Stadium	Canceled (COVID-19 pandemic)						
April 29	Virginia Tech		Liberty Baseball Stadium	Canceled (COVID-19 pandemic)						

May
Date	Opponent	Rank	Site/stadium	Score	Win	Loss	Save	Attendance	Overall record	ASUN Record
May 1	North Florida		Harmon Stadium; Jacksonville, FL	Canceled (COVID-19 pandemic)						
May 2	North Florida		Harmon Stadium	Canceled (COVID-19 pandemic)						
May 3	North Florida		Harmon Stadium	Canceled (COVID-19 pandemic)						
May 8	North Alabama		Liberty Baseball Stadium	Canceled (COVID-19 pandemic)						
May 9	North Alabama		Liberty Baseball Stadium	Canceled (COVID-19 pandemic)						
May 10	North Alabama		Liberty Baseball Stadium	Canceled (COVID-19 pandemic)						
May 12	Radford		Radford Baseball Stadium; Radford, VA	Canceled (COVID-19 pandemic)						
May 14	Stetson		Melching Field at Conrad Park; DeLand, FL	Canceled (COVID-19 pandemic)						
May 15	Stetson		Melching Field at Conrad Park	Canceled (COVID-19 pandemic)						
May 16	Stetson		Melching Field at Conrad Park	Canceled (COVID-19 pandemic)						

Post-Season

ASUN Tournament
Date	Opponent	Seed	Site/stadium	Score	Win	Loss	Save	Attendance	Overall record	ASUNT Record
May 20–23			Swanson Stadium; Fort Myers, FL	Canceled (COVID-19 pandemic)						

Legend: = Win = Loss = Cancelled
Bold = Liberty team member

Schedule source:
