= Larry Owens =

Larry Owens may refer to:

- Larry Owens (basketball)
- Larry Owens (actor)
- Larry Owens (baseball)

== See also ==
- Larry Owen, Major League Baseball catcher
