= Chris Dominguez =

American baseball player (born 1986)

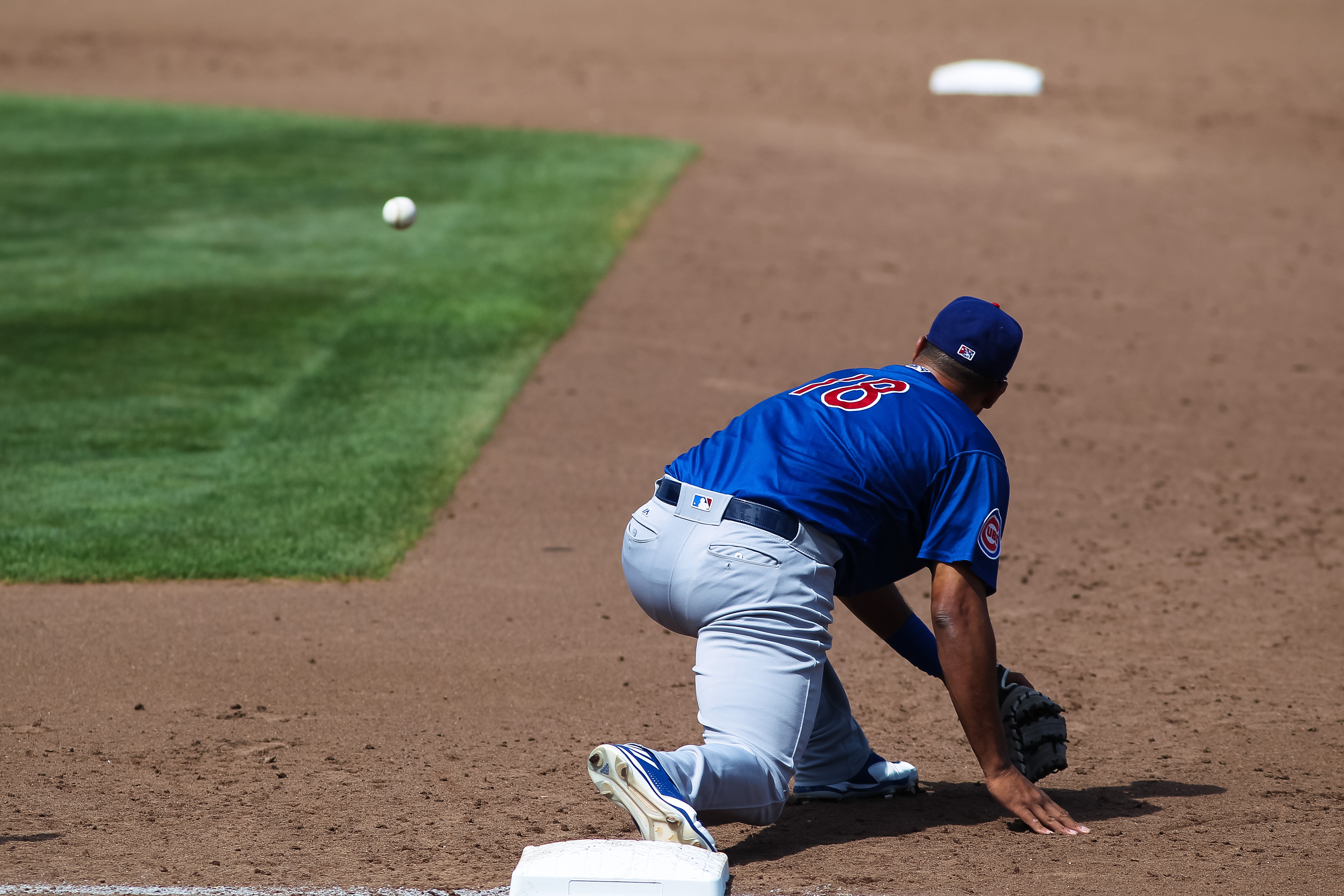
- Dominguez with the Iowa Cubs in 2017

Miami Hurricanes
- Assistant coach
- Born: November 22, 1986 (age 39); Los Angeles, California, U.S.
- Batted: Right Threw: Right

MLB debut
- September 3, 2014, for the San Francisco Giants

Last appearance
- June 27, 2015, for the Cincinnati Reds

MLB statistics
- Batting average: .175
- Home runs: 2
- Runs batted in: 5
- Stats at Baseball Reference

Teams
- San Francisco Giants (2014); Cincinnati Reds (2015)

Christopher Omar Dominguez (born November 22, 1986) is an American former professional baseball third baseman, who is currently an assistant coach for the Miami Hurricanes baseball team. He previously was the head baseball coach of the Bellarmine Knights from 2023 to 2024. He played college baseball for the Louisville from 2007 to 2009. He played in Major League Baseball (MLB) for 2 seasons with the San Francisco Giants and Cincinnati Reds.

== Amateur career ==
Dominguez attended Gulliver Prep in Coral Gables, Florida. He was drafted out of high school by the Texas Rangers in the 17th round of the 2005 Major League Baseball draft, but he did not sign, opting to attend college.

Dominguez attended the University of Louisville, where he played college baseball for the Louisville Cardinals baseball team of the Big East Conference. In 2006, he played summer ball for the Newport Gulls. As a freshman in 2007, Dominguez was named to a First Team College Freshman All-American at designated hitter and Columbia (MO) Regional MVP in the College World Series. In the summer of 2007 he played for the Harwich Mariners of the Cape Cod Baseball League (CCBL).

In 2008, he was named a Second Team College All-American and Big East Conference All-Star at third base, and Big East Conference Player of the Year. After the season, he was drafted by the Colorado Rockies in the fifth round of the 2008 Major League Baseball draft, but he opted to return to Louisville for another season. In the summer of 2008, he returned to the CCBL to play for the Hyannis Mets, where he was named a league all-star, and made headlines by crushing three home runs in a single game, the first CCBL player to accomplish the feat since baseball hall of famer Frank Thomas did it twenty years earlier.

In 2009, he was named a First Team College All-American and Big East Conference All-Star third baseman and Big East Conference Player of the Year.

== Professional career ==
=== San Francisco Giants ===
The San Francisco Giants selected Dominguez in the third round of the 2009 Major League Baseball draft; he signed with the Giants. Dominguez made his professional debut with the Arizona Giants of the Rookie-level Arizona League and Salem Keizer Volcanoes of the Low-A Northwest League in 2010. He played for the Augusta GreenJackets of the Single-A South Atlantic League (SAL) in 2010, and he was named the SAL All-Star third baseman in 2010. In 2011, Dominguez began the season with the San Jose Giants of the High-A California League, before he was promoted to the Richmond Flying Squirrels of the Double-A Eastern League. He was invited to spring training in 2012.

Dominguez was called up to the majors for the first time on September 1, 2014. On September 21, Dominguez hit his first major league home run off of Ian Kennedy, accounting for the only runs of the game in an 8–2 loss to the San Diego Padres.

On February 4, 2015, Dominguez was released by the Giants.

=== Cincinnati Reds ===
On February 11, 2015, Dominguez signed a minor league contract that included an invitation to spring training with the Cincinnati Reds. He spent time with both the Triple-A Louisville Bats and the Reds that season. Dominguez elected free agency on November 6.

=== Boston Red Sox ===
On December 15, 2015, Dominguez signed a minor league contract with the Boston Red Sox that included an invitation to spring training. He spent the entire 2016 season with the Triple-A Pawtucket Red Sox, playing in 77 games and hitting .241/.275/.439 with 13 home runs, 39 RBI, and seven stolen bases. Dominguez elected free agency following the season on November 7, 2016.

=== Chicago Cubs ===
Dominguez signed a minor league contract with the Chicago Cubs organization on January 16, 2017, which included an invite to spring training. He spent the year with the Triple-A Iowa Cubs, playing in 102 games and hitting .284/.323/.443 with 11 home runs, 45 RBI, and 12 stolen bases. Dominguez elected free agency following the season on November 6.

=== Washington Nationals ===
On December 19, 2017, Dominguez signed a minor league contract with the Washington Nationals. He played in 84 games for the Triple–A Syracuse Chiefs, batting .243/.293/.406 with nine home runs, 45 RBI, and seven stolen bases. Dominguez elected free agency following the season on November 2, 2018.

Dominguez later re-signed with Washington on a minor league deal on March 14, 2019. Dominguez was released by the Nationals organization on May 25.

== Coaching career ==
On June 13, 2022, Dominguez was named the head baseball coach of the Bellarmine Knights.

== Head coaching record ==
Record table
Season	Team	Overall	Conference	Standing	Postseason
Bellarmine Knights (ASUN Conference) (2023–2024)
2023	Bellarmine	13–42	8–22	14th	
2024	Bellarmine	10–45	9–21	12th	
Bellarmine:		23–87	17–43		
Total:		23–87			
National champion Postseason invitational champion Conference regular season champion Conference regular season and conference tournament champion Division regular season champion Division regular season and conference tournament champion Conference tournament champion
