= 2012 NCAA Division III baseball tournament =

- Season: 2012
- Teams: 56
- Finals site: Time Warner Cable Field at Fox Cities Stadium; Grand Chute, Wisconsin
- Champions: Marietta (6th title)
- Runner-up: Wheaton (MA)

The 2012 NCAA Division III baseball tournament was played at the end of the 2012 NCAA Division III baseball season to determine the 37th national champion of college baseball at the NCAA Division III level. The tournament concluded with eight teams competing at Time Warner Cable Field at Fox Cities Stadium in Grand Chute, Wisconsin for the championship. Eight regional tournaments were held to determine the participants in the World Series. Regional tournaments were contested in double-elimination format, with four regions consisting of six teams, and four consisting of eight, for a total of 8 regions and 56 teams participating in the tournament, up from 55 in 2011. The tournament champion was Marietta, who defeated Wheaton (MA) for the championship.

== Bids ==
The 56 competing teams were:

Teams

Central Regional (6 teams – Millington, TN)

Birmingham‑Southern

Washington University in St. Louis

DePauw

Emory

Webster

Illinois Wesleyan

New England Regional (8 teams – Mansfield, CT)

Wheaton (MA)

St. Joseph’s (ME)

Trinity (CT)

Keene State

Western New England

Southern Maine

Bowdoin

Bridgewater State

New York (Farmingdale) Regional (6 teams)

SUNY Cortland

Farmingdale State

Ithaca

Misericordia

Skidmore

Castleton

Mid‑Atlantic Regional (8 teams – Lakewood, NJ)

Keystone

Kean

Alvernia

Ramapo

Neumann

Haverford

Drew

Daniel Webster

Mideast Regional (8 teams – Marietta, OH)

Marietta

Washington & Jefferson

Adrian

St. John Fisher

Westminster (PA)

Wooster

Manchester

La Roche

Midwest Regional (8 teams – Whitewater, WI)

St. Thomas (MN)

Wisconsin–La Crosse

North Park

Wisconsin–Whitewater

Concordia–Chicago

St. Scholastica

Aurora

St. Norbert

South Regional (6 teams – Newport News, VA)

Christopher Newport

Salisbury

Shenandoah

Rowan

Lynchburg

Messiah

West Regional (6 teams – McMinnville, OR)

Concordia (TX)

Trinity (TX)

Whitworth

La Verne

Coe

Saint John’s (MN)

== Regionals ==
Bold indicates winner.

=== Central Regional ===
USA Stadium-Millington, TN (Host: Rhodes College)

First round
1	**Birmingham-Southern**	**7**
6	Illinois Wesleyan	4
2	Washington-St. Louis	5
5	**Webster**	**11**
3	**DePauw**	**2**
4	Emory	0

Second round/elimination round 1
**Birmingham-Southern**	**6**
Emory	1
**Webster**	**10**
DePauw	2
**Illinois Wesleyan**	**3**
Washington-St. Louis	2

Semifinals/elimination round 2
Birmingham-Southern	1
**Webster**	**6**
DePauw	0
**Illinois Wesleyan**	**6**

Elimination final
**Birmingham-Southern**	**9**
Illinois Wesleyan	7

Final
**Webster**	**3**	--
Birmingham-Southern	2	--

=== New England Regional ===
Eastern Baseball Stadium-Mansfield, CT (Host: Eastern Connecticut State University)

First round/elimination round 1	Second round/elimination round 2	Semifinals/elimination semifinals	Finals
4	Keene State	1
5	**Western New England**	**7**
Western New England	3
**Wheaton (MA)**	**10**
1	**Wheaton (MA)**	**6**
8	Bridgewater State	2
**Wheaton (MA)**	**6**
Trinity (CT)	4
3	**Trinity (CT)**	**13**
6	Southern Maine	8
**Trinity (CT)**	**4**
St. Joseph's (ME)	0
2	**St. Joseph's (ME)**	**2**
7	Bowdoin	0	**Wheaton (MA)**	4	**2**
Western New England	**6**	0
Lower round 1	Lower round 2	Lower round 3	Lower final
**St. Joseph's (ME)**	**6**
**Keene State**	**3**	Keene State	1	Trinity (CT)	1
Bridgewater State	2	St. Joseph's (ME)	0	**Western New England**	**2**
**Western New England**	**4**
**Western New England**	**7**
Southern Maine	4	Bowdoin	1
**Bowdoin**	**6**

=== New York Regional ===
Farmingdale State Baseball Stadium-East Farmingdale, NY (Host: State University of New York at Farmingdale)

First round
1	**SUNY Cortland**	**7**
6	Castleton State	6
2	**Farmingdale State**	**10**
5	Skidmore	2
3	**Ithaca**	**2**
4	Misericordia	1

Second round/elimination round 1
**SUNY Cortland**	**7**
Misericordia	2
**Farmingdale State**	**2**
Ithaca	0
**Castleton State**	**8**
Skidmore	1

Semifinals/elimination round 2
**SUNY Cortland**	**4**
Farmingdale State	2
**Ithaca**	**5**
Castleton State	2

Elimination final
**Farmingdale State**	**4**
Ithaca	3^{10}

Final
**SUNY Cortland**	**2**	--
Farmingdale State	1	--

=== Mid-Atlantic Regional ===
FirstEnergy Park-Lakewood, NJ (Host: Kean University)

First round/elimination round 1	Second round/elimination round 2	Semifinals/elimination semifinals	Finals
4	**Ramapo**	**10**
5	Neumann	5
Ramapo	4
**Keystone**	**5**
1	**Keystone**	**13**
8	Daniel Webster	7
Keystone	0
**Kean**	**2**
3	**Alvernia**	**8**
6	Haverford	3
Alvernia	4
**Kean**	**12**
2	**Kean**	**9**
7	Drew	3	**Kean**	**6**	--
Ramapo	4	--
Lower round 1	Lower round 2	Lower round 3	Lower final
Alvernia	3
**Neumann**	**11**	**Neumann**	**5**	Keystone	2
Daniel Webster	4	Neumann	5	**Ramapo**	**3**
**Ramapo**	**6**
**Ramapo**	**6**
**Haverford**	**11**	Haverford	4
Drew	9^{12}

=== Midwest Regional ===
Prucha Field at James B. Miller Stadium-Whitewater, WI (Host: University of Wisconsin-Whitewater)

First round/elimination round 1	Second round/elimination round 2	Semifinals/elimination semifinals	Finals
4	**Wisconsin-Whitewater**	**2**
5	Concordia-Chicago	1^{10}
Wisconsin-Whitewater	2
**St. Thomas (MN)**	**5**
1	**St. Thomas (MN)**	**5**
8	St. Norbert	1
**St. Thomas (MN)**	**22**
St. Scholastica	2
3	North Park	7
6	**St. Scholastica**	**8**
**St. Scholastica**	**8**
Aurora	4^{13}
2	Wisconsin-La Crosse	1
7	**Aurora**	**2**	**St. Thomas (MN)**	**10**	--
Wisconsin-Whitewater	6	--
Lower round 1	Lower round 2	Lower round 3	Lower final
**Aurora**	**11**
Concordia-Chicago	0	St. Norbert	5	St. Scholastica	5
**St. Norbert**	**5**	Aurora	5	**Wisconsin-Whitewater**	**6**
**Wisconsin-Whitewater**	**6**^{10}
**Wisconsin-Whitewater**	**10**
North Park	2	Wisconsin-La Crosse	7
**Wisconsin-La Crosse**	4

=== South Regional ===
Captains Park-Newport News, VA (Host: Christopher Newport University)

First round
1	Christopher Newport	1
6	**Messiah**	**3**
2	**Salisbury**	**7**
5	Lynchburg	2
3	**Shenandoah**	**5**
4	Rowan	4

Second round/elimination round 1
Messiah	6
**Rowan**	**9**
**Christopher Newport**	**7**
Lynchburg	1
Salisbury	1
**Shenandoah**	**6**
Messiah	3
**Salisbury**	**9**

Third round/elimination round 2
Rowan	2
**Christopher Newport**	**4**
Shenandoah	1
**Salisbury**	**2**^{14}

Elimination final
**Christopher Newport**	**9**
Shenandoah	5

Final
**Christopher Newport**	**12**
Salisbury	3

=== Mideast Regional ===
Don Schaly Stadium-Marietta, OH (Host: Marietta College)

First round/elimination round 1	Second round/elimination round 2	Semifinals/elimination semifinals	Finals
4	**St. John Fisher**	**13**
5	Westminster (PA)	7
**St. John Fisher**	**5**
Marietta	2
1	**Marietta**	**12**
8	La Roche	3
St. John Fisher	8
**Manchester**	**11**
3	**Adrian**	**8**
6	Wooster	4
Adrian	7
**Manchester**	**13**
2	Washington & Jefferson	3
7	**Manchester**	**13**	Manchester	3	3
**Marietta**	**6**	**7**
Lower round 1	Lower round 2	Lower round 3	Lower final
**Adrian**	**3**
Westminster (PA)	2	La Roche	2	St. John Fisher	2
**La Roche**	**3**	Adrian	4	**Marietta**	**9**
**Marietta**	**11**
**Marietta**	**9**
Wooster	0	Washington & Jefferson	5
**Washington & Jefferson**	**8**

=== West Regional ===
Roy Helser Field and Jim Wright Stadium-McMinnville, OR (Host: Linfield College)

First round
1	**Concordia (TX)**	**6**
6	St. John's (MN)	3
2	**Trinity (TX)**	**2**
5	Coe	0
3	**Whitworth**	**5**
4	La Verne	0

Second round/elimination round 1
Concordia(TX)	5
**La Verne**	**8**
St. John's (MN)	2
**Coe**	**7**
**Trinity (TX)**	**8**
Whitworth	3
Concordia (TX)	1
**Whitworth**	**5**

Third round/elimination round 2
La Verne	0
**Coe**	**5**
Trinity (TX)	0
**Whitworth**	**12**

Elimination final
Coe	5
**Trinity (TX)**	**6**^{11}

Final
Trinity (TX)	2
**Whitworth**	**9**

== World Series ==
Time Warner Cable Field at Fox Cities Stadium-Grand Chute, WI (Host: University of Wisconsin-Oshkosh/Lawrence University/Fox Cities Convention and Visitors Bureau)

Upper round 1
C5	Webster	2
NE1	Wheaton (MA)	3
NY1	SUNY Cortland	10
MA2	Kean	5
MW1	St. Thomas (MN)	12
S1	Christopher Newport	7
ME1	Marietta	13
W3	Whitworth	2

Upper round 2
Wheaton (MA)	6
SUNY Cortland	1
St. Thomas (MN)	3
Marietta	1
Lower round 1
Webster	8
Kean	7
Christopher Newport	2
Whitworth	7

Upper final
Wheaton (MA)	13
St. Thomas (MN)	9
Lower round 2
Marietta	12
Webster	7
SUNY Cortland	5
Whitworth	4

Semifinals
Wheaton (MA)	5
Marietta	6^{10}
St. Thomas (MN)	7
SUNY Cortland	6

Preliminary final
Marietta	5
St. Thomas (MN)	0

Final
Wheaton (MA)	2
Marietta	7

== See also ==
- 2012 NCAA Division I baseball tournament
- 2012 NCAA Division II baseball tournament
- 2012 NAIA World Series
