= Jad Prachniak =

American baseball coach

Current position
- Title: Head coach
- Team: North Alabama
- Conference: UAC
- Record: 84–129–1

Biographical details
- Born: August 5, 1981 (age 45); Lincoln, Rhode Island, U.S.

Playing career
- 2001–2004: Rhode Island
- Position: Pitcher

Coaching career (HC unless noted)
- 2005: Rhode Island (Asst)
- 2006–2011: William & Mary (P/RC)
- 2012–2020: West Chester
- 2021–2022: Delaware (AHC/RC)
- 2023–present: North Alabama

Head coaching record
- Overall: 357–256–2
- Tournaments: NCAA DI: 0–0; NCAA DII: 17–8

Accomplishments and honors

Championships
- 2× NCAA Division II (2012, 2017); 2× PSAC Tournament (2012, 2016); PSAC Eastern Division (2018); ASUN Gold Division (2026)

Awards
- 3× PSAC Coach of the Year (2012, 2015, 2017)

Jad Prachinak (born August 5, 1981) is a baseball coach and former pitcher, who is the current head baseball coach of the North Alabama Lions. He played college baseball at Rhode Island from 2001 to 2004. He served as the head coach of the West Chester Golden Rams (2012–2020).

== Playing career ==
Prachniak grew up in Lincoln, Rhode Island, where he attended Lincoln High School, where he was a letterwinner for the Lions in baseball. Prachniak would go on to pitch for the Rams, bouncing back and forth between the rotation and bullpen. He made 14 starts for the Rams, pitching to a 4–5 win–loss record with a 6.04 earned run average.

== Coaching career ==
Prachniak began his coaching career immediately following his playing career. He served as a volunteer assistant for Rhode Island as well as the pitching coach for The Prout School, while finishing up his degree in 2005. When Rhode Island head coach, Frank Leoni took the head coaching job at William & Mary, he brought Prachniak with him as the Tribe's pitching coach. On June 30, 2011, Prachniak was named the head coach of the West Chester Golden Rams. Prachniak led the Golden Rams to a National Championship season, in just his first year. The Golden Rams became champions again in 2017. On December 4, 2020, Prachniak stepped down as the head coach of the Golden Rams to take an assistant coaching position on the Delaware Fightin' Blue Hens staff.

On June 23, 2022, Prachniak was named the head coach of the North Alabama Lions.

== Head coaching record ==
Record table
Season	Team	Overall	Conference	Standing	Postseason
West Chester Golden Rams (Pennsylvania State Athletic Conference) (2012–2020)
2012	West Chester	46–10	16–8	1st (Eastern)	College World Series Champions
2013	West Chester	25–24–1	12–12	4th (Eastern)	PSAC Tournament
2014	West Chester	25–18	16–12	3rd (Eastern)	PSAC Tournament
2015	West Chester	27–15	20–8	2nd (Eastern)	NCAA Regional
2016	West Chester	37–14	20–8	2nd (Eastern)	NCAA Regional
2017	West Chester	44–11	22–6	1st (Eastern)	College World Series Champions
2018	West Chester	31–17	20–8	1st (Eastern)	NCAA Regional
2019	West Chester	31–16	19–9	2nd (Eastern)	NCAA Regional
2020	West Chester	7–2	0–0		Season canceled due to COVID-19
West Chester:		273–127–1	145–71		
North Alabama Lions (ASUN Conference) (2023–present)
2023	North Alabama	14–37	8–22	13th	
2024	North Alabama	18–35–1	10–19–1	10th	
2025	North Alabama	24–31	16–14	3rd (Gold)	ASUN tournament
2026	North Alabama	28–26	19–11	T–1st (Gold)	
North Alabama:		84–129–1	53–66–1		
Total:		357–256–2			
National champion Postseason invitational champion Conference regular season champion Conference regular season and conference tournament champion Division regular season champion Division regular season and conference tournament champion Conference tournament champion
