= 2012 NCAA Division II baseball tournament =

- Season: 2012
- Finals site: USA Baseball National Training Complex; Cary, North Carolina
- Champions: West Chester (1st title)
- Runner-up: Delta State (4th CWS Appearance)
- Winning coach: Jad Prachniak (1st title)
- MOP: Joe Gunkel, P (West Chester)
- Attendance: 17,585

The 2012 NCAA Division II baseball tournament was the postseason tournament hosted by the NCAA to determine the national champion of baseball among its Division II members at the end of the 2012 NCAA Division II baseball season.

The final, eight-team double elimination tournament, also known as the College World Series, was played at the USA Baseball National Training Complex in Cary, North Carolina from May 26–June 2, 2012.

West Chester defeated Delta State in the championship game, 9–0, to claim the Golden Rams' first Division II national title.

== Bracket ==
=== College World Series ===
- Note: Losers of each round were shifted to the opposing bracket.

First Rounds; May 26–29, 2012	Second Rounds; May 28–May 30, 2012
West Chester	4
Chico State	0
West Chester	4
SNHU	0
Minnesota State	2
SNHU	3
Bracket One
Indianapolis	2
St. Mary's (TX)	13
Catawba	5
St. Mary's (TX)	4
Catawba	2
Indianapolis	1
Catawba	5
Delta State	6
St. Mary's (TX)	1
Delta State	4
Bracket Two
Chico State	5
Minnesota State	6
SNHU	0
Minnesota State	6

Semifinals; May 31–June 1, 2012
West Chester	2
Catawba	1
Delta State	0	6
Minnesota State	1	5

Championship; June 2, 2012
West Chester	9
Delta State	0

== See also ==
- 2012 NCAA Division I baseball tournament
- 2012 NCAA Division III baseball tournament
- 2012 NAIA World Series
