= Mike Keehn =

Collegiate baseball coach

Biographical details
- Born: November 8, 1961 (age 63); Kearney, Nebraska, U.S.

Playing career
- 1981–1983: Kearney State College
- 1983: Tri-City Triplets
- Position(s): Shortstop

Coaching career (HC unless noted)
- 1985–1988: Kansas City Kansas Community College (asst)
- 1989–2008: North Alabama (asst)
- 2009–2022: North Alabama

Head coaching record
- Overall: 346–333–1
- Tournaments: Gulf South 10–11; A-SUN 0–0; NCAA: 0–0

Mike Jeffrey Keehn is an American college baseball coach and former shortstop. Keehn served as the head baseball coach of the North Alabama Lions (2009–2022).

== Early life ==
Keehn attended Kearney High School in Kearney, Nebraska. Keehn then accepted a scholarship to attend Kearney State College. He played middle infield for the Lopers, where he was named an honorable mention NAIA All-American. Keehn was drafted by the Texas Rangers, and spend the end of the 1983 season as a member of the Tri-City Triplets.

== Coaching career ==
In 1985, Keehn was named an assistant coach at Kansas City Kansas Community College. In 1988, Keehn became an assistant at the University of North Alabama. In the fall of 2008, Keehn was named the Head coach of the North Alabama Lions baseball program. On April 8, 2018, Keehn got his 300th win at North Alabama. Retired from coaching on 5/21/22.

== Head coaching record ==
Statistics overview
Season	Team	Overall	Conference	Standing	Postseason
North Alabama Lions (Gulf South Conference) (2009–2018)
2009	North Alabama	32–20	6–8	5th (East)	
2010	North Alabama	29–24	8–7	3rd (East)	Gulf South Tournament
2011	North Alabama	37–14	12–4	2nd (East)	NCAA Regional
2012	North Alabama	39–18	15–9	4th	NCAA Regional
2013	North Alabama	28–21–1	16–10	4th	Gulf South Tournament
2014	North Alabama	26–27	14–16	8th	Gulf South Tournament
2015	North Alabama	27–16	15–14	8th	
2016	North Alabama	25–22	15–19	8th	
2017	North Alabama	34–19	21–12	3rd	Gulf South Tournament
2018	North Alabama	31–20	19–11	5th	Gulf South Tournament
North Alabama:			141-110		
North Alabama Lions (ASUN Conference) (2019–2022)
2019	North Alabama	16–38	7–16	8th	
2020	North Alabama	3–13			Season canceled on March 12 due to Coronavirus pandemic
2021	North Alabama	7–40	6–15	5th (North)	
2022	North Alabama	12–41	5–25	6th (West)	
North Alabama:		346–333–1	18–56		
Total:		346–333–1			
National champion Postseason invitational champion Conference regular season champion Conference regular season and conference tournament champion Division regular season champion Division regular season and conference tournament champion Conference tournament champion
