= WQLU =

Radio station at Liberty University in Lynchburg, Virginia

The Light
- Lynchburg, Virginia; United States
- Broadcast area: Metro Lynchburg
- Frequencies: Formerly 90.9 MHz, now internet radio
- Branding: The Light

Programming
- Format: Contemporary Christian

Ownership
- Owner: Liberty University

History
- First air date: February 1, 1993; 33 years ago
- Former call signs: WWMC (1993–2015); WQLU (2015–2023)
- Call sign meaning: Liberty University

Technical information
- Licensing authority: FCC
- Facility ID: 37248
- Class: A
- Power: 100 watts
- HAAT: 184 meters (604 ft)
- Transmitter coordinates: 37°20′56.0″N 79°10′5.0″W

Links
- Public license information: Light Public file; LMS
- Webcast: Listen Live
- Website: WQLU Online

The Light, formerly WQLU (90.9 FM), is a non-commercial internet radio station in Lynchburg, Virginia. It broadcasts a Contemporary Christian radio format and is owned and operated by Liberty University. The station aired Liberty University Flames athletics.

WQLU was licensed for an effective radiated power (ERP) of 100 watts. The transmitter is off Candlers Mountain Road in Lynchburg. It operated from 1993 until its license was canceled in 2023. Today The Light Radio Station is solely an internet radio station.

The Light Radio station has tons of programming. They broadcast Liberty University's Convocation Service on Wednesday and Friday Mornings. They also broadcast Liberty University's Campus Community Service on Wednesday Evenings. The Light is also home to Liberty Flames Ice Hockey.

== History ==
Liberty University (then known as Liberty Baptist College) got its first student-run radio station in 1980, on the AM dial. It was a carrier current station available on 550 AM but only covering the campus.

On October 8, 1992, the Federal Communications Commission (FCC) granted the school a construction permit to build an FM station at 100 watts on 90.9 MHz. Its original call sign was WWMC (for "Wall to Wall Music"). The station signed on the air on February 1, 1993. During off-hours, a Christian music service from Boston was broadcast, when Liberty student DJs were not available.

After a transmitter fire, the station was off the air from June to August 1993. In 1999, the station switched from its mainstream Christian contemporary sound to a more youthful, upbeat Christian Top 40 playlist. In 2003, the station began holding on-the-air fundraisers for listener support. The station changed its call sign to WQLU in the spring of 2015.

On September 29, 2023, the FCC issued an order cancelling WQLU's license to broadcast, and requiring the university to pay a fine of $10,000, after discovering that the station had been broadcasting "from a different tower and at different geographic coordinates (...) than specified in the Station’s license." The license holder was also sanctioned for making "incorrect statements" to the FCC.

After 90.9 The Light went off of the radio airwaves, the radio station rebranded and is now The Light, where it only broadcasts over the internet as an internet radio station.
