= Larry Owens (baseball) =

American baseball player and coach

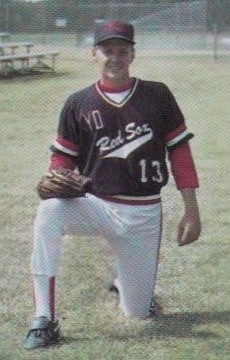

Current position
- Team: Spalding Golden Eagles
- Conference: SLIAC

Biographical details
- Born: December 31, 1968 (age 57)

Playing career
- 1987: Bellarmine
- 1988: Vincennes
- 1989–1990: Armstrong State
- 1990: Pulaski Braves
- Position: Pitcher

Coaching career (HC unless noted)
- 1994: Wabash Valley (asst)
- 1995: Missouri State (asst)
- 1996–1997: Louisville (PC)
- 1998–1999: Austin Peay (PC)
- 2000–2004: Memphis (PC)
- 2005: San Diego Surf Dawgs (PC)
- 2007–2010: Kannapolis Intimidators (PC)
- 2011–2013: Bristol White Sox (PC)
- 2014–2022: Bellarmine

Head coaching record
- Overall: 212–225
- Tournaments: NCAA DI: 0–0; NCAA DII: 2–6

Lawrence W. Owens (born December 31, 1968) is an American baseball coach and former pitcher. Owens played college baseball at Bellarmine before transferring to Vincennes and Armstrong State and in Minor League Baseball (MiLB) for one season in 1990. He served as the head coach of the Bellarmine Knights (2014–2022).

== Playing career ==
Owens attended Jeffersonville High School in Jeffersonville, Indiana, where he played for the school's baseball teams where he pitched. He then attended Bellarmine University in 1986 before transferring to Vincennes University and ending up at Armstrong State University. In 1988, he played collegiate summer baseball for the Yarmouth–Dennis Red Sox of the Cape Cod Baseball League (CCBL). As a senior in 1990, Owens was named an honorable mention All-American. He drafted in the 27th round of the 1990 Major League Baseball draft by the Atlanta Braves.

== Coaching career ==
In 1997, Owens returned to the CCBL as pitching coach of the Falmouth Commodores. After being the pitching coach for the San Diego Surf Dawgs, Owens joined the Boston Red Sox as an area scout in November, 2005.

On August 7, 2013, Owens was named the head baseball coach at Bellarmine University. Owens resigned from his position with the Knights following the conclusion of the 2022 season. He had a 212–225 record over nine seasons.

On December 15, 2025, Owens was named head baseball coach at Spalding University in Louisville, Kentucky.

== Head coaching record ==
Statistics overview
Season	Team	Overall	Conference	Standing	Postseason
Bellarmine Knights (Great Lakes Valley Conference) (2014–2020)
2014	Bellarmine	19–31	10–26	8th (East)	
2015	Bellarmine	28–24	20–16	3rd (East)	GLVC Tournament
2016	Bellarmine	25–26	15–11	3rd (East)	GLVC Tournament
2017	Bellarmine	34–21	20–8	2nd (East)	NCAA Midwest Regional
2018	Bellarmine	38–19	16–8	2nd (East)	NCAA Midwest Regional
2019	Bellarmine	34–21	20–13	7th	NCAA Midwest Regional
2020	Bellarmine	10–4	3–0		Season canceled due to COVID-19
Bellarmine:			104-82		
Bellarmine Knights (ASUN_Conference) (2021–2022)
2021	Bellarmine	13–36	8–16	4th (North)	ASUN Tournament
2022	Bellarmine	11–43	8–22	5th (West)	
Bellarmine:		212–225	16–38		
Total:		212–225			
National champion Postseason invitational champion Conference regular season champion Conference regular season and conference tournament champion Division regular season champion Division regular season and conference tournament champion Conference tournament champion
