= Kevin Keehn =

United States Air Force general

Kevin J. Keehn is an American air force reserve brigadier general and commercial airline pilot. He is the commander of the New Jersey Air National Guard and a first officer at JetBlue.
