= Knights Field =

Baseball Park in Louisville, Kentucky, United States

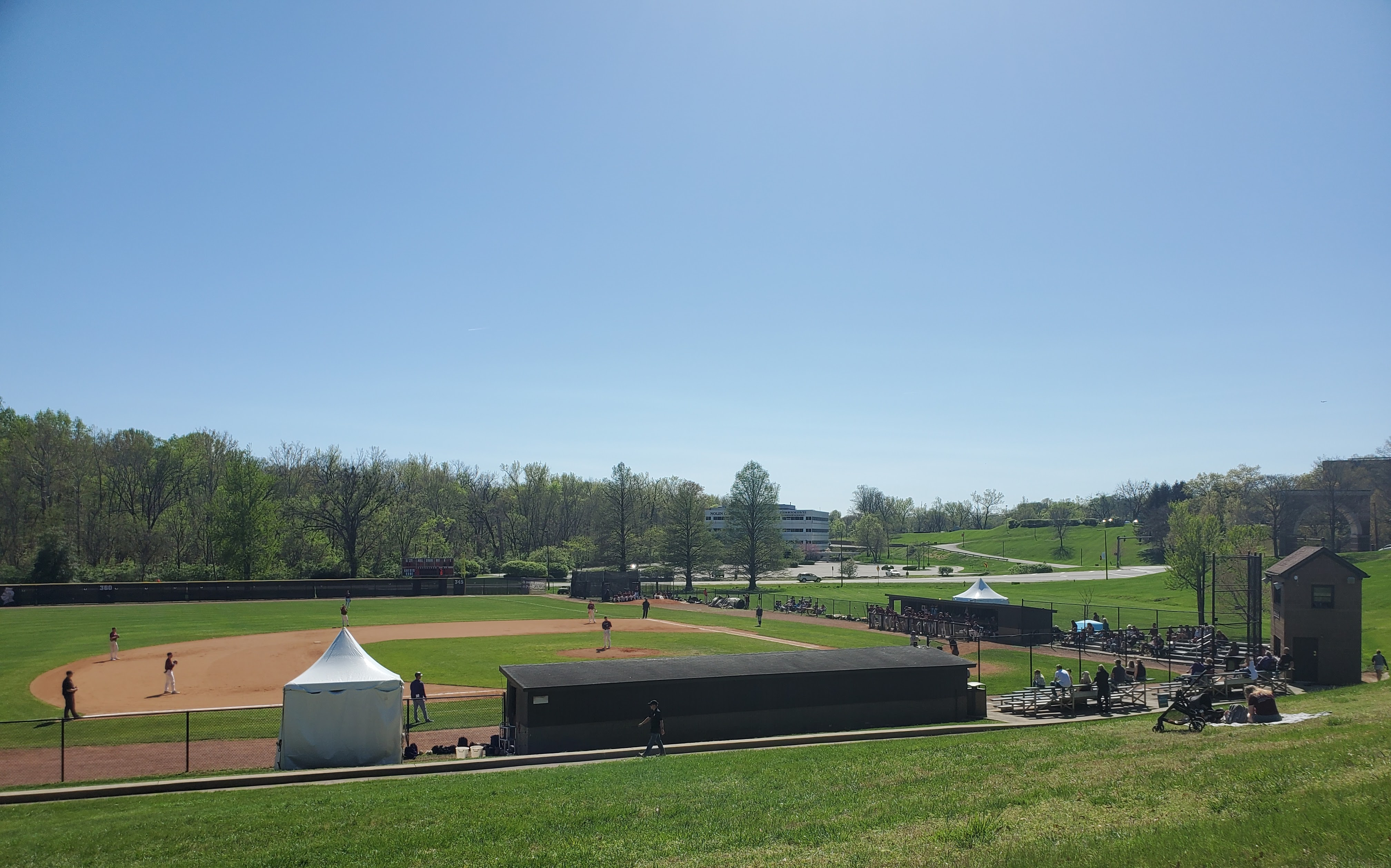
- Interactive map of Knights Field
- Address: 2100 Treece Terrace
- Location: Louisville, Kentucky, 40205
- Coordinates: 38.217485°N 85.705965°W
- Owner: Bellarmine University
- Operator: Bellarmine University
- Type: Stadium
- Event: Baseball
- Surface: Grass
- Scoreboard: Daktronics
- Field size: LF: 355 ft (108.2 m); LC: 360 ft (109.7 m); CF: 380 ft (115.8 m); RC: 360 ft (109.7 m); RF: 335 ft (102.1 m)

Construction
- Groundbreaking: 1952
- Built: 1953
- Opened: 1954

Tenant
- Bellarmine Knights baseball (NCAA) 1954–present

Website
- athletics.bellarmine.edu/sports/2015/1/13/BB_0113150257.aspx

Knights Field is a baseball park located on the campus of Bellarmine University in Louisville, Kentucky. It is home of the Bellarmine Knights baseball team.

With the Knights making the jump to NCAA Division I in 2020, the university announced that they would be prioritizing upgrades to Knights Field.

== See also ==
- List of NCAA Division I baseball venues
