= Noah Skirrow =

Canadian baseball player (born 1998)

Toros de Tijuana – No. 32
- Pitcher
- Born: July 21, 1998 (age 28); Cambridge, Ontario, Canada
- Bats: Right Throws: Right

Noah Smith Daniel Skirrow (born July 21, 1998) is a Canadian professional baseball pitcher for the Toros de Tijuana of the Mexican League.

== Early life ==
Skirrow is from Cambridge, Ontario, and was raised in Stoney Creek. He attended Cardinal Newman Catholic School. He also played for the Ontario Blue Jays of the Premier Baseball League of Ontario.

== College career ==
Skirrow enrolled at Liberty University and played college baseball for the Liberty Flames for three years. As a sophomore, he led the Atlantic Sun Conference in strikeouts per nine innings pitched. In 2019, he played collegiate summer baseball with the Orleans Firebirds of the Cape Cod Baseball League and was named a league all-star.

== Professional career ==
=== Philadelphia Phillies ===
After Skirrow went undrafted in the 2020 Major League Baseball draft, which had been cut from 40 rounds to five due to the COVID-19 pandemic, the Philadelphia Phillies signed Skirrow as a free agent for the maximum allowed US$20,000 signing bonus. Skirrow did not appear for the organization in 2020 after signing due to the cancellation of the minor-league season as a result of the pandemic.

He made his professional debut in 2021, splitting the year between the rookie-level Florida Complex League Phillies, High-A Jersey Shore BlueClaws, and Double-A Reading Fightin Phils. In 18 total appearances (10 starts), Skirrow compiled a 1–5 record and 4.34 ERA with 60 strikeouts across 58 innings pitched.

In 2022, Skirrow pitched for Reading in the Double-A Eastern League and the Lehigh Valley IronPigs of the Triple-A International League; he posted a cumulative 5–9 record and 4.36 ERA with 133 strikeouts in 119 2/3 innings pitched across 25 starts. Skirrow pitched for the Canada national baseball team in the 2023 World Baseball Classic. Skirrow returned to Lehigh Valley for the 2023 campaign, making 24 appearances (14 starts) and registering an 8–4 record and 5.84 ERA with 79 strikeouts and one save across 101 2/3 innings pitched.

In 2024, Skirrow made 25 appearances (17 starts) for Double-A Reading, in which he logged a 6–5 record and 4.66 ERA with 64 strikeouts across 94 2/3 innings pitched. Skirrow was released by the Phillies organization prior to the start of the following season on March 21, 2025.

=== Lancaster Stormers ===
On March 31, 2025, Skirrow signed with the Lancaster Stormers of the Atlantic League of Professional Baseball. In 25 starts for Lancaster, he compiled a 15–3 record and 3.99 ERA with 143 strikeouts across 137 2/3 innings pitched. Following the season, Skirrow was named as the Atlantic League Pitcher of the Year.

=== Toros de Tijuana ===
In April 2026, Skirrow joined the Toros de Tijuana of the Mexican League.
