= Scott Jackson (baseball) =

American baseball coach

Current position
- Title: Assistant coach/recruiting coordinator
- Team: North Carolina
- Conference: ACC

Biographical details
- Born: Winchester, Virginia, U.S.

Playing career
- 1995–1998: Campbell

Coaching career (HC unless noted)
- 2000: Wofford (assistant)
- 2001: Barton (assistant)
- 2002: Campbell (assistant)
- 2003–2007: UNC Wilmington (pitching coach)
- 2008: Liberty (pitching coach)
- 2009–2016: North Carolina (assistant coach)
- 2017–2024: Liberty
- 2025–present: North Carolina (assistant coach)

Head coaching record
- Overall: 246–181
- Tournaments: NCAA: 3–6

Accomplishments and honors

Championships
- ASUN Tournament (2019)

Awards
- ASUN Coach of the Year (2021)

Scott Jackson is an American baseball coach, who previously was the head baseball coach at Liberty University. Jackson attended college at Campbell University and played on the Campbell Fighting Camels baseball team. Jackson served as an assistant baseball coach and recruiting coordinator at the University of North Carolina at Chapel Hill from 2009 to 2016. Jackson was named head baseball coach at Liberty University on July 17, 2016. Jackson resigned on July 11, 2024 to go back to Chapel Hill as an assistant coach and recruiting coordinator at UNC.

== Head coaching record ==
Record table
Season	Team	Overall	Conference	Standing	Postseason
Liberty Flames (Big South Conference) (2017–2018)
2017	Liberty	32–23	16–8	2nd	Big South Tournament
2018	Liberty	32–26	17–10	3rd	Big South Tournament
Liberty:			33–18		
Liberty Flames (ASUN Conference) (2019–2023)
2019	Liberty	43–21	15–9	2nd	NCAA Regional
2020	Liberty	10–7			Season canceled on March 12 due to Coronavirus pandemic
2021	Liberty	41–16	19–2	1st (North)	NCAA Regional
2022	Liberty	37–23	19–11	T-1st (East)	NCAA Regional
2023	Liberty	27–31	16–14	6th	ASUN tournament
Liberty:			69–36		
Liberty Flames (Conference USA) (2024)
2024	Liberty	24–34	11–13	5th	C-USA tournament
Liberty:		246–181	11–13		
Total:		246–181			
National champion Postseason invitational champion Conference regular season champion Conference regular season and conference tournament champion Division regular season champion Division regular season and conference tournament champion Conference tournament champion
