= North Alabama Lions baseball =

Baseball team

North Alabama Lions
- 2026 North Alabama Lions baseball team
- Founded: 1932
- Overall record: 1671-1214-16
- University: University of North Alabama
- Head coach: Jad Prachniak (4th season)
- Conference: United Athletic Conference
- Location: Florence, Alabama
- Home stadium: Mike D. Lane Field at Bank Independent Stadium (capacity: TBD)
- Nickname: Lions
- Colors: Purple and gold

College World Series appearances
- Division II; 1999

NCAA regional champions
- Division II; 1999

NCAA tournament appearances
- Division II; 1984, 1985, 1987, 1989, 1991, 1992, 1993, 1995, 1997, 1999, 2011, 2012

Conference tournament champions
- Gulf South; 1984, 1989, 1993, 1997, 1999

Conference regular season champions
- ASUN; 2026 Gulf South; 1992, 1993

The North Alabama Lions baseball team represents the University of North Alabama, which is located in Florence, Alabama. The Lions are an NCAA Division I college baseball program that competes in the United Athletic Conference. They began competing in Division I in 2019 and joined the ASUN Conference the same season before moving to the UAC after the 2026 season.

The North Alabama Lions play all home games on campus at Mike D. Lane Field. Under the direction of Head Coach Jad Prachniak, the Lions are entering their 2nd season under full Division I membership. In the program's 35 years in Division II, the Lions played in 12 NCAA Tournaments and advanced to the College World Series once in 1999.

Since the program's inception in 1932, 5 Lions have gone on to play in Major League Baseball, highlighted by 3-time World Series champion and 2013 All-Star Sergio Romo. Since 1982, 15 Lions have been drafted, most recently in 2018 when the Baltimore Orioles selected Tyler Joyner in the 30th round.

== Conference membership history ==
- 1973–2018: Gulf South Conference
- 2019–2026: ASUN Conference
- 2026–present: United Athletic Conference

== Mike D. Lane Field at Bank Independent Stadium ==
Mike D. Lane Field at Bank Independent Stadium is a baseball stadium on the North Alabama campus in Florence, Alabama. It is a part of the Bank Independent Stadium complex. It is scheduled to be open for the 2025 season. It is built on the site of their previous stadium, Mike D. Lane Field, which shares the same namesake.

== Head coaches ==
Records taken from the UNA Baseball Record Book following the 2025 season. UNA began its baseball program in 1932 but records are incomplete or nonexistent for many of the early seasons. This results in incomplete records for Eddie Flowers and George Weeks.

Season	Coach	Years	Record	Pct.
1932-1949	Eddie Flowers	18	23-19-3*	.544
1950-1971	George Weeks	22	163-159*	.506
1972	Jackie Pedigo	1	10-19	.345
1973-1974	Ricky Lindsey	2	33-26	.559
1975	Mike Dean	1	12-23	.343
1976	Tommy Jones	1	15-26	.366
1977-1978	Mike Knight	2	55-65	.458
1979	Gary Elliott	1	18-17	.514
1980–1983	Mike Galloway	4	72-87	.453
1984–2008	Mike Lane	25	908–398–12	.693
2009–2018	Mike Keehn	10	308–201–1	.510
Division I Era
2019–2022	Mike Keehn	4	38–132	.224
2023–present	Jad Prachniak	4	87–131–1	.400
Totals	12 coaches	95 seasons	1742–1303–17	.572

== Program achievements ==
Gulf South Conference League Championships	1984, 1989, 1993, 1997, 1999
Gulf South Conference Division Champions	1984, 1987, 1990, 1992, 1993, 1994, 1995, 1997, 2002, 2005
NCAA Division II Regional Tournament Appearances	1984, 1985, 1987, 1989, 1991, 1992, 1993, 1995, 1997, 1999, 2011, 2012
NCAA Division II Regional Championships	1999
NCAA Division II National Championship Appearance	1999

== Lions in the Major Leagues ==
= All-Star	= Baseball Hall of Famer

Athlete	Years in MLB	MLB teams
Cedric Landrum	1991–1993	Chicago Cubs, New York Mets
Jim Czajkowski	1994	Colorado Rockies
Terry Jones	1996, 1998–2001	Colorado Rockies, Montreal Expos
Josh Willingham	2004–2014	Florida Marlins, Washington Nationals, Oakland Athletics, Minnesota Twins, Kansas City Royals
Sergio Romo	2008–2023	San Francisco Giants, Los Angeles Dodgers, Tampa Bay Rays, Miami Marlins, Minnesota Twins

Taken from the 2024 UNA Baseball Record Book. Updated February 22, 2024.

== See also ==
- List of NCAA Division I baseball programs
