= Bellarmine Knights baseball =

- 2026 Bellarmine Knights baseball team
- Founded: 1952; 74 years ago
- Conference history: Kentucky Intercollegiate Athletic Conference (1952–1964); Great Lakes Valley Conference (1980–2020)
- Overall record: 1,444–1,418–10
- University: Bellarmine University
- Head coach: Ben Reel (2nd season)
- Conference: ASUN; Gold Division
- Location: Louisville, Kentucky
- Home stadium: Knights Field
- Nickname: Knights
- Colors: Scarlet and silver

NCAA tournament appearances
- DII: 1973, 1979, 1980, 1989, 2008, 2013, 2017, 2018, 2019

Conference tournament champions
- DII: 1980, 1989, 2013, 2019

The Bellarmine Knights baseball team is the varsity intercollegiate athletic team of the Bellarmine University in Louisville, Kentucky, United States. The team competes in the National Collegiate Athletic Association's Division I and are members of the ASUN Conference.

The Knights began their transition to Division I status after many years in NCAA Division II, announcing a deal to join Division I in 2019.

== Stadiums ==
=== Knights Field ===
Knights Field is a baseball stadium in Louisville, Kentucky. It is the home stadium of the Bellarmine University Knights college baseball team since 1954.

== Head coaches ==
Year(s)	Coach	Seasons	W–L–T	Pct
1952	Luke Foppiano	1	0–6	.000
1953–1954	Ed Weber	2	15–7	.682
1955–1957	Paulie Miller	3	24–14–1	.628
1958–1959	Gene Kenny	2	18–12–1	.597
1960–1965	Alex Groza	6	33–59	.359
1966	Pat Holland	1	6–5	.375
1967–1970	Jim Connor	4	70–64	.522
1971–1974	John Deatrick	4	106–57	.650
1975–1976	Lou Snipp	2	52–56	.481
1977–1981	Al Burke	5	151–106–3	.587
1982–1985	Jack Rose	4	93–79–1	.540
1986–1991	Kevin Kocks	6	135–151–3	.472
1992–1997	Steve Kaufman	6	130–130	.500
1998–2000	Tom Malone	3	63–96–1	.397
2001–2004	Scott Wiegandt	4	65–121	.349
2005–2011	Deron Spink	7	211–184	.534
2012–2013	Matt Tyner	2	60–46	.566
2014–2022	Larry Owens	9	212–225	.485
2023–2024	Chris Dominguez	2	23–87	.209
2025–present	Ben Reel	1	0–3	.000
Totals	19	73	1,467–1,508–10	.493

== Player awards ==
=== Great Lakes Valley Conference award winners ===
- Player of the Year Award

Zac Wiley (2019)
Austin Crutcher (2015)
Patrick Brady (2008)
Scott Wiegandt (1989)

- Pitcher of the Year

Eddie Mathis (2018)
Hunter Spencer (2016)
Michael Thompson (2009)

- Freshman of the Year Award

Steve Polio (2002)

=== ASUN Conference award winners ===
- Player of the Year Award

Matt Higgins (2022)
