= Craig Gibson =

American baseball coach

Current position
- Title: Head coach
- Team: Mercer
- Conference: SoCon
- Record: 772–541

Biographical details
- Born: Macon, Georgia, U.S.
- Education: Mercer University '86

Playing career
- 1983–1986: Mercer
- Position: First base

Coaching career (HC unless noted)
- 1987–1988: Mercer (asst.)
- 1994–2003: Mercer (asst.)
- 2004–present: Mercer

Head coaching record
- Overall: 772–541
- Tournaments: NCAA: 1–8

Accomplishments and honors

Championships
- A-Sun: 2013, 2017; A-Sun Tournament: 2010; SoCon: 2015, 2016, 2017, 2026; SoCon Tournament: 2015, 2019

Awards
- A-Sun Coach of the Year (2013); Georgia Dugout Club Division I Coach of the Year (2010); 3× SoCon Coach of the Year (2015, 2017, 2026)

Craig Gibson is an American college baseball coach and former first baseman. He has been the head baseball coach at Mercer University since the start of the 2004 season. Under Gibson, Mercer has appeared in its first two NCAA tournaments. A Macon native, Gibson is a Mercer alumnus and played baseball for the Bears from 1983–1986, winning a conference player of the year award as a junior.

== Coaching career ==
After he completed his playing career and undergraduate degree at Mercer in 1986, Gibson spent the next two seasons as an assistant coach at Mercer while earning his graduate degree. He left after the 1988 season and spent the next six years as a high school coach in South Florida. He returned to Mercer as an assistant for the 1994 season.

After a ten-year stint as a Mercer assistant in the late 1990s and early 2000s, Gibson succeeded Barry Myers as the Bears' head coach for the start of the 2004 season. For his first two seasons, Link Jarrett, who would later coach against Gibson in the Southern Conference at UNC Greensboro, served as one of Gibson's assistants. The Bears made their first postseason appearance under Gibson in 2006, when they finished 3rd in the Atlantic Sun Conference (A-Sun) to qualify for the A-Sun tournament. As the second seed (second-place North Florida was ineligible), Mercer went 2–2. They defeated East Tennessee State in the opening game, then lost to Stetson, 6–5 in extra innings, in their second. In the losers bracket, the Bears knocked out top-seeded Jacksonville before being eliminated with another one-run loss to Stetson.

Mercer made three more A-Sun Tournament appearances from 2007–2009 before reaching its first NCAA tournament in 2010. At the A-Sun tournament, Gibson's team went 4–0 to win the conference's automatic bid, defeating East Tennessee State and Jacksonville two times each. Gibson said of the win, "It’s an unbelievable feeling to win here and to be going to the NCAA tournament. It’s about those 27 guys that care for each other, love each other and play hard for each other. It’s the best group I’ve had, as far as chemistry goes. I’m really proud of them." As the third seed in the Atlanta Regional, Mercer went 1–2. Georgia Tech shut them out in the opener, then defeated Elon before being eliminated by Alabama. The Bears returned to the NCAA tournament in 2013 and went 0–2 in the Starkville Regional. Gibson was named the 2013 A-Sun Coach of the Year, and Kendall Rogers of Perfect Game named him a rising college coach after the season.

Gibson's players have received many individual honors during his tenure, including major conference awards. Third baseman Chesny Young was named A-Sun Rookie of the Year in 2012 and Player of the Year in 2013. Shortstop Michael Massi was the 2014 Defensive Player of the Year. Between 2004–and 2014, 14 Mercer players were taken in the Major League Baseball draft. Cory Gearrin, taken in the fourth round in the 2007 Major League Baseball draft, played for the Atlanta Braves from 2011–2013.

== Head coaching record ==
Below is a table of Gibson's yearly records as a collegiate head baseball coach.

Record table
Season	Team	Overall	Conference	Standing	Postseason
Mercer (Atlantic Sun Conference) (2004–2015)
2004	Mercer	20–35	8–22	11th	
2005	Mercer	28–26	12–18	T-9th	
2006	Mercer	34–26	19–11	3rd	A-Sun tournament
2007	Mercer	33–25	17–10	2nd	A-Sun tournament
2008	Mercer	24–33	17–16	T-5th	A-Sun tournament
2009	Mercer	23–23	12–15	8th	A-Sun tournament
2010	Mercer	38–24	16–11	2nd	NCAA Regional
2011	Mercer	39–20	17–12	4th	A-Sun tournament
2012	Mercer	38–21	15–12	T-4th	A-Sun tournament
2013	Mercer	43–18	20–7	1st	NCAA Regional
2014	Mercer	38–17	18–9	2nd	A-Sun tournament
Mercer:			171–143		
Mercer (Southern Conference) (2015–present)
2015	Mercer	35–22	16–7	1st	NCAA Regional
2016	Mercer	38–23	16–8	1st	SoCon tournament
2017	Mercer	39–17	17–6	1st	SoCon tournament
2018	Mercer	38–22	11–13	T-5th	SoCon tournament
2019	Mercer	35–29	14–10	T-3rd	NCAA Regional
2020	Mercer	13–3	0–0		Season canceled due to COVID-19
2021	Mercer	35–22	18–9	2nd (Red)	SoCon tournament
2022	Mercer	40–18	12–9	2nd	SoCon tournament
2023	Mercer	33–25	13–8	2nd	SoCon tournament
2024	Mercer	29–29	6–14	7th	SoCon tournament
2025	Mercer	35–25	12–9	T–3rd	SoCon tournament
2026	Mercer	44–15	15–6	1st	
Mercer:		772–541	135–93		
Total:		772–541			
National champion Postseason invitational champion Conference regular season champion Conference regular season and conference tournament champion Division regular season champion Division regular season and conference tournament champion Conference tournament champion

== See also ==
- List of current NCAA Division I baseball coaches
- Mercer Bears
