= ASUN Conference baseball tournament =

American college baseball tournament

- Conference baseball championship
- Sport: Baseball
- Conference: ASUN Conference
- Number of teams: 8
- Format: Double-elimination
- Current stadium: Melching Field at Conrad Park
- Current location: DeLand, Florida
- Played: 1979–present
- Last contest: 2026
- Current champion: Lipscomb
- Most championships: Stetson (10)
- Official website: asunsports.org/sports/bsb/index

Host stadiums
- Melching Field at Conrad Park (1989, 1991, 1993, 1996–97, 2002–09, 2012–13, 2017, 2019, 2023–2026); Swanson Stadium (2014–2015, 2020, 2022); Harmon Stadium (2018, 2021); Ken Dugan Field at Stephen Lee Marsh Stadium (2010–11, 2016); Alexander Brest Field (2000–01); Osceola County Stadium (1998–99); Homestead Athletic Complex (1995); Claude Smith Field (1994); Southeastern Louisiana Diamond (1992); Centenary Park (1979, 1983–84, 1988, 1990); J. I. Clements Stadium (1985, 1987); Hunter Field (1981, 1986); SPAR Stadium (1983); Luther Williams Field (1980, 1982)

Host locations
- DeLand, FL (1989, 1991, 1993, 1996–97, 2002–09, 2012–13, 2017, 2019, 2023–2026); Fort Myers, FL (2014–2015, 2020, 2022); Jacksonville, FL (2000–01, 2018); Nashville, TN (2010–11, 2016); Fort Myers, FL (2014–2015); Kissimmee, FL (1998–99); Homestead, FL (1995); Macon, GA (1980, 1982, 1994); Hammond, LA (1992); Shreveport, LA (1979, 1983–84, 1988, 1990); Statesboro, GA (1985, 1987); Abilene, TX (1981, 1986)

The ASUN Conference baseball tournament, sometimes referred to simply as the ASUN Tournament, is the conference baseball championship of the NCAA Division I ASUN Conference. Before the ASUN expanded to 12 members in 2021 (2022 season), the top six finishers in the regular season of the conference's teams advanced to the double-elimination tournament. The winner of the tournament receives an automatic berth to the NCAA Division I Baseball Championship.

== Champions ==
=== By year ===
The following is a list of conference champions and sites listed by year.

Year	Champion	Venue	Most Valuable Player
1979	Mercer	Centenary Park • Shreveport, LA	–
1980	Georgia Southern	Luther Williams Field • Macon, GA	–
1981	Mercer	Hunter Field • Abilene, TX	–
1982	Hardin–Simmons	Luther Williams Field • Macon, GA	–
1983	Mercer	Centenary Park, SPAR Stadium • Shreveport, LA	–
1984	Nicholls State	Centenary Park • Shreveport, LA	–
1985	Georgia Southern	J. I. Clements Stadium • Statesboro, GA	Craig Cooper, Georgia Southern
1986	Georgia Southern	Hunter Field • Abilene, TX	Mike Shepherd, Georgia Southern
1987	Georgia Southern	J. I. Clements Stadium • Statesboro, GA	Brett Hendley, Georgia Southern
1988	Stetson	Centenary Park • Shreveport, LA	Mike Sempeles, Stetson
1989	Stetson	Conrad Park • DeLand, FL	Mike Pinckes, Stetson
1990	Stetson	Centenary Park • Shreveport, LA	Todd Greene, Georgia Southern
1991	FIU	Conrad Park • DeLand, FL	Kevin Lucero, FIU
1992	Southeastern Louisiana	Southeastern Louisiana Diamond • Hammond, LA	Kirk Bullinger, SLU
1993	UCF	Conrad Park • DeLand, FL	Tony Marrillia, UCF
1994	Southeastern Louisiana	Claude Smith Field • Macon, GA	Dan Newman, SLU
1995	UCF	Homestead Athletic Complex • Homestead, FL	Todd Tocco, UCF
1996	UCF	Conrad Park • DeLand, FL	Nick Presto, FAU
1997	UCF	Conrad Park • DeLand, FL	Gregg Pacitti, UCF
1998	FIU	Osceola County Stadium • Kissimmee, FL	Edwin Franco, FIU
1999	Jacksonville	Osceola County Stadium • Kissimmee, FL	Jeff Nebel, Mercer
2000	Stetson	Alexander Brest Field • Jacksonville, FL	Jeff Christy, Stetson
2001	UCF	Alexander Brest Field • Jacksonville, FL	Jeremy Kurella, UCF
2002	UCF	Melching Field at Conrad Park • DeLand, FL	Mike Myers, UCF
2003	Jacksonville	Melching Field at Conrad Park • DeLand, FL	Gordie Gronkowski, Jacksonville
2004	Florida Atlantic	Melching Field at Conrad Park • DeLand, FL	Rusty Brown, FAU
2005	Stetson	Melching Field at Conrad Park • DeLand, FL	Shane Jordan, Stetson
2006	Stetson	Melching Field at Conrad Park • DeLand, FL	Brandon Paritz, Stetson
2007	Jacksonville	Melching Field at Conrad Park • DeLand, FL	Pete Clifford, Jacksonville
2008	Lipscomb	Melching Field at Conrad Park • DeLand, FL	Caleb Joseph, Lipscomb
2009	Jacksonville	Melching Field at Conrad Park • DeLand, FL	Alex Martinez, Jacksonville
2010	Mercer	Dugan Field • Nashville, TN	Jacob Tanis, Mercer
2011	Belmont	Dugan Field • Nashville, TN	Derek Hamblen, Belmont
2012	Belmont	Melching Field at Conrad Park • DeLand, FL	Judah Akers, Belmont
2013	East Tennessee State	Melching Field at Conrad Park • DeLand, FL	Kerry Doane, ETSU
2014	Kennesaw State	Swanson Stadium • Fort Myers, FL	Brennan Morgan, KSU
2015	Lipscomb	Swanson Stadium • Fort Myers, FL	Jonathan Allison, Lipscomb
2016	Stetson	Dugan Field • Nashville, TN	Cory Reid, Stetson
2017	Florida Gulf Coast	Melching Field at Conrad Park • DeLand, FL	Marc Coffers, FGCU
2018	Stetson	Harmon Stadium • Jacksonville, FL	Eric Foggo, Stetson
2019	Liberty	Melching Field at Conrad Park • DeLand, FL	Jonathan Embry, Liberty
2020	Canceled due to the COVID-19 pandemic		
2021	Jacksonville	Division Round: Campus sites Semifinals and final: Harmon Stadium • Jacksonville, FL	Tyler Santana, Jacksonville
2022	Kennesaw State	Swanson Stadium • Fort Myers, FL	Josh Hatcher, Kennesaw State
2023	Lipscomb	Melching Field at Conrad Park • DeLand, FL	Alex Vergara, Lipscomb
2024	Stetson	Melching Field at Conrad Park • DeLand, FL	Lorenzo Meola, Stetson
2025†	Stetson; Florida Gulf Coast	Melching Field at Conrad Park • DeLand, FL	Jordan Taylor, Stetson; Jaret Nelson, FGCU
2026	Lipscomb	Melching Field at Conrad Park • DeLand, FL	Cam Pruitt, Lipscomb

notes: † FGCU and Stetson declared co-champs due to inclement weather.

=== By school ===
The following is a list of conference champions listed by school.

Program	Championships	Years
Stetson	10	1988, 1989, 1990, 2000, 2005, 2006, 2016, 2018, 2024, 2025
UCF	6	1993, 1995, 1996, 1997, 2001, 2002
Jacksonville	5	1999, 2003, 2007, 2009, 2021
Georgia Southern	4	1980, 1985, 1986, 1987
Lipscomb	4	2008, 2015, 2023, 2026
Mercer	4	1979, 1981, 1983, 2010
Kennesaw State	2	2014, 2022
Belmont	2	2011, 2012
Florida Gulf Coast	2	2017, 2025
FIU	2	1991, 1998
Southeastern Louisiana	2	1992, 1994
East Tennessee State	1	2013
Florida Atlantic	1	2004
Hardin–Simmons	1	1982
Liberty	1	2019
Nicholls State (Note: Now athletically known as Nicholls.)	1	1984

- Italics indicate that the program is no longer an ASUN member.

Of current members, Austin Peay, Bellarmine, Central Arkansas, Eastern Kentucky, North Alabama, North Florida, Queens, and West Georgia have never won an ASUN conference tournament. Austin Peay, Central Arkansas, Eastern Kentucky, North Alabama, and West Georgia plan to leave in 2026.
