= Jeff Forehand =

American baseball coach

Current position
- Title: Head coach
- Team: Lipscomb
- Conference: ASUN
- Record: 533–557

Biographical details
- Born: Nashville, Tennessee, U.S.

Playing career
- 1986–1989: Belmont
- 1997: Columbia Mules
- Position: Second baseman

Coaching career (HC unless noted)
- 1990–1992: Montgomery Bell Academy (asst)
- 1993–2000: Goodpasture Christian School
- 2001–2006: Trevecca Nazarene
- 2007–present: Lipscomb

Head coaching record
- Overall: 533–557 (NCAA); 211–142–1 (NAIA)
- Tournaments: A-SUN 20–16; NCAA: 1–9

Accomplishments and honors

Championships
- TranSouth Regular Season (2005); TranSouth Conference Tournament (2005); ASUN West Division (2022); ASUN Regular season (2023); ASUN Gold Division (2026); 4 ASUN Conference Tournament (2008, 2015, 2023, 2026)

Awards
- 2× TranSouth Coach of the Year (2004, 2005); 2× A-Sun Coach of the Year (2022, 2023)

Jeffery Forehand is an American college baseball coach and former second baseman. Forehand is the head coach of the Lipscomb Bisons baseball team.

== Early life ==
Forehand attended Belmont University, where he played for the Belmont Bruins baseball team.

== Coaching career ==
On May 5, 2005, Forehand was named the TranSouth Athletic Conference Coach of the Year for a second consecutive year.

On June 6, 2006, Forehand was named the head coach of the Lipscomb Bisons baseball program. In 2015, Forehand was named to the Trevecca Hall of Fame.

== Head coaching record ==
Record table
Season	Team	Overall	Conference	Standing	Postseason
Trevecca Nazarene Trojans (TranSouth Athletic Conference) (2001–2006)
2001	Trevecca Nazarene	15–40	3–21		
2002	Trevecca Nazarene	28–29	11–12	3rd	
2003	Trevecca Nazarene	35–20	11–10		
2004	Trevecca Nazarene	44–17–1	12–7		
2005	Trevecca Nazarene	47–16	11–4	1st	
2006	Trevecca Nazarene	42–20	13–5	2nd	NAIA Region XI
Trevecca Nazarene (NAIA):		211–142–1	61–59		
Lipscomb Bisons (Atlantic Sun Conference) (2007–present)
2007	Lipscomb	28–30	12–15	7th	Atlantic Sun tournament
2008	Lipscomb	33–30	19–14	3rd	NCAA Regional
2009	Lipscomb	24–32	17–13	4th	Atlantic Sun tournament
2010	Lipscomb	19–36	9–17	9th	
2011	Lipscomb	18–36	10–20	10th	
2012	Lipscomb	25–30	14–13	7th	
2013	Lipscomb	25–34	13–14	7th	Atlantic Sun tournament
2014	Lipscomb	33–28	17–12	4th	Atlantic Sun tournament
2015	Lipscomb	39–20	13–8	2nd	NCAA Regional
2016	Lipscomb	31–27	12–9	4th	Atlantic Sun tournament
2017	Lipscomb	28–28	9–12	6th	Atlantic Sun tournament
2018	Lipscomb	24–30	9–12	5th	Atlantic Sun tournament
2019	Lipscomb	30–25	14–10	3rd	Atlantic Sun tournament
2020	Lipscomb	11–5			Season canceled on March 12 due to Coronavirus pandemic
2021	Lipscomb	18–29	8–13	3rd (North)	ASUN tournament
2022	Lipscomb	35–23	20–10	T-1st (West)	ASUN tournament
2023	Lipscomb	36–26	23–7	1st	NCAA Regional
2024	Lipscomb	22–34	15–15	6th	ASUN tournament
2025	Lipscomb	25–30	17–13	2nd (Gold)	ASUN tournament
2026	Lipscomb	29–26	19–11	T–1st (Gold)	NCAA Regional
Lipscomb:		533–557	270–238		
Total:		533–557			
National champion Postseason invitational champion Conference regular season champion Conference regular season and conference tournament champion Division regular season champion Division regular season and conference tournament champion Conference tournament champion

== See also ==
- List of current NCAA Division I baseball coaches
