= Mike Sansing =

American former college baseball coach

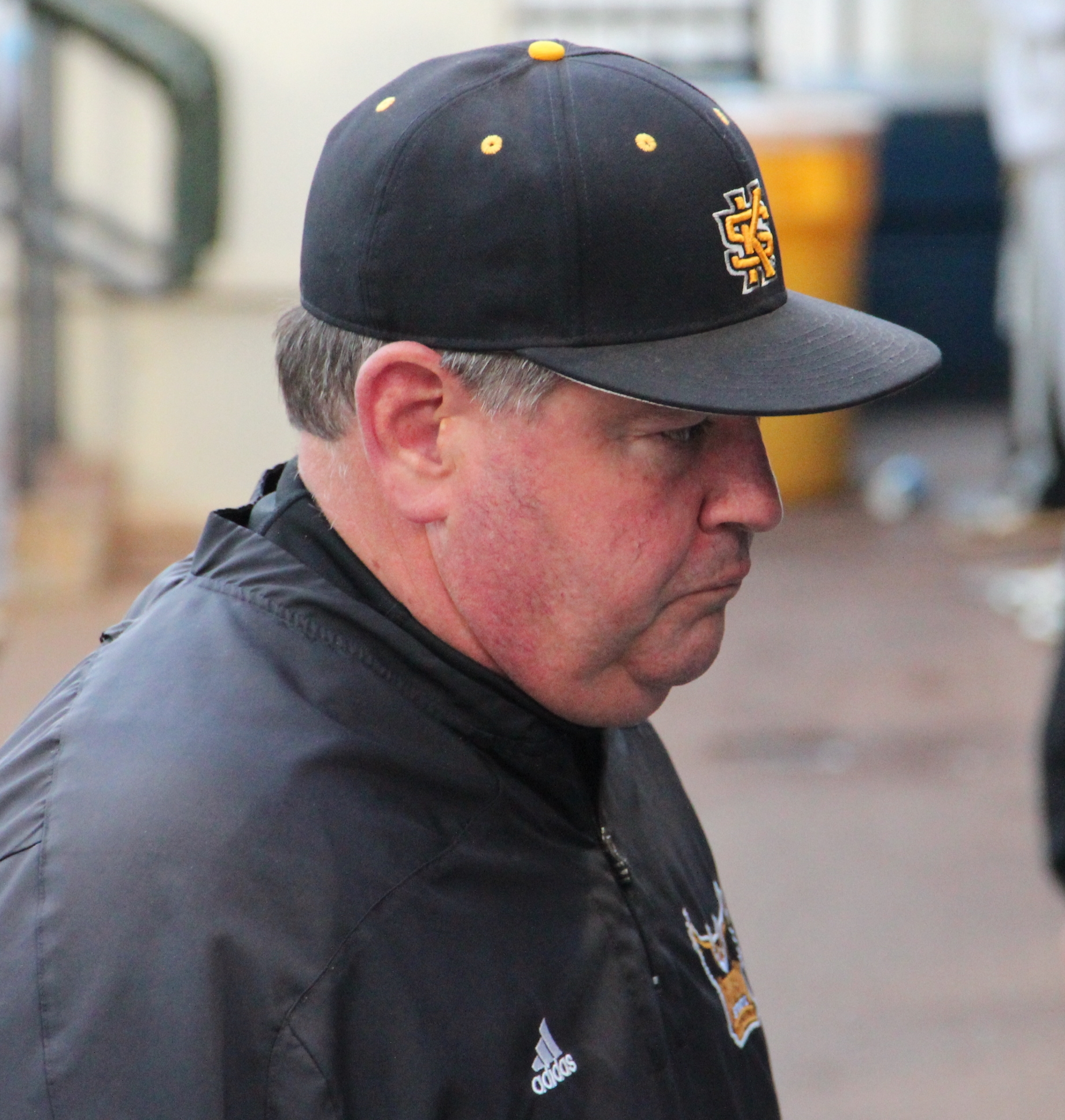
- Sansing in 2014

Playing career
- 1980–1981: Gordon
- 1982–1983: West Georgia

Coaching career (HC unless noted)
- 1985–1986: West Georgia (asst.)
- 1987–1988: Southern Poly (asst.)
- 1989–1991: Shorter (GA)
- 1992–2021: Kennesaw State

Head coaching record
- Overall: 1,163–669 (.635)
- Tournaments: NCAA D1: 3–3; A-Sun: 14–16; NCAA D2: 36–19

Accomplishments and honors

Championships
- NAIA World Series (1994)

Awards
- GIAC Coach of the Year (1990, 1991)

Mike Sansing is a former American college baseball coach, who a majority of his career served as head coach of the Kennesaw State Owls baseball team. He was named to that position prior to the 1992 season, when Kennesaw State was an NAIA team. He led the Owls as they joined the NCAA's Division II in 1994, and in 2005 began the process to elevate the program to Division I, completed for the 2010 season.

Sansing played at Gordon College and West Georgia, being named all-conference all four years, and team MVP honors three times. He began his coaching career with the Wolves in 1985. He served two seasons as an assistant, then two seasons at Southern Poly before his first head coaching position at Shorter. In his final year with the Hawks, he led the team to the 1991 conference title; he was named the conference coach of the year in both 1990 and 1991. He then moved to Kennesaw State. In his time with the Owls, he led Kennesaw State to the 1994 NAIA World Series title in their final season in the NAIA. The Owls then claimed the 1996 NCAA Division II Baseball Championship and a pair of national runner-up finishes in 1998 and 1999. Nine of his teams have won 40 or more games, including six in a row and 61 in 1998, a national record. Baseball America named Kennesaw State the "Best Division II program of the 1990s."

After moving to Division I, the Owls joined the Atlantic Sun Conference. They were not eligible for the postseason until 2010, but then made four straight A-Sun Tournaments from 2011–2014. They went 0–2 in 2011, lost in the championship game in 2012 and 2013, and won the 2014 tournament to advance to their first NCAA Division I Baseball Championship. There, they had surprising success, going 3–1 at the Tallahassee Regional to advance to the Super Regional round, where they lost to Louisville.

On May 31, 2021, Kennesaw State announced Mike Sansing's retirement.

== Head coaching record ==
Below is a table of Sansing's records as a collegiate head baseball coach.

Record table
Season	Team	Overall	Conference	Standing	Postseason
Shorter Hawks (Georgia Intercollegiate Athletic Conference – NAIA) (1989–1991)
1989	Shorter	29–22			
1990	Shorter	34–20			NAIA District 25 playoffs
1991	Shorter	39–13		1st	NAIA District 25 playoffs
Shorter:		102–55			
Kennesaw State (Georgia Intercollegiate Athletic Conference – NAIA) (1992–1994)
1992	Kennesaw State	39–19	19–9		NAIA District 25 playoffs
1993	Kennesaw State	36–16	15–13		NAIA District 25 playoffs
1994	Kennesaw State	48–14	20–8	1st	NAIA World Series
Kennesaw State (Peach Belt Conference – NCAA DII) (1995–2005)
1995	Kennesaw State	43–14	19–4	1st	NCAA Regional
1996	Kennesaw State	48–17	17–6	2nd	College World Series
1997	Kennesaw State	48–14	19–4	1st	College World Series
1998	Kennesaw State	61–5	27–1	1st	College World Series
1999	Kennesaw State	49–14	21–9	2nd	College World Series
2000	Kennesaw State	38–20	18–12	4th	NCAA tournament
2001	Kennesaw State	45–15	21–9	2nd	NCAA tournament
2002	Kennesaw State	46–13	25–5	1st	NCAA tournament
2003	Kennesaw State	40–18	18–12	4th	College World Series
2004	Kennesaw State	32–24	15–15	4th	Peach Belt Tournament
2005	Kennesaw State	37–22	19–11	2nd	NCAA tournament
Kennesaw State (Atlantic Sun Conference – NCAA DI) (2006–2021)
2006	Kennesaw State	24–32	12–18	T-8th	
2007	Kennesaw State	32–23	13–14	T-5th	
2008	Kennesaw State	30–26	21–12	2nd	
2009	Kennesaw State	30–22	20–9	2nd	
2010	Kennesaw State	23–32	12–15	8th	
2011	Kennesaw State	32–25	18–11	3rd	A-Sun tournament
2012	Kennesaw State	34–25	15–11	3rd	A-Sun tournament
2013	Kennesaw State	30–30	13–14	T-6th	A-Sun tournament
2014	Kennesaw State	40–24	17–9	3rd	NCAA Super Regional
2015	Kennesaw State	28–28	10–10	6th	A-Sun tournament
2016	Kennesaw State	29–27	17–4	1st	A-Sun tournament
2017	Kennesaw State	25–32	10–11	5th	A-Sun tournament
2018	Kennesaw State	25–30	11–10	3rd	A-Sun tournament
2019	Kennesaw State	27–29	11–13	7th	
2020	Kennesaw State	10–8			Remainder of season canceled due to the COVID-19 pandemic
2021	Kennesaw State	29–22	13–8	2nd (North)	ASUN tournament
Kennesaw State:		1,061–641	486–287		
Total:		1,163–669			
National champion Postseason invitational champion Conference regular season champion Conference regular season and conference tournament champion Division regular season champion Division regular season and conference tournament champion Conference tournament champion

== See also ==
- List of college baseball career coaching wins leaders
