= 2012 Atlantic Sun Conference baseball tournament =

American college baseball tournament

- Teams: 6
- Format: Double-elimination
- Finals site: Melching Field at Conrad Park; DeLand, FL
- Champions: Belmont (2nd title)
- Winning coach: Dave Jarvis (2nd title)
- MVP: Judah Akers (Belmont)

2012 Atlantic Sun Conference baseball standings
| | Conf. | | | | Overall |
| Team | W | | L | PCT | W | | L | PCT |
|---|---|---|---|---|---|---|---|---|
| Belmont ‍†‍‡‍^{y} | 17 | – | 10 | .630 | 39 | – | 24 | .619 |
| South Carolina Upstate ‍‍‍ | 16 | – | 10 | .615 | 33 | – | 20 | .623 |
| Kennesaw State ‍‍‍ | 15 | – | 11 | .577 | 34 | – | 25 | .576 |
| Mercer ‍‍‍ | 15 | – | 12 | .556 | 38 | – | 21 | .644 |
| Stetson ‍‍‍ | 15 | – | 12 | .556 | 35 | – | 23 | .603 |
| Florida Gulf Coast ‍‍‍ | 15 | – | 12 | .556 | 26 | – | 31 | .456 |
| Lipscomb ‍‍‍ | 14 | – | 13 | .519 | 25 | – | 30 | .455 |
| North Florida ‍‍‍ | 12 | – | 15 | .444 | 31 | – | 24 | .564 |
| East Tennessee State ‍‍‍ | 8 | – | 19 | .296 | 23 | – | 32 | .418 |
| Jacksonville ‍‍‍ | 7 | – | 20 | .259 | 18 | – | 38 | .321 |
† – Conference champion ‡ – Tournament champion y – Invited to the NCAA tournament As of June 30, 2012; Rankings from Collegiate Baseball

The 2012 Atlantic Sun Conference baseball tournament was held at Melching Field at Conrad Park on the campus of Stetson University in DeLand, Florida, from May 23 through 26. Belmont won their second consecutive and second overall championship with a 10–4 championship game victory over Kennesaw State. The Bruins joined the Ohio Valley Conference beginning with the 2013 season. Belmont earned the Atlantic Sun Conference's automatic bid to the 2012 NCAA Division I baseball tournament.

== Format and seeding ==
The 2012 tournament was a 6-team double-elimination tournament. The top six teams (based on conference results) from the conference earned invites to the tournament.

| Team | W | L | PCT | GB | Seed |
|---|---|---|---|---|---|
| Belmont | 17 | 11 | .630 | – | 1 |
| South Carolina Upstate | 16 | 10 | .615 | .5 | 2 |
| Kennesaw State | 15 | 11 | .577 | 1.5 | 3 |
| Florida Gulf Coast | 15 | 12 | .556 | 2 | 4 |
| Mercer | 15 | 12 | .556 | 2 | 5 |
| Stetson | 15 | 12 | .556 | 2 | 6 |
| Lipscomb | 14 | 13 | .519 | 3 | – |
| North Florida | 12 | 15 | .444 | 5 | – |
| East Tennessee State | 8 | 19 | .296 | 9 | – |
| Jacksonville | 7 | 20 | .259 | 10 | – |

== Bracket and results ==
First round
6 | Stetson | 3
1 | Belmont | 4
4 | Florida Gulf Coast | 12
3 | Kennesaw State | 4
5 | Mercer | 11
2 | USC Upstate | 2

Second round
1 | Belmont | 1
3 | Kennesaw State | 3
2 | USC Upstate | 0
6 | Stetson | 1
4 | Florida Gulf Coast | 4
5 | Mercer | 3
1 | Belmont | 10
3 | Mercer | 3

Third round
3 | Kennesaw State | 5
6 | Stetson | 4
4 | Florida Gulf Coast | 4
1 | Belmont | 6

Semifinals
4 | Florida Gulf Coast | 4
3 | Kennesaw State | 13

Final
3 | Kennesaw State | 4
1 | Belmont | 10

== All-Tournament Team ==
The following players were named to the All-Tournament Team.

| Pos. | Name | School |
|---|---|---|
| SP | Will Dorsey | Stetson |
| SP | Jason Forjet | Florida Gulf Coast |
| C | Ronnie Freeman | Kennesaw State |
| 1B | Sean Dwyer | Florida Gulf Coast |
| 1B | Judah Akers | Belmont |
| 2B | Zac Mitchell | Belmont |
| SS | Brandon Bednar | Florida Gulf Coast |
| OF | Ryan Gebhart | Florida Gulf Coast |
| OF | Aaron Dobbs | Kennesaw State |
| OF | Drew Turner | Belmont |
| DH | Andy Chriscaden | Kennesaw State |

=== Most Valuable Player ===
Judah Akers was named Tournament MVP. Akers was a first baseman for Belmont.
