= Rusty Stroupe =

American baseball player & coach

Biographical details
- Born: Cherryville, North Carolina, U.S.

Playing career
- 1983–1986: Appalachian State
- Position: Shortstop

Coaching career (HC unless noted)
- 1990: Appalachian State (asst)
- 1991–1992: North Greenville College
- 1993–1997: Brevard College
- 1998–2002: Lander
- 2003–2019: Gardner–Webb

Head coaching record
- Overall: 837–678–2
- Tournaments: A-SUN: 4–4; Big South: 11–16; NCAA: 0–0

Accomplishments and honors

Awards
- Big South Coach of the Year (2019); Most wins by any coach in Gardner-Webb history

Rusty Stroupe is an American college baseball coach and former shortstop. Stroupe was the head coach of the Gardner–Webb Runnin' Bulldogs baseball team from 2003 to 2019.

== Playing career ==
Stroupe played shortstop at Cherryville High School where he was part of three state championship teams, and earned a scholarship to play at Appalachian State University for the Mountaineers baseball program from 1983 to 1986.

== Coaching career ==
After taking a teaching position after college graduation, Stroupe began to coach middle school baseball. In 1990, Stroupe was an assistant coach at Appalachian State. Stroupe took his first head coaching position at North Greenville College in 1991. In 1993, Stroupe became the head coach at Brevard College. From 1998 to 2002, Stroupe was the head coach at Lander University, where he started the baseball program.

In the summer of 2002, Stroupe to the head coaching position at Gardner–Webb. On April 17, 2019, Stroupe announced that he would be retiring at the end of the 2019 season. Stroupe is the all-time wins leader in Gardner-Webb baseball history.

Stroupe was named the Big South Conference Coach of the Year in 2019.

In 2012, Stroupe received the prestigious FCA Jerry Kindall Character in Coaching Award (presented annually to the college or high school baseball coach in the United States who best exemplifies the Christian principles of Character, Integrity, Excellence, Teamwork and Service on and off the baseball field).

After retiring from coaching, Stroupe became a college professor, an ordained pastor, and a baseball color analyst for ESPN Plus.

== Head coaching record at Gardner-Webb ==
Record table
Season	Team	Overall	Conference	Standing	Postseason
Gardner–Webb Runnin' Bulldogs (Atlantic Sun Conference) (2003–2008)
2003	Gardner–Webb	33–23	18–15		A-SUN Tournament
2004	Gardner–Webb	32–25	19-11		A-Sun Tournament
2005	Gardner–Webb	28–30	15–15	5th	A-SUN Tournament
2006	Gardner–Webb	24–31	12–18	8th	
2007	Gardner–Webb	26–32	12–15	7th	A-SUN Tournament
2008	Gardner–Webb	29–30	15–18	8th	A-SUN Tournament
Gardner–Webb Runnin' Bulldogs (Big South Conference) (2009–2019)
2009	Gardner–Webb	25–25	13–14	5th	Big South Tournament
2010	Gardner–Webb	25–30	12–15	8th	Big South Tournament
2011	Gardner–Webb	34-23	14–13	5th	Big South Tournament
2012	Gardner–Webb	32–28	14–10	4th	Big South Tournament
2013	Gardner–Webb	29–27	12-11	2nd (South)	Big South Tournament
2014	Gardner–Webb	24–31	11–15	4th (South)	Big South Tournament
2015	Gardner–Webb	22–31	7–17	9th	
2016	Gardner–Webb	37–21	14–10	T-2nd	Big South Tournament
2017	Gardner–Webb	25–30	11–13	7th	Big South Tournament
2018	Gardner–Webb	31–27	14–13	5th	Big South Tournament
2019	Gardner–Webb	25–26	14–13	T-5th	Big South Tournament
Gardner–Webb:		481–470	236–143		
Total:		837–678–2			
National champion Postseason invitational champion Conference regular season champion Conference regular season and conference tournament champion Division regular season champion Division regular season and conference tournament champion Conference tournament champion
