= Tony Skole =

American baseball coach (born 1968)

Current position
- Title: General Manager
- Team: Coastal Carolina
- Conference: Sun Belt Conference

Biographical details
- Born: September 26, 1968 (age 58)

Playing career

Baseball
- 1989–1992: The Citadel

Football
- 1988–1990: The Citadel

Coaching career (HC unless noted)
- 1993–1996: Lincoln Memorial (Asst.)
- 1997–1999: Lincoln Memorial
- 2000–2017: East Tennessee State
- 2018–2024: The Citadel
- 2024-2026: IMG Academy
- 2027-present: Coastal Carolina (GM)

Head coaching record
- Overall: 689–810–1
- Tournaments: SoCon 6–18; ASUN: 10–9; NCAA: 0–2

Accomplishments and honors

Championships
- ASUN Tournament (2013)

Tony Skole (born September 26, 1968) is an American baseball coach and former third baseman, who is the former head baseball coach of The Citadel Bulldogs. He played college baseball and college football at The Citadel from 1988 to 1992. He previously served as head coach of the East Tennessee State Buccaneers (2000–2017).

== Playing career ==
Skole played baseball and football at The Citadel Bulldogs, a key part of several memorable teams in both sports. In baseball, he was part of the team that reached the 1990 College World Series and drove in the go-ahead run against Cal State Fullerton in the Bulldogs only win in Omaha. He played for both Chal Port and Fred Jordan, whom he succeeded as head coach of the Bulldogs in 2017. He was a starting Defensive Back on football teams that beat the University of South Carolina, the University of Arkansas and the United States Military Academy; the Bulldogs reached the Division I-AA playoffs twice, for the first time in school history.

== Coaching career ==
On June 8, 2017, he was named the head baseball coach of The Citadel Bulldogs.

== Head coaching record ==
Record table
Season	Team	Overall	Conference	Standing	Postseason
Lincoln Memorial Railsplitters (South Atlantic Conference) (1997–1999)
1997	Lincoln Memorial	32–19–1	7–14		
1998	Lincoln Memorial	29–20	9–11		
1999	Lincoln Memorial	34–19	12–9		
Lincoln Memorial:		95–58–1	28–34		
East Tennessee State Buccaneers (Southern Conference) (2000–2005)
2000	East Tennessee State	21–31	15–15	5th	Southern tournament
2001	East Tennessee State	23–32	13–17	7th	Southern tournament
2002	East Tennessee State	21–36	13–16	T-8th	
2003	East Tennessee State	15–36	9–20	9th	
2004	East Tennessee State	28–30	15–15	6th	Southern tournament
2005	East Tennessee State	31–22	13–16	7th	Southern tournament
:		SoCon	106–143		
East Tennessee State Buccaneers (Atlantic Sun Conference) (2006–2014)
2006	East Tennessee State	31–27	14–16	T-5th	ASUN tournament
2007	East Tennessee State	26–29	11–16	9th	
2008	East Tennessee State	18–36	9–24	12th	
2009	East Tennessee State	25–28	10–20	9th	ASUN tournament
2010	East Tennessee State	32–28	15–12	3rd	ASUN tournament
2011	East Tennessee State	36–21	16–12	5th	ASUN tournament
2012	East Tennessee State	23–32	8–19	9th	
2013	East Tennessee State	36–24	17–10	4th	NCAA Regional
2014	East Tennessee State	27–30	13–13	T-5th	ASUN tournament
:		A-Sun	113–142		
East Tennessee State Buccaneers (Southern Conference) (2015–2017)
2015	East Tennessee State	21–35	8–16	9th	Southern tournament
2016	East Tennessee State	27–30	11–13	5th	Southern tournament
2017	East Tennessee State	30–29	9–15	7th	Southern tournament
East Tennessee State:		471–536	106–143		
The Citadel Bulldogs (Southern Conference) (2018–2024)
2018	The Citadel	19–34	8–16	8th	Southern tournament
2019	The Citadel	12–43	5–19	9th	Southern tournament
2020	The Citadel	10–6	0–0		Season canceled due to COVID-19
2021	The Citadel	12–39	4–25	4th (Red)	
2022	The Citadel	26–31	5–16	8th	
2023	The Citadel	23–31	7–14	8th	Southern tournament
2024	The Citadel	21–32	3–18	8th	Southern tournament
The Citadel:		123–216	32–108		
Total:		689–810–1			
National champion Postseason invitational champion Conference regular season champion Conference regular season and conference tournament champion Division regular season champion Division regular season and conference tournament champion Conference tournament champion

== See also ==
- List of current NCAA Division I baseball coaches
