= Tim Montez =

American baseball coach (born 1961)

Current position
- Title: Head coach
- Team: Ottawa Spirit

Biographical details
- Born: February 11, 1961 (age 65); Whittier, California, U.S.

Playing career
- 1981–1984: Pepperdine
- Position: Pitcher

Coaching career (HC unless noted)
- 1989–1990: Pepperdine (assistant)
- 1991–1993: Montclair Prep (assistant)
- 1994–1996: UC Santa Barbara (assistant)
- 1997: Cal State Northridge (assistant)
- 1998–2002: Arkansas (assistant)
- 2003–2005: Fresno State (assistant)
- 2006–2013: Jacksonville (assistant)
- 2014–2016: Jacksonville
- 2017–present: Ottawa University Arizona

Head coaching record
- Overall: 104–106 / 39–29
- Tournaments: A-Sun: 1–4

Accomplishments and honors

Awards
- 2× NCCAA West Region Coach of the Year (2018, 2021); GSAC Coach of the Year (2021)

Tim Montez (born February 11, 1961) is an American college baseball coach, formerly serving as head coach of the Jacksonville Dolphins baseball team. He assumed this position prior to the 2014 season.

== Early life ==
Montez was a four-year letterwinner as a pitcher at Pepperdine, where he compiled a 19–11 record with three saves. He led the Waves to the Southern California Baseball Association title in his senior season, and earned All-Conference honors. He was a first round pick by the Mexico City Reds and played two seasons before returning to the United States. While redshirting at Pepperdine, Montez coached at Esperanza High School, leading them to a playoff appearance and a 1.86 ERA.

== Career ==
Montez was first hired by Pepperdine's Andy Lopez as a pitching coach, where he remained for two seasons. He returned to the high school ranks, assisting Montclair College Preparatory School for three seasons, including the 1991 California state championship season. Montez then spent three seasons as pitching coach at UC Santa Barbara followed by one season as pitching coach and recruiting coordinator at Cal State Northridge. Next, he served for five seasons at Arkansas, where he served as recruiting coordinator and helped the Razorbacks to their first SEC titles and a super regional appearance. Montez spent three seasons as pitching coach and recruiting coordinator where he helped assemble three consecutive top 15 recruiting classes on the West Coast at Fresno State before moving to Jacksonville for his first collegiate head coaching position. At Jacksonville, Montez was part of 4 NCAA Regionals and 3 Conference Championships. Overall, Montez has coached in nine NCAA Regionals and one Super Regional. Montez has coached several first-round draft picks and numerous MLB players such as Russ Ortiz, Michael Young, Cliff Lee, Matt Garza, and Doug Fister. Montez is known for saying "ikik" to get his players' attention.

Montez's contract with Jacksonville expired at the end of the 2016 season and, despite moderate success in his three years as head coach, the university chose not to renew his contract.

In early 2017, shortly before the beginning of the 2017 season, the Ottawa Spirit, the baseball team representing Ottawa University's campus in Arizona, hired Montez as the school's first head baseball coach.

== Head coaching record ==
The following is a table of Montez's yearly records as a college baseball head coach.

Record table
Season	Team	Overall	Conference	Standing	Postseason
Jacksonville Dolphins (Atlantic Sun Conference) (2014–2017)
2014	Jacksonville	21–33	13–13	t-5th	A-Sun Tournament
2015	Jacksonville	26–30	12–9	4th	A-Sun Tournament
2016	Jacksonville	33–22	14-7	3rd	A-Sun Tournament
Jacksonville:		80–85 (.485)	39–29 (.574)		
Ottawa Spirit (National Christian College Athletic Association) (2018–2018)
2018	Ottawa	24–24	–		NCCAA Baseball World Series
Ottawa Spirit (Golden State Athletic Conference) (2019–present)
2019	Ottawa	9–42	4–28		
2020	Ottawa	8–15	5–8		
2021	Ottawa	16–28	5–11		GSAC Championship Series
2022	Ottawa	21–29	12–19		
2023	Ottawa	14–29–1	6–17–1		
2024	Ottawa	35–19	10–14		NAIA baseball tournament
2025	Ottawa	31–20	14–10		GSAC Baseball Tournament
Ottawa:		158–206–1 (.434)	56–107–1 (.345)		
Total:		238–291–1 (.450)			
National champion Postseason invitational champion Conference regular season champion Conference regular season and conference tournament champion Division regular season champion Division regular season and conference tournament champion Conference tournament champion

== See also ==
- List of current NCAA Division I baseball coaches
