= 2008 Atlantic Sun Conference baseball tournament =

American college baseball tournament

- Teams: 6
- Format: Double-elimination
- Finals site: Melching Field at Conrad Park; DeLand, FL
- Champions: Lipscomb (1st title)
- Winning coach: Jeff Forehand (1st title)
- MVP: Caleb Joseph (Lipscomb)

2008 Atlantic Sun Conference baseball standings
	Conf.				Overall
Team	W		L	PCT	W		L	PCT
Florida Gulf Coast ‍†‍‍	25	–	8	.758	38	–	15	.717
Kennesaw State ‍‍‍	22	–	12	.647	30	–	26	.536
Lipscomb ‍‍‡‍^{y}	19	–	14	.576	33	–	30	.524
North Florida ‍‍‍	18	–	15	.545	29	–	26	.527
South Carolina Upstate ‍‍‍	17	–	16	.515	25	–	29	.463
Mercer ‍‍‍	17	–	16	.515	24	–	33	.421
Belmont ‍‍‍	16	–	17	.485	25	–	33	.431
Gardner–Webb ‍‍‍	15	–	18	.455	29	–	30	.492
Stetson ‍‍‍	15	–	18	.455	26	–	33	.441
Jacksonville ‍‍‍	13	–	20	.394	27	–	29	.482
Campbell ‍‍‍	13	–	20	.394	21	–	37	.362
East Tennessee State ‍‍‍	9	–	24	.273	18	–	38	.321
† – Conference champion ‡ – Tournament champion y – Invited to the NCAA tournament As of June 30, 2008; Rankings from Collegiate Baseball

The 2008 Atlantic Sun Conference baseball tournament was held at Melching Field at Conrad Park on the campus of Stetson University in DeLand, Florida, from May 21 through 25. Lipscomb won its first tournament championship to earn the Atlantic Sun Conference's automatic bid to the 2008 NCAA Division I baseball tournament. Lipscomb joined the conference prior to the 2004 season.

== Seeding ==
The top six teams (based on conference results) from the conference earn invites to the tournament. Florida Gulf Coast, Kennesaw State, North Florida, and South Carolina Upstate were ineligible for the tournament due to NCAA rules after reclassifying to Division I.

Team	W	L	PCT	GB	Seed
Florida Gulf Coast	25	8	.758	–	–
Kennesaw State	21	12	.636	4	–
Lipscomb	19	14	.576	6	1
North Florida	18	15	.545	7	–
South Carolina Upstate	17	16	.515	8	–
Mercer	17	16	.515	8	2
Belmont	16	17	.485	9	3
Gardner–Webb	15	18	.455	10	4
Stetson	15	18	.455	10	5
Campbell	13	20	.395	12	6
Jacksonville	13	20	.395	12	–
East Tennessee State	9	24	.273	16	–

== Results ==
First round
1	Lipscomb	14
6	Campbell	0
3	Belmont	7*
4	Gardner–Webb	9*
2	Mercer	5
5	Stetson	8

Second round
1	Lipscomb	8
3	Belmont	9
6	Campbell	11
2	Mercer	3
4	Gardner–Webb	10
5	Stetson	6
1	Lipscomb	12
5	Stetson	4

Third round
3	Belmont	6
6	Campbell	3
2	Gardner–Webb	2
1	Lipscomb	8

Semifinals
3	Belmont	3
4	Gardner–Webb	6

Final
4	Gardner–Webb	9†
1	Lipscomb	10†

* - Indicates game required 10 innings. † - Indicates game required 15 innings.

== All-Tournament Team ==
The following players were named to the All-Tournament Team.

Pos	Name	Team
P	Rex Brothers	Lipscomb
P	Chris Burnett	Lipscomb
C	Caleb Joseph	Lipscomb
IF	Derek Wiley	Belmont
IF	Casey Frawley	Stetson
IF	Branden Cadavid	Lipscomb
IF	Ben Williams	Lipscomb
OF	Daniel Cooke	Gardner–Webb
OF	Jamall Kinard	Gardner–Webb
OF	Allen Bolden	Lipscomb
OF	Shane Simpkins	Lipscomb

=== Tournament Most Valuable Player ===
Caleb Joseph was named Tournament Most Valuable Player. Joseph was a catcher for Lipscomb.
