= 2003 Atlantic Sun Conference baseball tournament =

American college baseball tournament

- Teams: 6
- Format: Double-elimination
- Finals site: Melching Field at Conrad Park; DeLand, FL
- Champions: Jacksonville (2nd title)
- Winning coach: Terry Alexander (2nd title)
- MVP: Gordie Gronkowski (Jacksonville)

2003 Atlantic Sun Conference baseball standings
	Conf.				Overall
Team	W		L	PCT	W		L	PCT
No. 23 Florida Atlantic ‍†‍‍^{y}	25	–	8	.758	41	–	16	.719
Stetson ‍‍‍^{y}	21	–	12	.636	41	–	24	.631
Jacksonville State ‍‍‍	19	–	14	.576	32	–	26	.552
Belmont ‍‍‍	19	–	14	.576	29	–	23	.558
Gardner–Webb ‍‍‍	18	–	15	.545	33	–	23	.589
Jacksonville ‍‍‡‍^{y}	17	–	16	.515	32	–	30	.516
Troy ‍‍‍	16	–	17	.485	27	–	27	.500
Georgia State ‍‍‍	16	–	17	.485	25	–	29	.463
UCF ‍‍‍	14	–	16	.467	31	–	25	.554
Campbell ‍‍‍	14	–	19	.424	22	–	28	.440
Samford ‍‍‍	7	–	23	.233	17	–	34	.333
Mercer ‍‍‍	6	–	21	.222	11	–	34	.244
† – Conference champion ‡ – Tournament champion y – Invited to the NCAA tournament As of June 30, 2003; Rankings from Collegiate Baseball

The 2003 Atlantic Sun Conference baseball tournament was held at Melching Field at Conrad Park on the campus of Stetson University in DeLand, Florida, from May 26 through 29. Jacksonville won its second tournament championship to earn the Atlantic Sun Conference's automatic bid to the 2003 NCAA Division I baseball tournament.

== Seeding ==
The top six teams (based on conference results) from the conference earn invites to the tournament.

Team	W	L	PCT	GB	Seed
Florida Atlantic	25	8	.758	—	1
Stetson	21	12	.636	4	2
Jacksonville State	19	14	.576	6	3
Belmont	19	14	.576	6	4
Gardner–Webb	18	15	.545	7	5
Jacksonville	17	16	.515	8	6
Troy	16	17	.485	9	—
Georgia State	16	17	.485	9	—
UCF	14	16	.467	9.5	—
Campbell	14	19	.424	11	—
Samford	7	23	.233	16.5	—
Mercer	6	21	.222	16	—

== Results ==
First round
1	Florida Atlantic	3
6	Jacksonville	4
3	Jacksonville State	4
4	Belmont	11
2	Stetson	3
5	Gardner–Webb	1

Second round
6	Jacksonville	6
3	Jacksonville State	10
1	Florida Atlantic	5
5	Gardner–Webb	4
4	Belmont	3
2	Stetson	9
6	Jacksonville	15
4	Belmont	7

Third round
3	Jacksonville State	2
1	Florida Atlantic	3
2	Stetson	6
6	Jacksonville	9

Semifinals
1	Florida Atlantic	1
2	Stetson	8

Final
2	Stetson	1
6	Jacksonville	7

== All-Tournament Team ==
The following players were named to the All-Tournament Team.

Pos	Name	Team
P	Adam Blair	Stetson
P	Clint Hart	Jacksonville
P	Dennis Robinson	Jacksonville
C	Jason Warpool	Belmont
IF	Rusty Beale	Stetson
IF	Gordie Gronkowski	Jacksonville
IF	Bobby Hicks	Jacksonville State
IF	Brian Snyder	Stetson
OF	Jeff Fiorentino	Florida Atlantic
OF	Chad Hauseman	Jacksonville
OF	Chris Kelly	Jacksonville

=== Tournament Most Valuable Player ===
Gordie Gronkowski was named Tournament Most Valuable Player. Gronkowski was an infielder for Jacksonville.
