= 2006 Atlantic Sun Conference baseball tournament =

American college baseball tournament

- Teams: 6
- Format: Double-elimination
- Finals site: Melching Field at Conrad Park; DeLand, FL
- Champions: Stetson (6th title)
- Winning coach: Pete Dunn (6th title)
- MVP: Brandon Paritz (Stetson)

2006 Atlantic Sun Conference baseball standings
	Conf.				Overall
Team	W		L	PCT	W		L	PCT
Jacksonville ‍†‍‍^{y}	23	–	7	.767	43	–	19	.694
North Florida ‍‍‍	20	–	10	.667	34	–	21	.618
Mercer ‍‍‍	19	–	11	.633	34	–	26	.567
Stetson ‍‍‡‍^{y}	16	–	14	.533	38	–	24	.613
East Tennessee State ‍‍‍	14	–	16	.467	31	–	27	.534
Florida Atlantic ‍‍‍	14	–	16	.467	30	–	28	.517
Campbell ‍‍‍	13	–	17	.433	19	–	38	.333
Gardner–Webb ‍‍‍	12	–	18	.400	24	–	31	.436
Kennesaw State ‍‍‍	12	–	18	.400	24	–	32	.429
Belmont ‍‍‍	11	–	19	.367	24	–	31	.436
Lipscomb ‍‍‍	11	–	19	.367	22	–	32	.407
† – Conference champion ‡ – Tournament champion y – Invited to the NCAA tournament As of June 30, 2006; Rankings from Collegiate Baseball

The 2006 Atlantic Sun Conference baseball tournament was held at Melching Field at Conrad Park on the campus of Stetson University in DeLand, Florida, from May 25 through 27. Stetson won its sixth tournament championship, and second in a row, to earn the Atlantic Sun Conference's automatic bid to the 2006 NCAA Division I baseball tournament.

== Seeding ==
The top six teams (based on conference results) from the conference earn invites to the tournament. Kennesaw State and North Florida were ineligible for the tournament due to NCAA rules after reclassifying to Division I.

Team	W	L	PCT	GB	Seed
Jacksonville	23	7	.767	–	1
North Florida	20	10	.667	3	–
Mercer	19	11	.633	4	2
Stetson	16	14	.533	7	3
Florida Atlantic	14	16	.467	9	4
East Tennessee State	14	16	.467	9	5
Campbell	13	17	.433	10	6
Gardner–Webb	12	18	.400	11	–
Kennesaw State	12	18	.400	11	–
Belmont	11	19	.367	12	–
Lipscomb	11	19	.367	12	–

== Results ==
First round
1	Jacksonville	6
6	Campbell	5
3	Stetson	3
4	Florida Atlantic	2
2	Mercer	11
5	East Tennessee State	3

Second round
1	Jacksonville	3
4	Florida Atlantic	8
6	Campbell	10
5	East Tennessee State	11
3	Stetson	6
2	Mercer	5*
1	Jacksonville	6
2	Mercer	7

Third round
4	Florida Atlantic	1
5	East Tennessee State	5
3	Stetson	5
2	Mercer	4

Final
5	East Tennessee State	2	—
3	Stetson	6	—

* - Indicates game required 11 innings.

== All-Tournament Team ==
The following players were named to the All-Tournament Team.

Pos	Name	Team
P	Robbie Elsemiller	Stetson
P	Caleb Glafenhein	East Tennessee State
C	Josh Thompson	Mercer
IF	Anthony Russell	East Tennessee State
IF	Chuck Hargis	East Tennessee State
IF	Chris Johnson	Stetson
IF	Brandon Paritz	Stetson
OF	Shane Jordan	Stetson
OF	C. J. Lee	East Tennessee State
OF	Mike McCallister	Jacksonville
At-Large	Will Romanowicz	Stetson

=== Tournament Most Valuable Player ===
Brandon Paritz was named Tournament Most Valuable Player. Paritz was an infielder for Stetson.
