= 2025 ASUN Conference baseball tournament =

American college baseball tournament

- Teams: 8
- Format: Double-elimination
- Finals site: Melching Field at Conrad Park; DeLand, Florida
- Champions: Stetson (10th title); Florida Gulf Coast (2nd title)
- Winning coach: Steve Trimper (3rd title); Dave Tollett (2nd title)
- MVP: Jordan Taylor (Stetson); Jaret Nelson (FGCU) ()
- Television: ESPN+

2025 ASUN Conference baseball standings
	Conf.						Overall
Team	W		L		T	PCT	W		L		T	PCT
Gold
Austin Peay ^{x}‍‍‍	26	–	4	–	0	.867	45	–	14	–	0	.763
Lipscomb ‍‍‍	17	–	13	–	0	.567	25	–	30	–	0	.455
North Alabama ‍‍‍	16	–	14	–	0	.533	24	–	31	–	0	.436
Central Arkansas ‍‍‍	12	–	18	–	0	.400	20	–	35	–	0	.364
Bellarmine ‍‍‍	11	–	19	–	0	.367	17	–	38	–	0	.309
Eastern Kentucky ‍‍‍	8	–	22	–	0	.267	11	–	44	–	0	.200
Graphite
Stetson ^{x}‍‍‡‍^{y}	24	–	6	–	0	.800	41	–	22	–	0	.651
Jacksonville ‍‍‍	17	–	13	–	0	.567	30	–	26	–	0	.536
Florida Gulf Coast ‍‍‡‍	16	–	14	–	0	.533	31	–	29	–	0	.517
North Florida ‍‍‍	15	–	15	–	0	.500	27	–	29	–	0	.482
West Georgia* ‍‍‍	11	–	19	–	0	.367	20	–	31	–	0	.392
Queens* ‍‍‍	7	–	23	–	0	.233	9	–	44	–	0	.170
x – Division champion ‡ – Tournament champion y – Invited to the NCAA tournament * Ineligible for the 2025 NCAA tournament due to transition from Division II; As of June 1, 2025; Rankings from D1Baseball

The 2025 Atlantic Sun Conference baseball tournament was held from May 20 through 25 at Melching Field at Conrad Park in DeLand, Florida. The top four regular season finishers from each division (eight out of twelve total teams) will meet in the tournament. This is the same format that has been used since 2023.

Florida Gulf Coast defeated Stetson 6–5 in the first championship game in 6 innings due to inclement weather. The winner-take-all championship game was cancelled and Florida Gulf Coast and Stetson were declared co-champions of the tournament. Per conference policy, Stetson received the ASUN berth in the 2025 NCAA Division I baseball tournament. Jordan Taylor of Stetson and Jaret Nelson of FGCU were named co-tournament MVP.

== Seeding and format ==
The top four finishers from each six-team division qualify for the tournament. Teams are seeded based on conference winning percentage, followed by division winning percentage, with the first tiebreaker being head-to-head record.

== Bracket ==
Upper round 1	Upper round 2	Upper final	Final
GR2	Jacksonville	5
GO3	North Alabama	1
GR2	Jacksonville	1
GO1	Austin Peay	9
GO1	Austin Peay	10
GR4	North Florida	2
GO1	Austin Peay	2
GR1	Stetson	5
GR1	Stetson	10
GO4	Central Arkansas	2
GR1	Stetson	5
GR3	Florida Gulf Coast	4
GO2	Lipscomb	6
GR3	Florida Gulf Coast	7	GR1	Stetson	5	–
GR3	Florida Gulf Coast	6^{(6)}	–
Lower round 1	Lower round 2	Lower round 3	Lower final
GO3	North Alabama	2
GO3	North Alabama	14	GR2	Jacksonville	3	GO1	Austin Peay	3
GR4	North Florida	11	GR2	Jacksonville	2	GR3	Florida Gulf Coast	6
GR3	Florida Gulf Coast	4
GR3	Florida Gulf Coast	12
GO4	Central Arkansas	7	GO4	Central Arkansas	5
GO2	Lipscomb	4

== Schedule ==
Game	Time*	Matchup^{#}	Score	Notes	Reference
Tuesday, May 20
1	9:00 am	Gold No. 3 North Alabama vs Graphite No. 2 Jacksonville	2−4		
2	12:30 pm	Graphite No. 4 North Florida vs Gold No. 1 Austin Peay	2−10		
3	4:00 pm	Gold No. 4 Central Arkansas vs Graphite No. 1 Stetson	2−10		
4	7:30 pm	Graphite No. 3 Florida Gulf Coast vs Gold No. 2 Lipscomb	7−6		
Wednesday, May 21
5	2:00 pm	Gold No. 3 North Alabama vs Graphite No. 4 North Florida	14−11	North Florida Eliminated	
6	6:00 pm	Gold No. 4 Central Arkansas vs Gold No. 2 Lipscomb	7−4	Lipscomb Eliminated	
Thursday, May 22
7	2:00 pm	Graphite No. 2 Jacksonville vs Gold No. 1 Austin Peay	1−9		
8	6:00 pm	Graphite No. 1 Stetson vs Graphite No. 3 Florida Gulf Coast	5−4		
Friday, May 23
9	10:00 am	Gold No. 3 North Alabama vs Graphite No. 2 Jacksonville	2−3	North Alabama Eliminated	
10	2:00 pm	Gold No. 4 Central Arkansas vs Graphite No. 3 Florida Gulf Coast	5-12	Central Arkansas Eliminated	
11	6:00 pm	Gold No. 1 Austin Peay vs Graphite No. 1 Stetson	2-5		
Saturday, May 24
12	12:00 pm	Graphite No. 2 Jacksonville vs Graphite No. 3 Florida Gulf Coast	2−4	Jacksonville eliminated	
13	4:00 pm	Gold No. 1 Austin Peay vs Graphite No. 3 Florida Gulf Coast	3−6	Austin Peay eliminated	
Sunday, May 25
14	12:00 pm	Graphite No. 3 Florida Gulf Coast vs Graphite No. 1 Stetson	6−5 (F/6)		
15	4:00 pm	Graphite No. 1 Stetson vs Graphite No. 3 Florida Gulf Coast	Cancelled	FGCU and Stetson declared co-champs Stetson received NCAA berth (Note: The if necessary game was cancelled due to inclement weather. With Florida Gulf Coast and Stetson having a 1–1 record against each other, both teams were recognized as 2025 ASUN Co-Tournament Champions with Stetson receiving the NCAA tournament berth per conference policy.)	
