= 2009 Atlantic Sun Conference baseball tournament =

American college baseball tournament

- Teams: 6
- Format: Double-elimination
- Finals site: Melching Field at Conrad Park; DeLand, FL
- Champions: Jacksonville (4th title)
- Winning coach: Terry Alexander (4th title)
- MVP: Alex Martinez (Jacksonville)

2009 Atlantic Sun Conference baseball standings
	Conf.				Overall
Team	W		L	PCT	W		L	PCT
Florida Gulf Coast ‍†‍‍	23	–	7	.767	36	–	18	.667
Kennesaw State ‍‍‍	20	–	9	.690	30	–	22	.577
Jacksonville ‍‍‡‍^{y}	19	–	11	.633	37	–	22	.627
Lipscomb ‍‍‍	17	–	13	.567	24	–	32	.429
Stetson ‍‍‍	16	–	14	.533	27	–	30	.474
Belmont ‍‍‍	15	–	15	.500	29	–	29	.500
North Florida ‍‍‍	15	–	15	.500	23	–	31	.426
Mercer ‍‍‍	12	–	15	.444	23	–	23	.500
East Tennessee State ‍‍‍	10	–	20	.333	25	–	28	.472
Campbell ‍‍‍	7	–	19	.269	27	–	24	.529
South Carolina Upstate ‍‍‍	7	–	23	.233	17	–	37	.315
† – Conference champion ‡ – Tournament champion y – Invited to the NCAA tournament As of June 30, 2009; Rankings from Collegiate Baseball

The 2009 Atlantic Sun Conference baseball tournament was held at Melching Field at Conrad Park on the campus of Stetson University in DeLand, Florida, from May 21 through 24. Jacksonville won its fourth tournament championship to earn the Atlantic Sun Conference's automatic bid to the 2009 NCAA Division I baseball tournament. The event was heavily marred by rain, resulting in two format changes. Originally planned as a six team double-elimination tournament, the format was changed to a single elimination format.

== Seeding ==
The top six teams (based on conference results) from the conference earn invites to the tournament. Florida Gulf Coast, Kennesaw State, North Florida, and South Carolina Upstate were ineligible for the tournament due to NCAA rules after reclassifying to Division I.

Team	W	L	PCT	GB	Seed
Florida Gulf Coast	23	7	.767	–	–
Kennesaw State	20	9	.690	2.5	–
Jacksonville	19	11	.633	4	1
Lipscomb	17	13	.567	6	2
Stetson	16	14	.533	7	3
Belmont	15	15	.500	8	4
North Florida	15	15	.500	8	–
Mercer	12	15	.444	9.5	5
East Tennessee State	10	20	.333	13	6
Campbell	7	19	.269	14	–
South Carolina Upstate	7	23	.233	16	–

== Results ==
First round
4	Belmont	6
5	Mercer	5
3	Stetson	2
6	East Tennessee State	4

Semifinals
1	Jacksonville	7
4	Belmont	5
2	Lipscomb	5
6	East Tennessee State	4

Finals
1	Jacksonville	7
2	Lipscomb	4

== All-Tournament Team ==
The following players were named to the All-Tournament Team.

Pos	Name	Team
P	Billy Schlee	Jacksonville
P	Rex Brothers	Lipscomb
C	Jeremy Gillan	Jacksonville
IF	Bo Reeder	East Tennessee State
IF	Alex Martinez	Jacksonville
IF	Chuck Opachich	Jacksonville
IF	Justin Sanders	Lipscomb
OF	Dylan Craig	Belmont
OF	Kyle Fleming	Jacksonville
OF	Thomas Myers	Jacksonville
OF	Antonio Butler	Lipscomb

=== Tournament Most Valuable Player ===
Alex Martinez was named Tournament Most Valuable Player. Martinez was an infielder for Jacksonville.
