= 2004 Atlantic Sun Conference baseball tournament =

American college baseball tournament

- Teams: 6
- Format: Double-elimination
- Finals site: Melching Field at Conrad Park; DeLand, FL
- Champions: Florida Atlantic (1st title)
- Winning coach: Kevin Cooney (1st title)
- MVP: Rusty Brown (Florida Atlantic)

2004 Atlantic Sun Conference baseball standings
	Conf.				Overall
Team	W		L	PCT	W		L	PCT
No. 25 UCF ‍†‍‍^{y}	24	–	6	.800	47	–	18	.723
No. 30 Florida Atlantic ‍‍‡‍^{y}	20	–	10	.667	47	–	17	.734
Stetson ‍‍‍	20	–	10	.667	36	–	23	.610
Gardner–Webb ‍‍‍	19	–	11	.633	32	–	25	.561
Troy ‍‍‍	15	–	15	.500	36	–	22	.621
Campbell ‍‍‍	14	–	16	.467	23	–	34	.404
Belmont ‍‍‍	13	–	17	.433	31	–	23	.574
Jacksonville ‍‍‍	12	–	18	.400	25	–	31	.446
Georgia State ‍‍‍	11	–	19	.367	18	–	36	.333
Lipscomb ‍‍‍	9	–	21	.300	15	–	39	.278
Mercer ‍‍‍	8	–	22	.267	20	–	35	.364
† – Conference champion ‡ – Tournament champion y – Invited to the NCAA tournament As of June 30, 2004; Rankings from Collegiate Baseball

The 2004 Atlantic Sun Conference baseball tournament was held at Melching Field at Conrad Park on the campus of Stetson University in DeLand, Florida, from May 26 through 29. Florida Atlantic won its first and only tournament championship to earn the Atlantic Sun Conference's automatic bid to the 2004 NCAA Division I baseball tournament.

== Seeding ==
The top six teams (based on conference results) from the conference earn invites to the tournament.

Team	W	L	PCT	GB	Seed
UCF	24	6	.800	—	1
Stetson	20	10	.667	4	2
Florida Atlantic	20	10	.667	4	3
Gardner–Webb	19	11	.633	5	4
Troy	15	15	.500	9	5
Campbell	14	16	.467	10	6
Belmont	13	17	.433	11	—
Jacksonville	12	18	.400	12	—
Georgia State	11	19	.367	13	—
Lipscomb	9	21	.300	15	—
Mercer	8	22	.267	16	—

== Results ==
First round
1	UCF	6
6	Campbell	5
2	Stetson	4
5	Troy	2
3	Florida Atlantic	7
4	Gardner–Webb	4

Second round
1	UCF	10
4	Gardner–Webb	7
2	Stetson	1
3	Florida Atlantic	15
6	Campbell	11
5	Troy	13

Third round
1	UCF	4
3	Florida Atlantic	7
2	Stetson	3
5	Troy	5

Semifinals
1	UCF	7
5	Troy	9

Final
3	Florida Atlantic	21	—
5	Troy	2	—

== All-Tournament Team ==
The following players were named to the All-Tournament Team.

Pos	Name	Team
P	Chris Saxton	Florida Atlantic
P	Nate Moore	Troy
C	Drew Butera	UCF
C	Henry Gutierrez	Troy
IF	Rusty Brown	Florida Atlantic
IF	Matt Ray	UCF
IF	Derek Hutton	Florida Atlantic
IF	Evan Brannon	Florida Atlantic
OF	Dee Brown	UCF
OF	Tim Mascia	Florida Atlantic
OF	Adam Godwin	Troy

=== Tournament Most Valuable Player ===
Rusty Brown was named Tournament Most Valuable Player. Brown was an infielder for Florida Atlantic.
