= 2011 Atlantic Sun Conference baseball tournament =

American college baseball tournament

- Teams: 6
- Format: Double-elimination
- Finals site: Ken Dugan Field at Stephen Lee Marsh Stadium; Nashville, TN
- Champions: Belmont (1st title)
- Winning coach: Dave Jarvis (1st title)
- MVP: Derek Hamblen (Belmont)

2011 Atlantic Sun Conference baseball standings
	Conf.				Overall
Team	W		L	PCT	W		L	PCT
No. 30 Stetson ‍†‍‍^{y}	23	–	7	.767	43	–	20	.683
Jacksonville ‍‍‍^{y}	19	–	11	.633	37	–	24	.607
Kennesaw State ‍‍‍	18	–	11	.621	32	–	25	.561
Mercer ‍‍‍	17	–	12	.586	39	–	20	.661
East Tennessee State ‍‍‍	16	–	12	.571	36	–	21	.632
Belmont ‍‍‡‍^{y}	17	–	13	.567	38	–	26	.594
Florida Gulf Coast ‍‍‍	16	–	14	.533	27	–	28	.491
North Florida ‍‍‍	13	–	17	.433	27	–	27	.500
South Carolina Upstate ‍‍‍	10	–	18	.357	19	–	36	.345
Lipscomb ‍‍‍	10	–	20	.333	19	–	36	.345
Campbell ‍‍‍	3	–	27	.100	17	–	37	.315
† – Conference champion ‡ – Tournament champion y – Invited to the NCAA tournament As of June 30, 2011; Rankings from Collegiate Baseball

The 2011 Atlantic Sun Conference baseball tournament was held at Ken Dugan Field at Stephen Lee Marsh Stadium on the campus of Lipscomb University in Nashville, TN from May 25 through 28. Belmont won its first tournament championship to earn the Atlantic Sun Conference's automatic bid to the 2011 NCAA Division I baseball tournament.

== Seeding ==
The top six teams (based on conference results) from the conference earn invites to the tournament.

Team	W	L	PCT	GB	Seed
Stetson	23	7	.767	–	1
Jacksonville	19	11	.633	4	2
Kennesaw State	18	11	.621	4.5	3
Mercer	17	12	.586	5.5	4
East Tennessee State	16	12	.571	6	5
Belmont	17	13	.567	6	6
Florida Gulf Coast	16	14	.533	7	–
North Florida	13	17	.433	10	–
South Carolina Upstate	10	18	.357	12	–
Lipscomb	10	20	.333	13	–
Campbell	3	27	.100	10	–

== Results ==
First round
1	Stetson	3
6	Belmont	15
2	Jacksonville	2
5	East Tennessee State	1
3	Kennesaw State	4
4	Mercer	6

Second round
6	Belmont	4
3	Kennesaw State	1
2	Jacksonville	1
4	Mercer	2
1	Stetson	7
5	East Tennessee State	2

Third round
6	Belmont	6
4	Mercer	4
2	Jacksonville	5
1	Stetson	3

Semifinals
4	Mercer	1
2	Jacksonville	0

Final
6	Belmont	9
4	Mercer	7

== All-Tournament Team ==
Pos	Name	Team
P	Chas Brookshire	Belmont
P	JT Odom	Mercer
P	Matthew Tomshow	Jacksonville
C	Matt Zeblo	Belmont
IF	Adam Brett Walker	Jacksonville
IF	Zac Mitchell	Belmont
IF	John Moreland	Mercer
IF	Mark Jones	Stetson
OF	Derek Hamblen	Belmont
OF	Mitchel Brennan	Stetson
OF	Billy Burns	Mercer
