= 2013 Atlantic Sun Conference baseball tournament =

American college baseball tournament

- Teams: 8
- Format: Double-elimination
- Finals site: Melching Field at Conrad Park; DeLand, FL
- Champions: East Tennessee State (1st title)
- Winning coach: Tony Skole (1st title)
- MVP: Kerry Doane (East Tennessee State)

2013 Atlantic Sun Conference baseball standings
	Conf.				Overall
Team	W		L	PCT	W		L	PCT
Mercer ‍†‍‍^{y}	20	–	7	.741	43	–	18	.705
Florida Gulf Coast ‍‍‍	19	–	8	.704	37	–	20	.649
North Florida ‍‍‍	18	–	9	.667	40	–	19	.678
East Tennessee State ‍‍‡‍^{y}	17	–	10	.630	36	–	24	.600
Stetson ‍‍‍	15	–	12	.556	26	–	31	.456
Kennesaw State ‍‍‍	13	–	14	.481	30	–	30	.500
Lipscomb ‍‍‍	13	–	14	.481	25	–	34	.424
South Carolina Upstate ‍‍‍	9	–	18	.333	28	–	30	.483
Jacksonville ‍‍‍	8	–	19	.296	17	–	38	.309
Northern Kentucky ‍‍‍	3	–	24	.111	8	–	47	.145
† – Conference champion ‡ – Tournament champion y – Invited to the NCAA tournament As of June 3, 2013; Rankings from Collegiate Baseball

The 2013 Atlantic Sun Conference baseball tournament was held at Melching Field at Conrad Park on the campus of Stetson University in DeLand, Florida, from May 22 through 25. East Tennessee State won their first tournament championship and claimed the Atlantic Sun Conference's automatic bid to the 2013 NCAA Division I baseball tournament. The Buccaneers joined the conference in 2005.

== Format and seeding ==
The 2013 tournament was an 8-team double-elimination tournament. The top eight teams (based on conference results) from the conference earned invitations to the tournament. Northern Kentucky was not eligible for the tournament while it was reclassifying from Division II. Kennesaw State claimed the sixth seed over Lipscomb by tiebreaker.

Team	W	L	Pct.	GB	Seed
Mercer	20	7	.741	–	1
Florida Gulf Coast	19	8	.704	1	2
North Florida	18	9	.667	2	3
East Tennessee State	17	10	.630	3	4
Stetson	15	12	.556	5	5
Lipscomb	13	14	.481	8	6
Kennesaw State	13	14	.481	8	7
USC Upstate	9	18	.333	12	8
Jacksonville	8	19	.296	13	–
Northern Kentucky	3	24	.111	18	–

== Bracket and results ==
First round
1	Mercer	12
8	USC Upstate	6
4	East Tennessee State	4*
5	Stetson	3
8	USC Upstate	6
5	Stetson	0
3	North Florida	6
6	Lipscomb	1
2	Florida Gulf Coast	1
7	Kennesaw State	3
6	Lipscomb	3
2	Florida Gulf Coast	2

Second round
1	Mercer	4
4	East Tennessee State	7
8	USC Upstate	10
1	Mercer	1
3	North Florida	8*
7	Kennesaw State	7
7	Kennesaw State	4
6	Lipscomb	2

Semifinals
4	East Tennessee State	4	—
8	USC Upstate	3	—
3	North Florida	2	2
7	Kennesaw State	5	4

Final
4	East Tennessee State	7
7	Kennesaw State	2

- * Game went to extra innings

== All-Tournament Team ==
The following players were named to the All-Tournament Team.

Position	Player	School
IF	Chesny Young	Mercer
OF/P	Gaither Bumgardner	USC Upstate
P	Brandon Lee	USC Upstate
OF	Tyler Lesch	USC Upstate
OF	Jacob Bruce	Kennesaw State
IF	Chris McGowan	Kennesaw State
C	Max Pentecost	Kennesaw State
IF	Derek Niesman	East Tennessee State
IF	Alex Reynolds	East Tennessee State
OF	Jeremy Taylor	East Tennessee State
P	Kerry Doane	East Tennessee State

=== Most Valuable Player ===
Kerry Doane was named Tournament Most Valuable Player. Doane was a pitcher for East Tennessee State.
