= 2015 Atlantic Sun Conference baseball tournament =

American college baseball tournament

- Teams: 6
- Format: Double-elimination
- Finals site: Swanson Stadium; Fort Myers, FL
- Champions: Lipscomb (2nd title)
- Winning coach: Jeff Forehand (2nd title)
- MVP: Jonathan Allison (Lipscomb)

2015 Atlantic Sun Conference baseball standings
| | Conf. | | | | | | Overall |
| Team | W | | L | | T | PCT | W | | L | | T | PCT |
|---|---|---|---|---|---|---|---|---|---|---|---|---|
| North Florida ‍†‍‍ | 16 | – | 5 | – | 0 | .762 | 45 | – | 16 | – | 0 | .738 |
| Lipscomb ‍‍‡‍^{y} | 13 | – | 8 | – | 0 | .619 | 39 | – | 20 | – | 0 | .661 |
| Stetson ‍‍‍ | 12 | – | 9 | – | 0 | .571 | 29 | – | 30 | – | 0 | .492 |
| Jacksonville ‍‍‍ | 12 | – | 9 | – | 0 | .571 | 26 | – | 30 | – | 0 | .464 |
| Florida Gulf Coast ‍‍‍ | 11 | – | 9 | – | 0 | .550 | 30 | – | 26 | – | 1 | .535 |
| Kennesaw State ‍‍‍ | 10 | – | 10 | – | 0 | .500 | 28 | – | 28 | – | 0 | .500 |
| Northern Kentucky ‍‍‍ | 5 | – | 16 | – | 0 | .238 | 17 | – | 34 | – | 0 | .333 |
| USC Upstate ‍‍‍ | 4 | – | 17 | – | 0 | .190 | 15 | – | 38 | – | 0 | .283 |
† – Conference champion ‡ – Tournament champion y – Invited to the NCAA tournament As of June 30, 2015; Rankings from Collegiate Baseball

The 2015 Atlantic Sun Conference baseball tournament was at Swanson Stadium on the campus of Florida Gulf Coast University in Fort Myers, Florida, from May 20 through 23. Lipscomb won their second tournament title and claimed the Atlantic Sun Conference's automatic bid to the 2015 NCAA Division I baseball tournament.

== Format and seeding ==
The 2015 tournament will be a double-elimination tournament in which the top six conference finishers will participate. For the first time, Northern Kentucky was eligible for the event, despite not fully completing its reclassification from Division II. However, the Norse failed to qualify for the tournament.

| Team | W | L | Pct | GB | Seed |
|---|---|---|---|---|---|
| North Florida | 16 | 5 | .762 | – | 1 |
| Lipscomb | 13 | 8 | .619 | 3 | 2 |
| Stetson | 12 | 9 | .571 | 4 | 3 |
| Jacksonville | 12 | 9 | .571 | 4 | 4 |
| Florida Gulf Coast | 11 | 9 | .550 | 4.5 | 5 |
| Kennesaw State | 10 | 10 | .500 | 5.5 | 6 |
| Northern Kentucky | 5 | 16 | .238 | 11 | – |
| USC Upstate | 4 | 17 | .190 | 12 | – |

== Bracket and results ==
First round
1 | North Florida | 14
6 | Kennesaw State | 0
2 | Lipscomb | 2
5 | Florida Gulf Coast | 1
3 | Stetson | 8*
4 | Jacksonville | 7

Second round
1 | North Florida | 8
4 | Jacksonville | 3
2 | Lipscomb | 9
3 | Stetson | 5
6 | Kennesaw State | 2
5 | Florida Gulf Coast | 6

Quarterfinals
1 | North Florida | 1
2 | Lipscomb | 2
3 | Stetson | 2
5 | Florida Gulf Coast | 3

Semifinals
1 | North Florida | 8
5 | Florida Gulf Coast | 2

Finals
2 | Lipscomb | 8 | –
1 | North Florida | 7 | –

== All-Tournament Team ==
The following players were named to the All-Tournament Team.

| Pos. | Name | School |
|---|---|---|
| P | Nick Andros | Lipscomb |
| P | Brady Puckett | Lipscomb |
| P | Evan Incinelli | North Florida |
| C | Patrick Mazeika | Stetson |
| IF | Jake Noll | Florida Gulf Coast |
| IF | Grant Massey | Lipscomb |
| IF | Kyle Brooks | North Florida |
| IF | Ryan Roberson | North Florida |
| OF | Jonathan Allison | Lipscomb |
| OF | Nathan Koslowski | Jacksonville |
| OF | Donnie Dewees | North Florida |

=== Most Valuable Player ===
Jonathan Allison was named Tournament Most Valuable Player. The senior outfielder for Lipscomb recorded six hits and four RBI over four games.
