= 2010 Atlantic Sun Conference baseball tournament =

American college baseball tournament

- Teams: 6
- Format: Double-elimination
- Finals site: Ken Dugan Field at Stephen Lee Marsh Stadium; Nashville, TN
- Champions: Mercer (4th title)
- Winning coach: Craig Gibson (1st title)
- MVP: Jacob Tanis (Mercer)

2010 Atlantic Sun Conference baseball standings
	Conf.				Overall
Team	W		L	PCT	W		L	PCT
Florida Gulf Coast ‍†‍‍	25	–	5	.833	38	–	20	.655
Mercer ‍‍‡‍^{y}	16	–	11	.593	38	–	24	.613
East Tennessee State ‍‍‍	15	–	12	.556	32	–	28	.533
North Florida ‍‍‍	14	–	12	.538	30	–	28	.517
Jacksonville ‍‍‍	14	–	12	.538	27	–	29	.482
Stetson ‍‍‍	14	–	13	.519	27	–	31	.466
Belmont ‍‍‍	13	–	13	.500	27	–	27	.500
Kennesaw State ‍‍‍	12	–	15	.444	23	–	32	.418
Lipscomb ‍‍‍	9	–	17	.346	19	–	36	.345
Campbell ‍‍‍	8	–	19	.296	28	–	27	.509
South Carolina Upstate ‍‍‍	8	–	19	.296	19	–	37	.339
† – Conference champion ‡ – Tournament champion y – Invited to the NCAA tournament As of June 30, 2010; Rankings from Collegiate Baseball

The 2010 Atlantic Sun Conference baseball tournament was held at Ken Dugan Field at Stephen Lee Marsh Stadium on the campus of Lipscomb University in Nashville, TN from May 25 through 28. Mercer won its fourth tournament championship, and first since 1983, to earn the Atlantic Sun Conference's automatic bid to the 2010 NCAA Division I baseball tournament.

This was the first of two Atlantic Sun Conference Baseball Tournaments to be hosted by Lipscomb University after eight years at Stetson University's in DeLand, FL. It was also the first year of postseason eligibility for three new conference members: Florida Gulf Coast, Kennesaw State, and North Florida, who replaced the departed Florida Atlantic, FIU, and UCF as members by transitioning to Division I.

== Seeding ==
The top six teams (based on conference results) from the conference earn invites to the tournament.

Team	W	L	PCT	GB	Seed
Florida Gulf Coast	25	5	.833	–	1
Mercer	16	11	.593	7.5	2
East Tennessee State	15	12	.556	8.5	3
North Florida	14	12	.586	9	4
Jacksonville	14	12	.586	9	5
Stetson	14	13	.519	9.5	6
Belmont	13	13	.500	10	–
Kennesaw State	12	15	.444	11.5	–
Lipscomb	9	17	.346	14	–
Campbell	8	19	.296	15.5	–
South Carolina Upstate	8	19	.296	15.5	–

== Results ==
First round
1	Florida Gulf Coast	9
6	Stetson	4
3	East Tennessee State	7
4	North Florida	5
2	Mercer	10
5	Jacksonville	1

Second round
1	Florida Gulf Coast	2
4	North Florida	13
6	Stetson	2
5	Jacksonville	3
3	East Tennessee State	7
2	Mercer	10
1	Florida Gulf Coast	10
3	East Tennessee State	12

Third round
4	North Florida	8
5	Jacksonville	9
2	Mercer	3
3	East Tennessee State	1

Final
5	Jacksonville	3	–
2	Mercer	7	–

== All-Tournament Team ==
Pos	Name	Team
P	Brandon Love	Mercer
P	David Teasley	Mercer
C	Nick DiMauro	Mercer
IF	Jacob Tanis (MVP)	Mercer
IF	Jamaal Hawkins	Jacksonville
IF	Paul Hoilman	East Tennessee State
IF	Mikel Alvarez	Florida Gulf Coast
OF	Billy Burns	Mercer
OF	Preston Hale	North Florida
OF	Matthew Scruggs	East Tennessee State
OF/P	Chas Byrne	East Tennessee State
