= David Jarvis =

David Jarvis may refer to:

- David H. Jarvis (1862–1911), American military serviceman and captain in the United States Revenue Cutter Service
- Dave Jarvis, American baseball coach
