= 2005 Atlantic Sun Conference baseball tournament =

American college baseball tournament

- Teams: 6
- Format: Double-elimination
- Finals site: Melching Field at Conrad Park; DeLand, FL
- Champions: Stetson (5th title)
- Winning coach: Pete Dunn (5th title)
- MVP: Brandon Paritz (Stetson)

2005 Atlantic Sun Conference baseball standings
	Conf.				Overall
Team	W		L	PCT	W		L	PCT
Troy ‍†‍‍	23	–	7	.767	37	–	21	.638
Florida Atlantic ‍‍‍^{y}	19	–	11	.633	37	–	24	.607
UCF ‍‍‍	19	–	11	.633	42	–	18	.700
Stetson ‍‍‡‍^{y}	16	–	14	.533	35	–	28	.556
Georgia State ‍‍‍	15	–	15	.500	25	–	32	.439
Gardner–Webb ‍‍‍	15	–	15	.500	28	–	30	.483
Campbell ‍‍‍	13	–	17	.433	25	–	29	.463
Jacksonville ‍‍‍	13	–	17	.433	23	–	31	.426
Belmont ‍‍‍	12	–	18	.400	28	–	26	.519
Mercer ‍‍‍	12	–	18	.400	28	–	26	.519
Lipscomb ‍‍‍	8	–	22	.267	23	–	33	.411
† – Conference champion ‡ – Tournament champion y – Invited to the NCAA tournament As of June 30, 2005; Rankings from Collegiate Baseball

The 2005 Atlantic Sun Conference baseball tournament was held at Melching Field at Conrad Park on the campus of Stetson University in DeLand, Florida, from May 26 through 28. Stetson won its fifth tournament championship to earn the Atlantic Sun Conference's automatic bid to the 2005 NCAA Division I baseball tournament.

== Seeding ==
The top six teams (based on conference results) from the conference earn invites to the tournament.

Team	W	L	PCT	GB	Seed
Troy	23	7	.767	—	1
Florida Atlantic	19	11	.633	4	2
UCF	19	11	.633	4	3
Stetson	16	14	.533	7	4
Georgia State	15	15	.500	8	5
Gardner–Webb	15	15	.500	8	6
Campbell	13	17	.433	10	—
Jacksonville	13	17	.433	10	—
Belmont	12	18	.400	11	—
Mercer	12	18	.400	11	—
Lipscomb	8	22	.267	15	—

== Results ==
First round
1	Troy	2
6	Gardner–Webb	8
3	UCF	5
4	Stetson	8
2	Florida Atlantic	11
5	Georgia State	1

Second round
6	Gardner–Webb	0
3	UCF	3
1	Troy	7
5	Georgia State	0
4	Stetson	0
2	Florida Atlantic	3
4	Stetson	6
6	Gardner–Webb	5

Third round
3	UCF	5
1	Troy	1
2	Florida Atlantic	3
4	Stetson	7

Semifinals
3	UCF	3
2	Florida Atlantic	5

Final
2	Florida Atlantic	0
4	Stetson	8

== All-Tournament Team ==
The following players were named to the All-Tournament Team.

Pos	Name	Team
P	Mickey Storey	Florida Atlantic
P	Robbie Elsemiller	Stetson
P	Chris Salberg	Florida Atlantic
C	Drew Butera	UCF
IF	Brian Bocock	Stetson
IF	Blake Lalli	Gardner–Webb
IF	Matt Ray	UCF
OF	Jon Shapland	Florida Atlantic
OF	John DeStefano	Stetson
OF	Shane Jordan	Stetson
DH	John Still	Stetson

=== Tournament Most Valuable Player ===
Shane Jordan was named Tournament Most Valuable Player. Jordan was an outfielder for Stetson.
