= 2007 Atlantic Sun Conference baseball tournament =

American college baseball tournament

- Teams: 6
- Format: Double-elimination
- Finals site: Melching Field at Conrad Park; DeLand, FL
- Champions: Jacksonville (3rd title)
- Winning coach: Terry Alexander (3rd title)
- MVP: Pete Clifford (Jacksonville)

2007 Atlantic Sun Conference baseball standings
	Conf.				Overall
Team	W		L	PCT	W		L	PCT
Stetson ‍†‍‍^{y}	21	–	6	.778	42	–	21	.667
Mercer ‍‍‍	17	–	10	.630	33	–	25	.569
Belmont ‍‍‍	16	–	11	.593	34	–	26	.567
Jacksonville ‍‍‡‍^{y}	15	–	12	.556	34	–	28	.548
Kennesaw State ‍‍‍	13	–	14	.481	32	–	23	.582
North Florida ‍‍‍	13	–	14	.481	24	–	32	.429
Lipscomb ‍‍‍	12	–	15	.444	28	–	30	.483
Gardner–Webb ‍‍‍	12	–	15	.444	26	–	32	.448
East Tennessee State ‍‍‍	11	–	16	.407	26	–	29	.473
Campbell ‍‍‍	5	–	22	.185	11	–	45	.196
† – Conference champion ‡ – Tournament champion y – Invited to the NCAA tournament As of June 30, 2007; Rankings from Collegiate Baseball

The 2007 Atlantic Sun Conference baseball tournament was held at Melching Field at Conrad Park on the campus of Stetson University in DeLand, Florida, from May 23 through 26. Jacksonville won its third tournament championship to earn the Atlantic Sun Conference's automatic bid to the 2007 NCAA Division I baseball tournament.

== Seeding ==
The top six teams (based on conference results) from the conference earn invites to the tournament. Kennesaw State and North Florida were ineligible for the tournament due to NCAA rules after reclassifying to Division I.

Team	W	L	PCT	GB	Seed
Stetson	21	6	.778	–	1
Mercer	17	10	.630	4	2
Belmont	16	11	.593	5	3
Jacksonville	15	12	.556	6	4
Kennesaw State	13	14	.481	8	–
North Florida	13	14	.481	8	–
Gardner–Webb	12	15	.444	9	5
Lipscomb	12	15	.444	9	6
East Tennessee State	11	16	.407	10	–
Campbell	5	22	.185	16	–

== Results ==
First round
1	Stetson	4
6	Lipscomb	3
3	Belmont	12
4	Jacksonville	7
2	Mercer	5
5	Gardner–Webb	4

Second round
1	Stetson	1
4	Jacksonville	4
6	Lipscomb	1
5	Gardner–Webb	4
3	Belmont	4*
2	Mercer	3*
1	Stetson	2†
2	Mercer	1†

Third round
4	Jacksonville	4
5	Gardner–Webb	0
3	Belmont	18
1	Stetson	5

Final
4	Jacksonville	10	7
3	Belmont	4	6

* - Indicates game required 10 innings.
† - Indicates game required 11 innings.

== All-Tournament Team ==
The following players were named to the All-Tournament Team.

Pos	Name	Team
P	Jake Hitchcock	Stetson
P	Matt Davis	Jacksonville
P	Carson Andrew	Jacksonville
C	Brady Manifold	Belmont
IF	Matt Reynolds	Belmont
IF	Daniel Wagner	Belmont
IF	Ryan McArdle	Jacksonville
IF	Chuck Opachich	Jacksonville
OF	Kane Simmons	Belmont
OF	Mike McCallister	Jacksonville
OF	Pete Clifford	Jacksonville

=== Tournament Most Valuable Player ===
Pete Clifford was named Tournament Most Valuable Player. Clifford was an outfielder for Jacksonville.
