= 1979 Trans America Athletic Conference baseball tournament =

American college baseball tournament

- Teams: 5
- Format: Double-elimination
- Finals site: Centenary Park (baseball); Shreveport, LA
- Champions: Mercer (1st title)
- Winning coach: Barry Myers (1st title)

1979 Trans America Athletic Conference baseball standings
| | Conf. | | | | Overall |
| Team | W | | L | PCT | W | | L | PCT |
|---|---|---|---|---|---|---|---|---|
| Mercer ‍‍‡‍ | 0 | – | 0 | – | 38 | – | 16 | .704 |
| Oklahoma City ‍‍‍ | 0 | – | 0 | – | 31 | – | 23 | .574 |
| Centenary ‍‍‍ | 0 | – | 0 | – | 28 | – | 19 | .596 |
| Northeast Louisiana ‍‍‍ | 0 | – | 0 | – | 22 | – | 26 | .458 |
| Hardin–Simmons ‍‍‍ | 0 | – | 0 | – | 14 | – | 25 | .359 |
‡ – Tournament champion As of June 30, 1979; Rankings from Collegiate Baseball

The 1979 Trans America Athletic Conference (TAAC) baseball tournament, the first-ever for the league known since the 2001–02 school year as the Atlantic Sun Conference, was held at Centenary Park on the campus of Centenary College in Shreveport, Louisiana, from May 10 through 13. Mercer won the first tournament championship. As a new conference, the TAAC did not have an automatic bid to the 1979 NCAA Division I baseball tournament.

== Format ==
The new league used a blind draw to determine matchups, and records for any earlier games between conference members are incomplete. The teams played a five team, double elimination tournament.

== Results ==
Upper round 1 | Upper round 2 | Upper final | Final
Mercer | 3
Oklahoma City | 6 | Oklahoma City | 0
Centenary | 3 | Mercer | 8
Hardin–Simmons | 0
Mercer | 14
Hardin–Simmons | 7 | Hardin–Simmons | 1
Northeast Louisiana | 0
Mercer | 8 | 6
Oklahoma City | 11 | 3
Lower round 1 | Lower round 2 | Lower round 3 | Lower final
Oklahoma City | 14
Centenary | 9* | Northeast Louisiana | 5
Northeast Louisiana | 10*

* - Indicates game required 10 innings.

== All-Tournament Team ==
The following players were named to the All-Tournament Team. No MVP was named until 1985.

| POS | Player | School |
|---|---|---|
| P | Ken McLeod | Hardin–Simmons |
| P | Dwight Erhard | Oklahoma City |
| P | Dan Fitzsimmons | Mercer |
| 1B | Jay Branham | Northeast Louisiana |
| 1B | Scott Halam | Mercer |
| OF | Steve Brumfield | Centenary |
| OF | Rusty Hamric | Hardin–Simmons |
| OF | Frank Millerd | Mercer |
| OF | Don Murphy | Oklahoma City |
| OF | Jay Ross | Mercer |
| DH | Tom Patman | Oklahoma City |
