= 1981 Trans America Athletic Conference baseball tournament =

American college baseball tournament

- Teams: 4
- Format: Double-elimination
- Finals site: Hunter Field; Abilene, TX
- Champions: Mercer (2nd title)
- Winning coach: Barry Myers (2nd title)

1981 Trans America Athletic Conference baseball standings
	Conf.						Overall
Team	W		L		T	PCT	W		L		T	PCT
East
Georgia Southern ^{x}‍†‍‍	9	–	0	–	0	1.000	41	–	22	–	1	.648
Mercer ‍‍‡‍	3	–	4	–	0	.429	39	–	12	–	1	.760
Arkansas–Little Rock ‍‍‍	0	–	6	–	0	.000	22	–	25	–	0	.468
West
Hardin–Simmons ^{x}‍‍‍	8	–	4	–	0	.667	20	–	28	–	0	.417
Centenary ‍‍‍	8	–	4	–	0	.667	33	–	29	–	0	.532
Northeast Louisiana ‍‍‍	6	–	6	–	0	.500	33	–	22	–	0	.600
Northwestern State ‍‍‍	2	–	10	–	0	.167	16	–	42	–	0	.276
x – Division champion † – Conference champion ‡ – Tournament champion As of June 30, 1981; Rankings from Collegiate Baseball

The 1981 Trans America Athletic Conference baseball tournament was held at Hunter Field on the campus of Hardin–Simmons University in Abilene, Texas, from April 30 through May 2. This was the third tournament championship held by the Trans America Athletic Conference, in its third year of existence. Mercer won their second tournament championship.

== Seeding and format ==
The TAAC established two divisions beginning in 1981, and brought the two division winners and second place team from each division to the tournament. Each division winner played the opposite division runner up in the first round in the four team double elimination tournament. Hardin-Simmons claimed the West's top seed by tiebreaker.

Team	W	L	Pct.	GB	Seed
East
Georgia Southern	9	0	1.000	–	1E
Mercer	3	4	.429	5	2E
Arkansas–Little Rock	0	6	.000	7.5	–

Team	W	L	Pct.	GB	Seed
West
Hardin–Simmons	8	4	.667	–	1W
Centenary	8	4	.667	–	2W
Northeast Louisiana	6	6	.500	2	–
Northwestern State	2	10	.167	6	–

== Results ==
First round
1E	Georgia Southern	4
2W	Centenary	3
1W	Hardin–Simmons	5
2E	Mercer	7
Lower round 1
2W	Centenary	9
1W	Hardin–Simmons	1

Semi-finals
1E	Georgia Southern	3
2E	Mercer	5
Lower final
1E	Georgia Southern	5
2W	Centenary	4

Finals
2E	Mercer	9	–
1E	Georgia Southern	3	–

== All-Tournament Team ==
The following players were named to the All-Tournament Team. No MVP was named until 1985.

POS	Player	School
P	Scott Barnhouse	Mercer
P	Tim Werkin	Mercer
C	Lawrence Walter	Mercer
INF	Derrell Baker	Georgia Southern
INF	Dave Jedneski	Mercer
INF	Mickey Lezcano	Georgia Southern
INF	Wayne Ryle	Mercer
OF	Frank Millerd	Mercer
OF	David Coss	Centenary
OF	Mark Beale	Hardin–Simmons
OF	Tim Smith	Mercer
