= Dave Jarvis =

American baseball coach

Current position
- Title: Head coach
- Team: Belmont
- Conference: Missouri Valley
- Record: 810–778–2

Biographical details
- Born: March 24, 1959 (age 67); Denver, Colorado, U.S.

Playing career
- 1979–1980: Three Rivers
- 1981–1982: Arkansas State
- Position: C

Coaching career (HC unless noted)
- 1985–1993: Three Rivers
- 1994–1997: Murray State (Asst.)
- 1998–present: Belmont

Head coaching record
- Overall: 810–778–2 (NCAA) 324–152 (NJCAA)
- Tournaments: NCAA: 2–4

Accomplishments and honors

Championships
- 2× Atlantic Sun Tournament (2011, 2012); Atlantic Sun Regular Season (2012)

David Jarvis (born March 24, 1959) is an American college baseball coach, currently serving as head coach of the Belmont Bruins baseball team. He was named to that position prior to the 1998 season.

== Playing career ==
Jarvis played collegiately at Three Rivers Community College for two years before completing his eligibility at Arkansas State. He was primarily a catcher, and also played a short semi-pro career before turning to coaching. In 1985, he earned a master's degree at Arkansas State.

== Coaching career ==
Three Rivers made Jarvis their head coach in 1985. He remained with the Raiders for nine seasons, amassing a record of 324–152 at the junior college. The program was consistently ranked under Jarvis, and he was named a three time Midwest Community College Athletic Conference Coach of the Year. In 1994, Jarvis made the jump to Division I, serving as an assistant at Murray State, with responsibilities for hitters and catchers, and helping in recruiting the junior college ranks. While at Belmont, he led the program into the NCAA and from the Atlantic Sun Conference to the Ohio Valley Conference. The Bruins claimed A-Sun conference titles in 2011 and 2012, and appeared in the NCAA Regional Final against Vanderbilt in 2011.

== Head coaching record ==
This table shows Jarvis' record as a head coach at the Division I level.

Record table
Season	Team	Overall	Conference	Standing	Postseason
Three Rivers () (1985–1993)
Three Rivers:		324–152 NJCAA			
Belmont Bruins () (1998–1999)
1998	Belmont	23–21–1			
1999	Belmont	28–24			
Belmont:					
Belmont Bruins (Independent) (2000–2001)
2000	Belmont	27–25			
2001	Belmont	30–23			
Belmont (Ind.):					
Belmont Bruins (Atlantic Sun Conference) (2002–2012)
2002	Belmont	22–30	9–20	T-10th (11)	
2003	Belmont	29–23	19–14	4th (12)	
2004	Belmont	31–23	13–17	7th (12)	
2005	Belmont	28–26	12–18	9th (11)	
2006	Belmont	24–31	11–19	10th (11)	
2007	Belmont	34–26	16–11	3rd (10)	A-Sun tournament (Note: The top six finishers of the A-Sun's eight eligible teams qualified for the Tournament in 2007.)
2008	Belmont	25–33	16–17	7th (12)	A-Sun tournament (Note: The top six finishers of the A-Sun's eight eligible teams qualified for the Tournament in 2008.)
2009	Belmont	29–29	15–15	6th (11)	A-Sun tournament (Note: The top six finishers of the A-Sun's seven eligible teams qualified for the Tournament in 2009.)
2010	Belmont	27–27	13–13	7th (11)	
2011	Belmont	38–26	17–13	6th (11)	NCAA Regional
2012	Belmont	39–24	17–11	1st (10)	NCAA Regional
Belmont (A-Sun):			158-168		
Belmont Bruins (Ohio Valley Conference) (2013–2022)
2013	Belmont	38–20	22–8	3rd (11)	OVC tournament (Note: The top six finishers of the OVC's eleven teams qualified for the Tournament in 2013.)
2014	Belmont	24–30–1	13–16–1	9th (11)	
2015	Belmont	29–29	15–15	5th	OVC tournament
2016	Belmont	33–27	17–13	T-4th	OVC tournament
2017	Belmont	31–29	17–13	T-3rd	OVC tournament
2018	Belmont	19–36	11–19	9th	
2019	Belmont	27–30	18–12	4th	OVC tournament
2020	Belmont	14–3	3–0		Season canceled due to COVID-19
2021	Belmont	22–30	14–16	T-7th	
2022	Belmont	39–20	18–6	1st	OVC tournament
Belmont:		710–645–2	148–118–1		
Belmont Bruins (Missouri Valley Conference) (2023–present)
2023	Belmont	27–33	10–17	T-7th	MVC tournament
2024	Belmont	26–32	12–15	7th	MVC tournament
2025	Belmont	26–34	13–14	6th	MVC tournament
2026	Belmont	21–34	11–13	7th	
Belmont:		810–778–2	46–59		
Total:		810–778–2			
National champion Postseason invitational champion Conference regular season champion Conference regular season and conference tournament champion Division regular season champion Division regular season and conference tournament champion Conference tournament champion

== See also ==
- List of current NCAA Division I baseball coaches
