= 1983 Trans America Athletic Conference baseball tournament =

American college baseball tournament

- Teams: 8
- Format: Double-elimination
- Finals site: Centenary Park; Shreveport, Louisiana
- Champions: Mercer (3rd title)
- Winning coach: Barry Myers (3rd title)

1983 Trans America Athletic Conference baseball standings
	Conf.						Overall
Team	W		L		T	PCT	W		L		T	PCT
Georgia Southern ‍‍‍	0	–	0	–	0	–	38	–	24	–	0	.613
Nicholls State ‍‍‍	0	–	0	–	0	–	38	–	24	–	0	.613
Arkansas–Little Rock ‍‍‍	0	–	0	–	0	–	23	–	20	–	1	.534
Mercer ‍‍‡‍	0	–	0	–	0	–	29	–	26	–	1	.527
Northwestern State ‍‍‍	0	–	0	–	0	–	26	–	30	–	0	.464
Centenary ‍‍‍	0	–	0	–	0	–	18	–	22	–	0	.450
Hardin–Simmons ‍‍‍	0	–	0	–	0	–	22	–	27	–	0	.449
Samford ‍‍‍	0	–	0	–	0	–	4	–	37	–	0	.098
‡ – Tournament champion y – Invited to the NCAA tournament As of June 30, 1983; Rankings from Collegiate Baseball

The 1983 Trans America Athletic Conference baseball tournament was held at Centenary Park on the campus of Centenary College of Louisiana in Shreveport, Louisiana, from May 2 through 4. This was the fifth tournament championship held by the Trans America Athletic Conference, in its fifth year of existence. Mercer won their third tournament championship.

== Format ==
The teams played an 8-team double-elimination tournament, involving all teams in the conference.

== Bracket ==
Upper round 1	Upper round 2	Upper final	Final
Nicholls State	21
Samford	2
Nicholls State	2
Arkansas–Little Rock	3
Arkansas–Little Rock	8
Northwestern State	4
Arkansas–Little Rock	5
Mercer	17
Mercer	8
Georgia Southern	6
Mercer	21
Hardin–Simmons	4
Hardin–Simmons	8
Centenary	7	Mercer	16	—
Arkansas–Little Rock	4	—
Lower round 1	Lower round 2	Lower round 3	Lower final
Hardin–Simmons	3
Samford	1	Northwestern State	7	Arkansas–Little Rock	8
Northwestern State	9	Northwestern State	5	Georgia Southern	7
Georgia Southern	6
Nicholls State	4
Georgia Southern	13	Georgia Southern	9
Centenary	9

== All-Tournament Team ==
The following players were named to the All-Tournament Team. No MVP was named until 1985.

POS	Player	School
P	Larry Hinson	Arkansas–Little Rock
P	Billy Brooks	Georgia Southern
C	Wayne Rathbun	Centenary
1B	Brian Perry	Arkansas–Little Rock
2B	Jim Kubik	Centenary
SS	Dave Reynolds	Northwestern State
3B	Jack Pool	Mercer
OF	Gil Herndon	Northwestern State
OF	Alan Balcomb	Georgia Southern
OF	Tim Smith	Mercer
DH	Steve Peruso	Georgia Southern
