= 2014 Atlantic Sun Conference baseball tournament =

American college baseball tournament

- Teams: 8
- Format: Double-elimination
- Finals site: Swanson Stadium; Fort Myers, FL
- Champions: Kennesaw State (1st title)
- Winning coach: Mike Sansing (1st title)
- MVP: Brennan Morgan (Kennesaw State)

2014 Atlantic Sun Conference baseball standings
	Conf.				Overall
Team	W		L	PCT	W		L	PCT
Florida Gulf Coast ‍†‍‍	19	–	8	.704	39	–	22	.639
Mercer ‍‍‍	18	–	9	.667	38	–	17	.691
No. 13 Kennesaw State ‍‍‡‍^{y}	17	–	9	.654	40	–	24	.625
Lipscomb ‍‍‍	17	–	10	.630	33	–	28	.541
East Tennessee State ‍‍‍	13	–	13	.500	27	–	30	.474
Jacksonville ‍‍‍	13	–	13	.500	21	–	33	.389
Stetson ‍‍‍	13	–	14	.481	26	–	34	.433
North Florida ‍‍‍	11	–	16	.407	22	–	31	.415
USC Upstate ‍‍‍	6	–	20	.231	17	–	38	.309
Northern Kentucky ‍‍‍	6	–	21	.222	14	–	37	.275
† – Conference champion ‡ – Tournament champion y – Invited to the NCAA tournament As of June 8, 2014; Rankings from Collegiate Baseball

The 2014 Atlantic Sun Conference baseball tournament was held at Swanson Stadium on the campus of Florida Gulf Coast University in Fort Myers, Florida, from May 21 through 25. Kennesaw State won their first tournament championship and claimed the Atlantic Sun Conference's automatic bid to the 2014 NCAA Division I baseball tournament.

== Format and seeding ==
The 2014 tournament was an 8-team double-elimination tournament. The top eight teams (based on conference results) from the conference earned invites to the tournament. Northern Kentucky was not eligible for the tournament as it is reclassifying from Division II.

Team	W	L	Pct	GB	Seed
Florida Gulf Coast	19	8	.704	–	1
Mercer	18	9	.667	1	2
Kennesaw State	17	9	.654	1.5	3
Lipscomb	17	10	.630	2	4
Jacksonville	13	13	.500	5.5	5
East Tennessee State	13	13	.500	5.5	6
Stetson	13	14	.481	6	7
North Florida	11	16	.407	8	8
USC Upstate	6	20	.231	12.5	–
Northern Kentucky	6	21	.222	13	–

== Bracket and results ==
First round
1	Florida Gulf Coast	5
8	North Florida	3
4	Lipscomb	2*
5	Jacksonville	1
8	North Florida	6
5	Jacksonville	7*
3	Kennesaw State	11*
6	East Tennessee State	7
2	Mercer	5
7	Stetson	7*
6	East Tennessee State	7
2	Mercer	1

Second round
1	Florida Gulf Coast	4
4	Lipscomb	5
1	Florida Gulf Coast	3
5	Jacksonville	0
3	Kennesaw State	7
7	Stetson	5
6	East Tennessee State	2
7	Stetson	5

Semifinals
4	Lipscomb	5	11
1	Florida Gulf Coast	10	4
3	Kennesaw State	2	–
7	Stetson	1	–

Final
4	Lipscomb	1
3	Kennesaw State	7

* - Indicates game required extra innings.

== All-Tournament Team ==
The following players were named to the All=Tournament Team.

Name	School
Brennan Morgan	Kennesaw State
Bo Way	Kennesaw State
Brennan Morgan	Kennesaw State
Max Pentecost	Kennesaw State
Grant Massey	Lipscomb
Ian Martinez-McGraw	Lipscomb
Nick Rivera	Florida Gulf Coast
Jack English	Florida Gulf Coast
Jordan Sanford	East Tennessee State
Jeremy Taylor	East Tennessee State
Taylor Cockrell	Stetson

=== Most Valuable Player ===
Brennan Morgan was named Tournament Most Valuable Player. Morgan was a sophomore designated hitter for Kennesaw State. He tallied nine hits and seven RBI for a .642 average over the Owls' four games.
