= 2016 Atlantic Sun Conference baseball tournament =

American college baseball tournament

- Teams: 6
- Format: Double-elimination
- Finals site: Ken Dugan Field at Stephen Lee Marsh Stadium; Nashville, Tennessee
- Champions: Stetson (7th title)
- Winning coach: Pete Dunn (7th title)
- MVP: Cory Reid (Stetson)

2016 Atlantic Sun Conference baseball standings
	Conf.				Overall
Team	W		L	PCT	W		L	PCT
Kennesaw State ‍†‍‍	17	–	4	.810	29	–	27	.518
North Florida ‍‍‍	15	–	6	.714	39	–	19	.672
Jacksonville ‍‍‍	14	–	7	.667	33	–	22	.600
Lipscomb ‍‍‍	12	–	9	.571	31	–	27	.534
Stetson ‍‍‡‍^{y}	9	–	12	.429	29	–	31	.483
Florida Gulf Coast ‍‍‍	9	–	12	.429	27	–	32	.458
USC Upstate ‍‍‍	5	–	15	.250	22	–	30	.423
NJIT ‍‍‍	2	–	18	.100	17	–	36	.321
† – Conference champion ‡ – Tournament champion y – Invited to the NCAA tournament As of June 30, 2016; Rankings from Collegiate Baseball

The 2016 Atlantic Sun Conference baseball tournament was held at Ken Dugan Field at Stephen Lee Marsh Stadium on the campus of Lipscomb University in Nashville, Tennessee, from May 25 through 28. Sixth-seeded Stetson won their seventh tournament championship and claimed the Atlantic Sun Conference's automatic bid to the 2016 NCAA Division I baseball tournament.

== Format and seeding ==
The 2016 tournament was a double-elimination tournament in which the top six of the conference's eight members participated. Seeds were determined based on conference winning percentage from the round-robin regular season.

Team	W	L	Pct	GB	Seed
Kennesaw State	17	4	.810	—	1
North Florida	15	6	.714	2	2
Jacksonville	14	7	.667	3	3
Lipscomb	12	9	.571	5	4
Florida Gulf Coast	9	12	.429	8	5
Stetson	9	12	.429	8	6
USC Upstate	5	15	.250	11.5	—
NJIT	2	18	.100	14.5	—

== Bracket and results ==
First round
1	Kennesaw State	7
6	Stetson	13
2	North Florida	12
5	Florida Gulf Coast	6
3	Jacksonville	8
4	Lipscomb	10

Second round
6	Stetson	9
3	Jacksonville	7
2	North Florida	1
4	Lipscomb	0
1	Kennesaw State	0
5	Florida Gulf Coast	6

Third round
6	Stetson	7
2	North Florida	6
5	Florida Gulf Coast	8
4	Lipscomb	6

Semifinals
2	North Florida	2
5	Florida Gulf Coast	3

Final
6	Stetson	5	—
5	Florida Gulf Coast	4	—

== All-Tournament Team ==
The following players were named to the All-Tournament Team.

Name	Team
Garrett Anderson	FGCU
Kyle Brooks	North Florida
John Fussell	Stetson
Austin Hale	Stetson
Matt Reardon	FGCU
Cory Reid	Stetson
Kirk Sidwell	Stetson
Lee Solomon	Lipscomb
Tevin Symonette	Lipscomb
Vance Vizcaino	Stetson

=== Most Valuable Player ===
Cory Reid was named Tournament Most Valuable Player. Reid was a third baseman for Stetson who drove in 8 runs and recorded six extra base hits for the tournament.
