= Terry Alexander (baseball) =

American baseball coach

Terry Alexander (born April 15, 1955 in Marietta, Georgia) is the current hitting coach of the Bristol Pirates and previously served as head coach of Jacksonville University's baseball team from 1991 to 2013. He was the school's most successful and longest-tenured head coach, compiling a record of 713-590-2 record in 22 seasons.

He served as assistant coach of Jacksonville University from 1980 to 1990. In 2002, he was assistant coach for the USA national baseball team, which won Haarlem Baseball Week and won silver at the World University Baseball Championship.

He signed with the Pittsburgh Pirates out of Florida State University in 1978, but did not play at that level due to a back injury.
