= Swanson Stadium =

Baseball park in Fort Myers, Florida

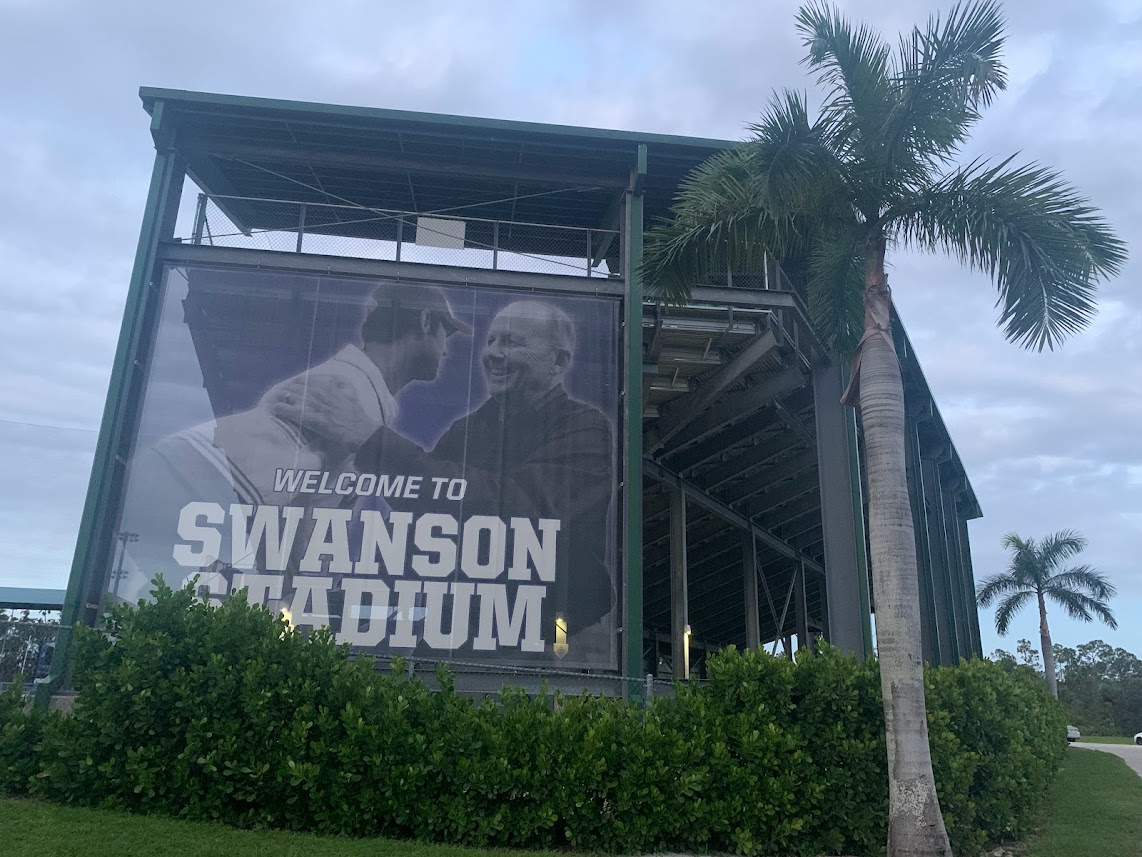
- Interactive map of Swanson Stadium
- Location: Fort Myers, Florida
- Coordinates: 26°28′13″N 81°45′48″W
- Owner: Florida Gulf Coast University
- Operator: Florida Gulf Coast University
- Capacity: 1,500
- Surface: Natural Grass
- Field size: Left Field: 330 feet (101 m); Center Field: 397 feet (121 m); Right Field: 330 feet (101 m)

Construction
- Opened: February 2, 2004

Tenant
- FGCU Eagles Baseball

Swanson Stadium is a baseball park located on the campus of Florida Gulf Coast University in Fort Myers, Florida, next to Alico Arena, the school's basketball facility.

Opened in 2004, the stadium was renamed in 2005 for Duane and Cookie Swanson, local civic leaders and FGCU supporters.

== See also ==
- List of NCAA Division I baseball venues
