= North Florida Ospreys baseball =

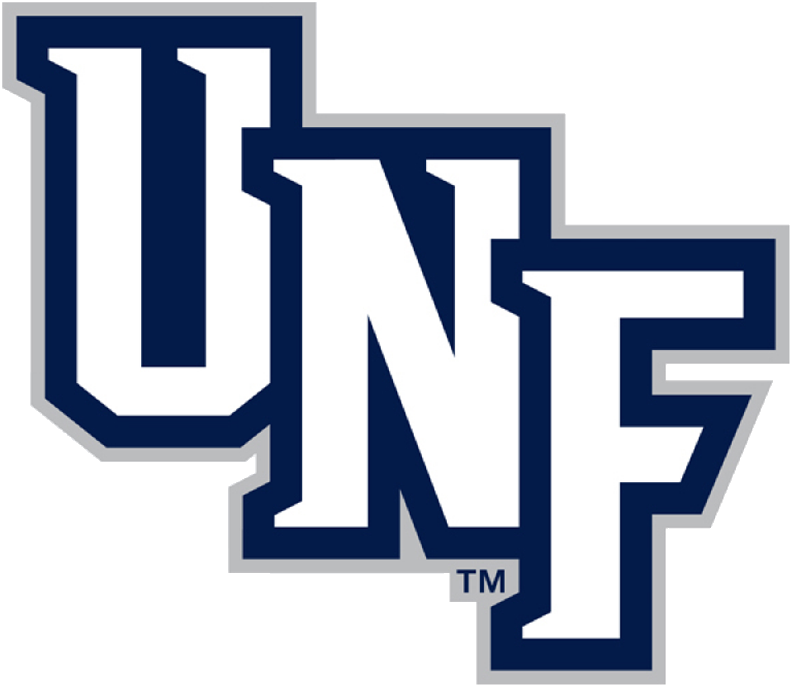
- Founded: 1988; 38 years ago
- University: University of North Florida
- Head coach: Joe Mercadante (3rd season)
- Conference: ASUN; Graphite Division
- Location: Jacksonville, Florida
- Home stadium: Harmon Stadium (capacity: 1,000)
- Nickname: Ospreys
- Colors: Navy blue and gray

College World Series runner-up
- Division II: 2005

College World Series appearances
- NAIA: 1989, 1991; Division II: 2000, 2001, 2005

NCAA tournament appearances
- Division II: 1994, 1995, 1997, 1999, 2000, 2001, 2002, 2003, 2004, 2005

Conference regular season champions
- Division I: 2015; Division II: 1995, 1999, 2000, 2001, 2004, 2005

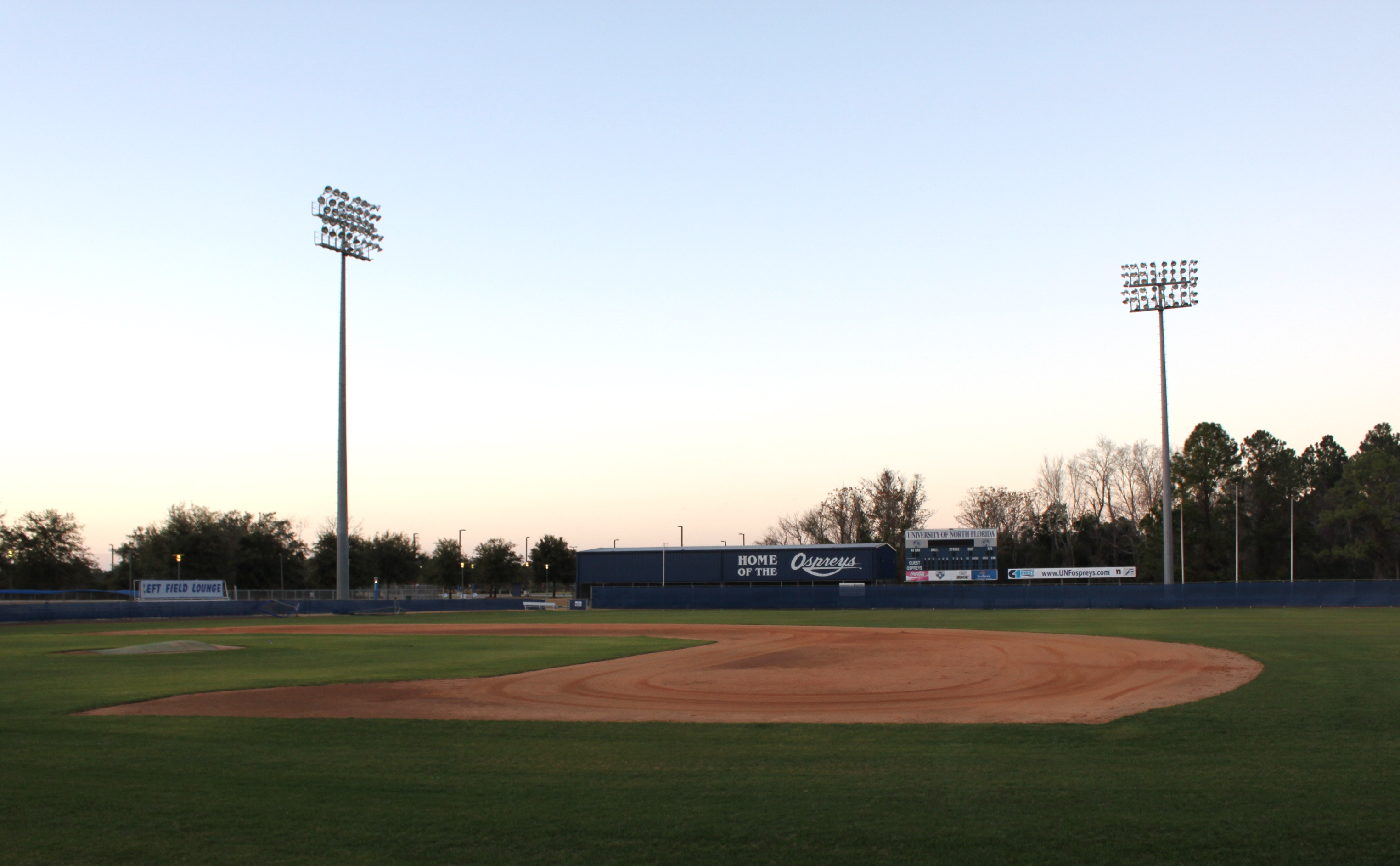
Harmon Stadium

The North Florida Ospreys baseball team represents the University of North Florida in the sport of baseball. The Ospreys compete in Division I of the National Collegiate Athletic Association (NCAA), in the ASUN Conference (A-Sun). They play their home games in Harmon Stadium on the university's Jacksonville, Florida campus. The Ospreys were founded in 1988 as members of the NAIA. They moved to the NCAA Division II level in 1994, and began their Division I transition in 2006. They became fully eligible at the Division I level in 2010. The Ospreys won their first Atlantic Sun regular season championship in 2015.

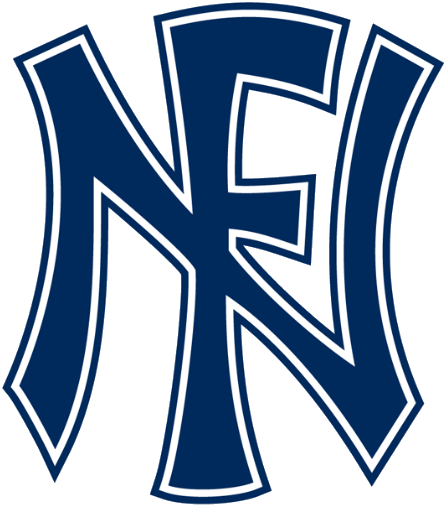
Baseball logo (1988-2010)

== History ==
North Florida's baseball program was founded in 1988. The team was established under the leadership of Dusty Rhodes, who served as head coach from 1988 to 2010. Since its inception, the Ospreys baseball team has won 13 conference titles: six in the NAIA, six in NCAA Division II, and one in NCAA Division I and has made a total of 16 playoff appearances: six in the NAIA and ten in NCAA Division II. They went to the NAIA World Series in 1989 and 1991 and the NCAA Division II World Series in 2000, 2001, and 2005, advancing to the final in 2005.

Notably, the team's former logo is similar to the New York Yankees logo. It was designed in 1986 at the urging of Dusty Rhodes and continued, and brought extra attention to the baseball program. It was discontinued after Rhodes' retirement in 2010 and replaced with a new logo for the 2011 season.

The Ospreys won their first Atlantic Sun regular season championship in 2015. Star outfielder Donnie Dewees, a redshirt sophomore, was named Atlantic Sun Player of the Year and Laval was the conference's Coach of the Year. Dewees led the nation in runs (81), runs per game (1.51), hits (101) and total bases (178) at the conclusion of the regular season and posted a 31-game hit streak. Dewees was also named one of 21 semifinalists for the Golden Spikes Award. The Chicago Cubs selected Dewees in the second round, with the 47th overall selection, of the draft. He was UNF's highest-drafted player since they transitioned to Division I in 2005.

== Facilities ==
The Ospreys play their home games on campus at Harmon Stadium. It was built in 1988 and has a seating capacity of 1,000. The playing field and batting facility are named for former Ospreys baseball coach Dusty Rhodes. On Feb. 13, 2026, UNF unveiled its new AstroTurf Diamond Series baseball field, and a newly padded outfield wall.

== Head coaches ==
Baseball head coaches	Seasons
Dusty Rhodes	1988–2010
Smoke Laval	2011–2017
Tim Parenton	2018–2023
Joe Mercadante	2024–

== Year-by-year results ==
College World Series appearance	NCAA Tournament appearance	Conference regular season champions	Conference tournament champions	Conference regular season and tournament champions

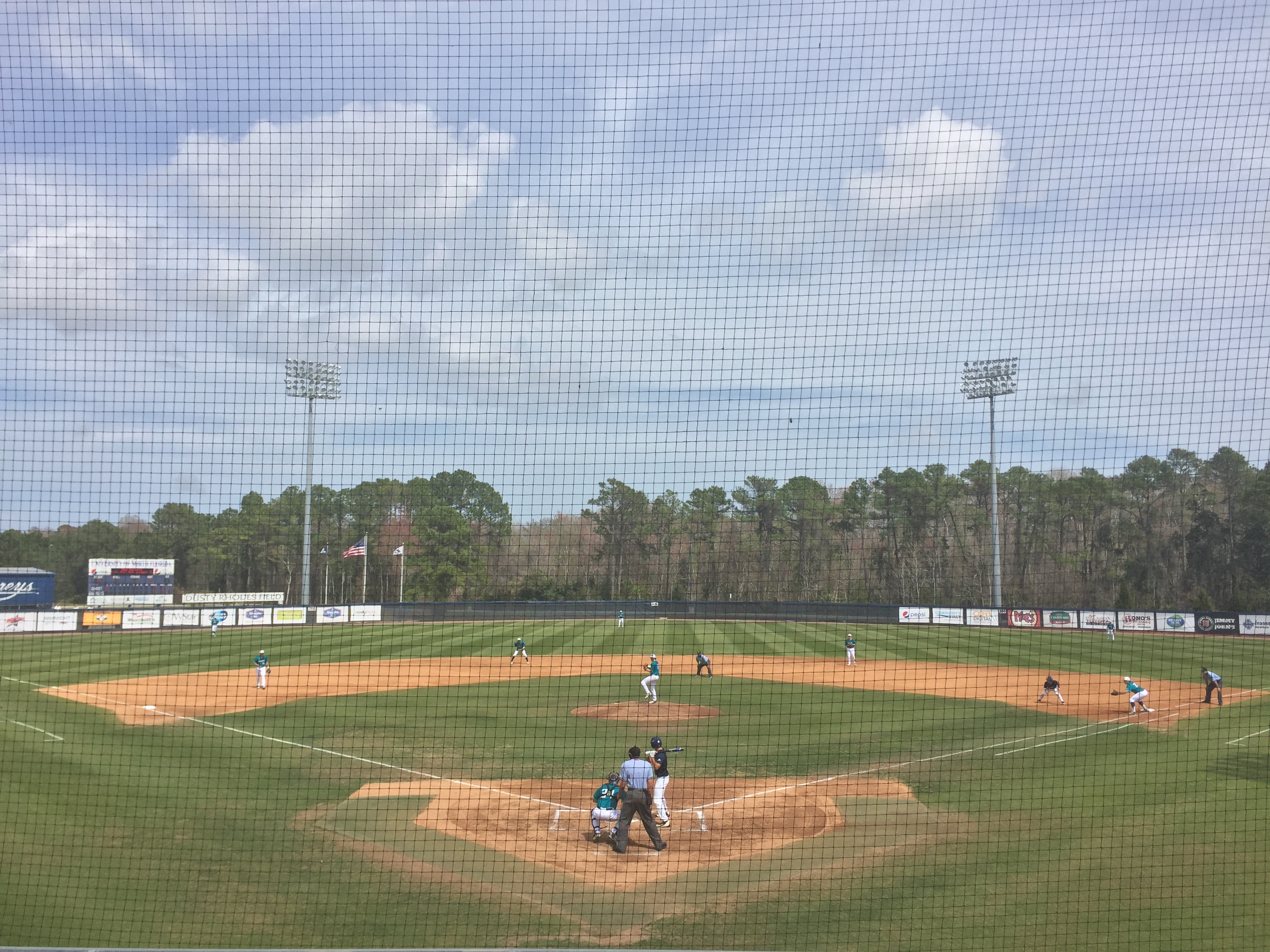
The Ospreys at home versus UNC Wilmington in 2016.

Season	Head coach	Overall	Conference	Standing	Postseason
District 25 (NAIA)
1988	Dusty Rhodes	47–17	18–6	1st	Area V Tournament, 1–2
1989	Dusty Rhodes	53–18	25–3	1st	NAIA World Series, 3rd place
1990	Dusty Rhodes	43–20	19–3	1st	District 25 Tournament, 2–2
1991	Dusty Rhodes	57–13	23–1	1st	NAIA World Series, 3rd place
1992	Dusty Rhodes	51–12	27–3	1st	Area V Tournament, 2–1
District 7 (NAIA)
1993	Dusty Rhodes	45–12	28–4	1st	District 7 Tournament, 1–2
NAIA Total:		296–92 (.763)	140–20 (.875)		
Sunshine State Conference (NCAA Division II)
1994	Dusty Rhodes	33–19	15–6	2nd	NCAA South Regional, 1–2
1995	Dusty Rhodes	36–16	15–6	1st	NCAA South Regional, 0–2
1996	Dusty Rhodes	26–29	10–11	4th	
1997	Dusty Rhodes	39–17	13–8	3rd	NCAA South Regional, 0–2
Sunshine State Total:		134–81 (.623)	53–31 (.631)		
Peach Belt Conference (NCAA Division II)
1998	Dusty Rhodes	32–21	15–11	2nd	
1999	Dusty Rhodes	43–17	22–8	1st	NCAA South Atlantic Regional, 3–2
2000	Dusty Rhodes	49–14	26–4	1st	D-II World Series, 3rd place
2001	Dusty Rhodes	47–17	25–5	1st	D-II World Series, 3rd place
2002	Dusty Rhodes	40–16	23–7	2nd	NCAA South Atlantic Regional, 0–2
2003	Dusty Rhodes	39–18	18–9	T-1st	NCAA South Atlantic Regional, 2–2
2004	Dusty Rhodes	41–18	23–7	1st	NCAA South Atlantic Regional, 2–2
2005	Dusty Rhodes	48–16	23–7	1st	D-II World Series, runner-up
Peach Belt Total:		339–137 (.712)	175–58 (.751)		
ASUN Conference (NCAA Division I)
2006	Dusty Rhodes	34–21	20–10	2nd	
2007	Dusty Rhodes	24–32	13–14	6th	
2008	Dusty Rhodes	29–26	18–15	4th	
2009	Dusty Rhodes	23–31	15–15	T-6th	
2010	Dusty Rhodes	30–28	14–12	4th	A-Sun Tournament, 1–2
2011	Smoke Laval	27–27	13–17	8th	
2012	Smoke Laval	31–24	12–15	8th	
2013	Smoke Laval	40–19	18–9	3rd	A-Sun Tournament, 2–2
2014	Smoke Laval	22–31	11–16	8th	A-Sun Tournament, 0–2
2015	Smoke Laval	45–16	16–5	1st	A-Sun Tournament, 3–2 (Runner-up)
2016	Smoke Laval	39–19	15–6	2nd	A-Sun Tournament, 2–2
2017	Smoke Laval	33-24	12–9	4th	A-Sun Tournament, 0–2
2018	Tim Parenton	28-28	10–11	4th	A-Sun Tournament, 3–2
2019	Tim Parenton	32-25	12–11	5th	A-Sun Tournament, 1–2
2020	Tim Parenton	4-12	0–0		
2021	Tim Parenton	22-23	11–7	2nd (South)	A-Sun Tournament, 1–2
2022	Tim Parenton	22-33	11–18	5th (East)	A-Sun Tournament, 1–1
2023	Tim Parenton	28-27	13–17	11th	
2024	Joe Mercadante	21-30-1	11–17-1	9th	
2025	Joe Mercadante	27-29	15-15	4th (Graphite Division)	A-Sun Tournament, 0-2
2026	Joe Mercadante	31-24	22-8	1st (Graphite Division)	A-Sun Tournament, 0-2
Atlantic Sun Total:		534–476-1 (.529)	246–226-1 (.522)		
Total:		1,303–584 (.691)			

== Conference championships (regular season) ==
Season	Coach	Overall record	Conf. record
2015	Smoke Laval	45–16	16–5

== Awards ==
=== Conference awards ===
- Atlantic Sun Conference Coach of the Year

Smoke Laval (2015)
Joe Mercadante (2026)

- Atlantic Sun Conference Player of the Year

Donnie Dewees (2015)
