= Melching Field at Conrad Park =

Baseball stadium in DeLand, Florida

Coordinates: 29.019921°N 81.302097°W

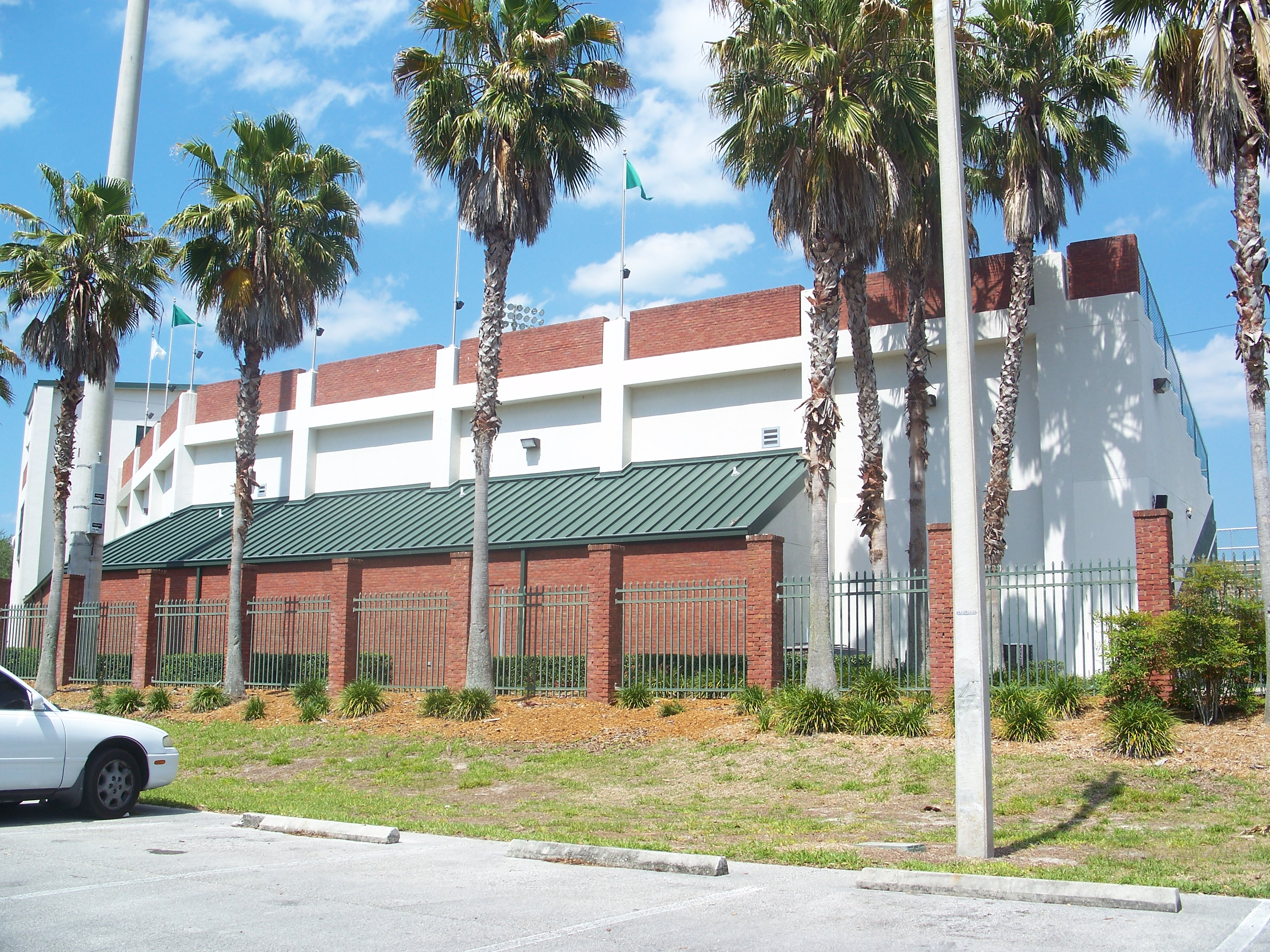
- Interactive map of Melching Field at Conrad Park
- Location: 555 S. Woodland Blvd. DeLand, Florida
- Capacity: 2,500
- Field size: Left Field: 335 ft Center Field: 403 ft Right Field: 335 ft

Construction
- Opened: February 12, 1999

Tenants
- Stetson Hatters baseball (NCAA D1 ASUN) (1999–present); Daytona Cubs (FSL) (2004; some games); DeLand Suns (FCSL) (2009–present); ASUN Tournament (1989, 1991, 1993, 1996–97, 2002–09, 2012, 2017, 2019, 2023–24)

Melching Field at Conrad Park is a baseball stadium located in DeLand, Florida. The primary tenant of Melching Field is the Stetson University Hatters college baseball team, a Division I program playing in the ASUN Conference.

== Features ==
Melching Field features 2,500 chair and benchback seats, with room for approximately 500 more spectators in a grass berm area along the first base foul line. The partially covered grandstand includes a large press box with two radio broadcast booths, a television broadcast booth, a media area, and two luxury boxes. The lower section of seating between the first and third base dugouts features chair-back box seats, while the upper section features bench-back seating. Underneath the grandstand, fans can find a full-service concession area and restrooms.

Player amenities include home and visiting locker rooms, coaches' offices and a covered batting cage area. The field itself features natural grass and symmetrical outfield dimensions. An electronic scoreboard is located beyond the left field fence.

== History ==
The ballpark is named for R. Dale Melching, a Stetson alumnus and donor who represented the United States national baseball team at the 1942 Amateur World Series in Havana, Cuba. Prior to the ballpark's opening in 1999, the previous home of the Stetson Hatters baseball team, Conrad Park, was located on the same site, with home plate then located where center field now exists in Melching Field. Conrad Park was the home of spring training games during the 1940s and 1950s, as well as the home of the DeLand Red Hats of the Florida State League.

Melching Field opened on February 12, 1999, where a crowd of 2,874 saw the Stetson Hatters defeat the University of Louisville 4–3. Since that time, over 250,000 fans have witnessed Hatters baseball at Melching Field, including 49,200 fans in 2005 (which was the 32nd highest attendance in all of NCAA baseball, despite the fact Stetson is a smaller school of less than 3,000 undergraduates.)

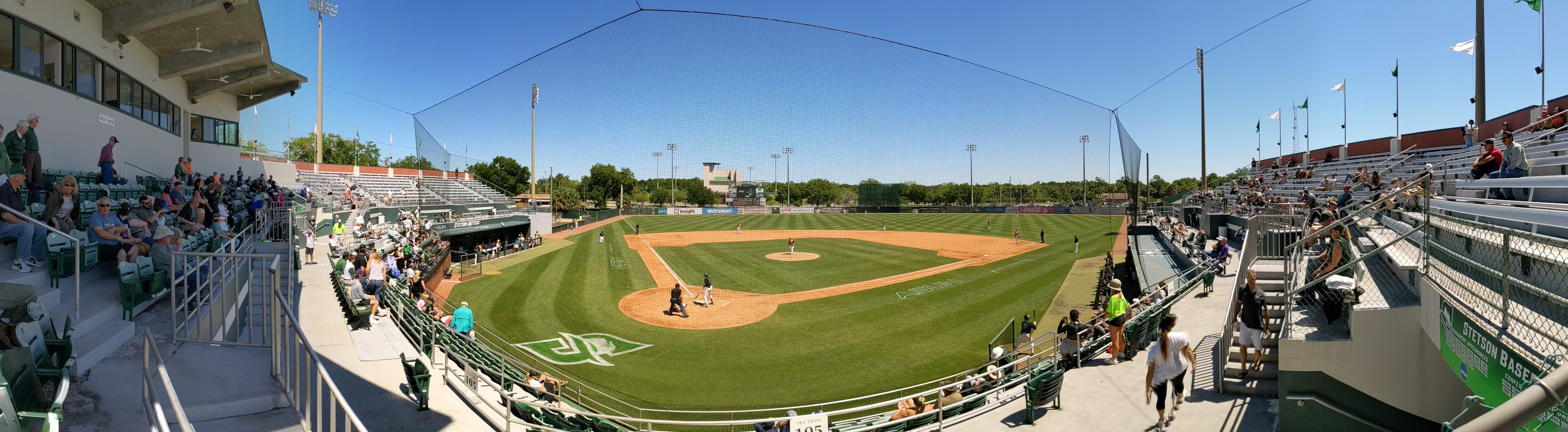
Stetson hosting Kennesaw State (April 10, 2022)

== Secondary tenants ==
Besides Hatters baseball, Melching Field has also hosted a number of Atlantic Sun Conference baseball tournaments (1989, 1991, 1993, 1996–97, 2002–09, 2012), along with high school and amateur tournaments. Several Daytona Cubs games in 2004 after the Cubs home ballpark, Jackie Robinson Ballpark, was damaged in Hurricane Charley. Beginning in 2009, the field has hosted home games of the DeLand Suns, a collegiate summer baseball team and member of the Florida Collegiate Summer League.

In 2018, for the first time, Melching Field hosted a Regional round in the NCAA Baseball tournament. The host team from Stetson University ultimately won the round and advanced to its first-ever Super Regional round appearance.

== See also ==
- List of NCAA Division I baseball venues
