= Florida Gulf Coast Eagles baseball =

Collegiate baseball team

Florida Gulf Coast Eagles
- 2026 Florida Gulf Coast Eagles baseball team
- Founded: 2003
- Overall record: 599–348–3
- University: Florida Gulf Coast University
- Head coach: Dave Tollett (24th season)
- Conference: Atlantic Sun Conference; Graphite Division
- Location: Fort Myers, Florida
- Home stadium: Swanson Stadium (capacity: 1,500)
- Nickname: Eagles
- Colors: Cobalt blue and emerald green

NCAA tournament appearances
- 2006, 2007, 2017

Conference tournament champions
- 2017, 2025

Conference regular season champions
- 2008, 2009, 2010, 2014, 2019, 2024

The Florida Gulf Coast Eagles baseball team represents Florida Gulf Coast University in the sport of baseball. The Eagles team competes in the National Collegiate Athletic Association (NCAA) and the ASUN Conference (A-SUN). Florida Gulf Coast has fielded a baseball team since 2003 and, as of 2019, has an all-time record of 599–348–3 (a .631 winning percentage). The Eagles play in Swanson Stadium in Fort Myers, Florida, which has a capacity of 1,500.

FGCU has several former baseball players playing in the minor leagues, and has three MLB pitchers: Chris Sale (Boston Red Sox), Richard Bleier (Boston Red Sox and Team Israel), and Jacob Barnes (Los Angeles Angels).

== Florida Gulf Coast in the NCAA Tournament ==
Year	Record	Pct	Notes
2017	1–2	.333	Chapel Hill Regional
TOTALS	1–2	.333	
