= Mercer Bears baseball =

Mercer Bears
- 2026 Mercer Bears baseball team
- Founded: 1871
- University: Mercer University
- Athletic director: Jim Cole
- Head coach: Craig Gibson (23rd season)
- Conference: Southern Conference
- Location: Macon, Georgia
- Home stadium: OrthoGeorgia Park (capacity: 1,500)
- Nickname: Bears
- Colors: Black and orange

NCAA tournament appearances
- 2010, 2013, 2015, 2019

Conference tournament champions
- A-Sun: 1979, 1981, 1983, 2010; SoCon: 2015, 2019

Conference regular season champions
- Dixie: 1952; A-Sun: 1982, 1994, 1997, 2013; SoCon: 2015, 2016, 2017, 2026

For information on all Mercer University sports, see Mercer Bears

The Mercer Bears baseball program is the intercollegiate baseball team of Mercer University located in Macon, Georgia, United States. The team competes in the NCAA Division I and is a member of the Southern Conference. The Bears are coached by Craig Gibson.

== Mercer in the NCAA Tournament ==
Year	Record	Pct	Regional
2010	1–2	.333	Atlanta Regional
2013	0–2	.000	Starkville Regional
2015	0–2	.000	Tallahassee Regional
2019	0–2	.000	Athens Regional
Totals	1-8	.111	
