= Belmont Bruins baseball =

- 2026 Belmont Bruins baseball team
- Founded: 1954; 72 years ago
- University: Belmont University
- Head coach: Dave Jarvis (29th season)
- Conference: Missouri Valley Conference
- Location: Nashville, Tennessee
- Home stadium: E. S. Rose Park (Capacity: 750)
- Nickname: Bruins
- Colors: Navy, white, and red

NCAA tournament appearances
- 2011, 2012

Conference tournament champions
- VSAC: 1975, 1976, 1977, 1979; A-Sun: 2011, 2012

Conference regular season champions
- A-Sun: 2012; OVC: 2022

The Belmont Bruins baseball team (formerly the Belmont Rebels) is a varsity intercollegiate athletic team of Belmont University in Nashville, Tennessee, United States. The team is a member of the Missouri Valley Conference, which is part of the National Collegiate Athletic Association's Division I. The team plays its home games at E. S. Rose Park in Nashville. The Bruins are coached by Dave Jarvis.

== Belmont in the NCAA Tournament ==
Year	Record	Pct	Notes
2011	2–2	.500	Nashville Regional
2012	0–2	.000	Baton Rouge Regional
TOTALS	2–4	.333	

== Year-by-year results ==
Statistics overview
Season	Coach	Overall	Conference	Standing	Postseason
Volunteer State Athletic Conference (1954–1984)
1954	Larry Striplin	3–8			
1956	W.C. Griffith	2–5			
1957	Harold Boguskie	10–7			
1962	—	8–10			
1963	Ken Sidwell	15–13			
1966	—	8–8			
1967	—	7–7			
1968	Dewey Jones	2–16			
1969	—	15–19			
1970	Dave Whitten	18–17			
1971	Dave Whitten	12–18			
1974	Dave Whitten	23–12			
1975	Dave Whitten	31–9			
1976	Dave Whitten	31–11			
1977	Dave Whitten	29–13			
1978	Dave Whitten	23–12			
1979	Dave Whitten	28–12			
1980	Dave Whitten	23–12			
1981	Dave Whitten	22–11			
1982	Dave Whitten	26–12			
1983	Dave Whitten	12–30			
1984	Dave Whitten	17–18–1			
Tennessee Collegiate Athletic Conference (1985–1995)
1985	Dave Whitten	25–22–1			
1986	Dave Whitten	22–19			
1987	Dave Whitten	19–19–1			
1988	Dave Whitten	23–19			
1989	Dave Whitten	31–24			
1990	Dave Whitten	28–12			
1991	Dave Whitten	25–16			
1992	Dave Whitten	25–20			
1993	Dave Whitten	20–18			
1994	Dave Whitten	25–12			
1995	Dave Whitten	28–15			
Independent (1996–1997)
1996	Dave Whitten	21–17			
1997	Dave Whitten	31–17			
Division I Independent (1998–2001)
1998	Dave Jarvis	23–21–1			
1999	Dave Jarvis	28–24			
2000	Dave Jarvis	27–25			
2001	Dave Jarvis	30–23			
Atlantic Sun Conference (2002–2012)
2002	Dave Jarvis	22–30	9–20	11th	
2003	Dave Jarvis	29–23	19–14	4th	
2004	Dave Jarvis	31–23	13–17	7th	
2005	Dave Jarvis	28–26	12–18	9th	
2006	Dave Jarvis	24–31	11–19	10th	
2007	Dave Jarvis	34–26	16–11	3rd	
2008	Dave Jarvis	25–33	16–17	7th	
2009	Dave Jarvis	29–29	15–15	6th	
2010	Dave Jarvis	27–27	13–13	7th	
2011	Dave Jarvis	38–26	17–13	6th	
2012	Dave Jarvis	39–24	17–10	1st	
Ohio Valley Conference (2013–present)
2013	Dave Jarvis	38–20	22–8	3rd	
2014	Dave Jarvis	24–30–1	13–16–1	9th	
2015	Dave Jarvis	29–29	15–15	6th	
OVC:					
Total:					
National champion Postseason invitational champion Conference regular season champion Conference regular season and conference tournament champion Division regular season champion Division regular season and conference tournament champion Conference tournament champion

== Major League Baseball ==
Belmont has had 26 Major League Baseball draft selections since the draft began in 1965. The only players from Belmont to go on to play in the majors are Jerry Bell, Dwight Bernard, and Matt Beaty.

Bruins in the Major League Baseball Draft
Year	Player	Round	Team
1974	Dwight Bernard	2	Mets
1975	Michael Perkins	2	Cubs
1976	Larry Corr	20	Tigers
1976	Thomas Wright	18	Athletics
1979	Wilson Tucker	32	Tigers
1983	David Cram	22	Phillies
1989	Joe Seals	39	Dodgers
1991	Trace Ragland	53	Pirates
1993	Mike Lane	24	Orioles
2001	Jason Anderegg	19	Padres
2005	Blake Owen	6	Orioles
2007	Wilson Tucker	33	Royals
2007	Ben Petsch	19	Twins
2008	Derek Wiley	50	Athletics
2008	Carlo Testa	18	Royals
2009	Derek Wiley	31	Braves
2009	Daniel Wagner	16	White Sox
2010	Patrick Elkins	37	Cardinals
2013	Austin Coley	27	Mets
2013	Jared Breen	24	Orioles
2013	Chase Brookshire	20	Cardinals
2014	Jamie Ritchie	13	Astros
2014	Greg Brody	11	Giants
2014	Austin Coley	8	Pirates
2015	Drew Ferguson	19	Astros
2015	Matt Beaty	12	Dodgers

== See also ==
- List of NCAA Division I baseball programs
