= ASUN Conference baseball awards =

At the end of each regular season, the Atlantic Sun Conference, branded since the 2016–17 school year as the ASUN Conference, names major award winners in baseball. Currently, it names a Coach, Pitcher, Player, Freshman, and Defensive Player of the Year. The Coach of the Year award, which dates to 1979, is the oldest. The others—Player (1982), Freshman (2001), Pitcher (2004), and Defensive Player (2014)—were added later. Through the 2001 season, the then-existing awards were known as the major awards of the Trans America Athletic Conference, the ASUN's former name.

Through the end of the 2019 season, Stetson has won 29 major awards, the most of any school in the conference.

On six occasions, a team has won swept the major awards given out in a season: Mercer in 1983, Georgia Southern in 1986 and 1987, Stetson in 1989, Florida International in 1995, and Florida Atlantic in 1999. All six instances came before 2001, when only the Coach and Player of the Year awards existed.

Four individuals have won more than one of the awards. Mercer's Craig Gibson was named Player of the Year in 1985 and Coach of the Year in 2013; Mercer's Chesny Young was named Freshman of the Year in 2012 and Player of the Year in 2013; Jacksonville's Michael Baumann was Freshman of the Year and Pitcher of the Year in 2015; and Florida Gulf Coast's Jake Noll was Freshman of the Year in 2014 and Player of the Year in 2016.

== Coach of the Year ==
The conference's Coach of the Year award is presented annually to the conference's most outstanding baseball coach, as chosen by a vote of ASUN coaches taken at the end of the regular season. From 1979–1981 and 1987–1992, the award was given automatically to the coach of the TAAC's tournament champion, rather than chosen by the league's coaches.

The award was first presented in 1979. From 1979–2001, it was known as the Trans America Athletic Conference Coach of the Year award, until the conference switched to its current name for the 2002 season.

With the exception of 2012, the award has been given to the coach of the league's regular season champion in each season since 2004. In 2012, USC Upstate's Matt Fincher was given the award after his team, picked to finish last, finished second in the ASUN.

Stetson's Pete Dunn, who has coached in the conference since 1986, has won the award six times, the most of any coach. He is one of three coaches to win the award in three straight years (1988–1990), along with Georgia Southern's Jack Stallings (1985–1987) and Florida Gulf Coast's Dave Tollett (2008–2010).

=== Winners by season ===
Below is a table of the award's winners since it was first given out in 1979.

Season	Coach	School	Conf. (Rk.)	Overall
1979 (Note: In this season, the award was automatically given to the coach of the TAAC's tournament champion.)	Barry Myers	Mercer	N/A (Note: In this season, the TAAC consisted only of a postseason tournament.)	38–16
1980	Jack Stallings	Georgia Southern	N/A	38–21–1
1981	Barry Myers (2)	Mercer	3–4 (2nd, East)	39–12–1
1982	Larry Martindale	Hardin–Simmons	7–5 (T-1st, West)	23–32
1983	Barry Myers (3)	Mercer	N/A (Note: Records unavailable.) (4th)	29–26–1
1984	Mike Knight	Nicholls State	18–5 (1st, West)	38–21
1985	Jack Stallings (2)	Georgia Southern	14–3 (1st, East)	41–23
1986	Jack Stallings (3)	Georgia Southern	12–6 (1st, East)	36–23
1987	Jack Stallings (4)	Georgia Southern	13–5 (1st, East)	33–30
1988	Pete Dunn	Stetson	9–8 (2nd, East)	35–25
1989	Pete Dunn (2)	Stetson	13–5 (1st, East)	38–23
1990	Pete Dunn (3)	Stetson	10–8 (2nd, East)	33–31
1991	Danny Price	Florida International	11–7 (2nd, East)	43–23
1992	Greg Marten	Southeastern Louisiana	12–4 (T-1st, West)	38–22
1993	Greg Marten (2)	Southeastern Louisiana	19–5 (1st, West)	38–17
1994	Barry Myers (4)	Mercer	15–9 (T-1st, West)	32–24
1995	Danny Price (2)	Florida International	27–3 (1st)	50–11
1996	Pete Dunn (4)	Stetson	12–6 (1st, South)	42–23
1997	Rudy Abbott	Jacksonville State	14–4 (1st, West)	39–13
1998	Danny Price (3)	Florida International	15–5 (1st, South)	41–24
1999	Kevin Cooney	Florida Atlantic	26–4 (1st)	54–9
2000	Chip Smith	Campbell	12–15 (6th)	31–25
2001	Jay Bergman	UCF	22–5 (1st)	51–14
2002	Jay Bergman (2)	UCF	23–7 (1st)	41–22
2003	Dave Jarvis	Belmont	19–14 (T-3rd)	29–23
2004	Jay Bergman (3)	UCF	24–6 (1st)	47–18
2005	Bobby Pierce	Troy	23–7 (1st)	37–21
2006	Terry Alexander	Jacksonville	23–7 (1st)	43–19
2007	Pete Dunn (5)	Stetson	21–6 (1st)	42–21
2008	Dave Tollett	Florida Gulf Coast	25–8 (1st)	38–15
2009	Dave Tollett (2)	Florida Gulf Coast	23–7 (1st)	36–18
2010	Dave Tollett (3)	Florida Gulf Coast	25–5 (1st)	38–20
2011	Pete Dunn (6)	Stetson	23–7 (1st)	43–20
2012	Matt Fincher	USC Upstate	16–10 (2nd)	33–20
2013	Craig Gibson	Mercer	20–7 (1st)	43–18
2014	Dave Tollett (4)	Florida Gulf Coast	19–8 (1st)	39–22
2015	Smoke Laval	North Florida	16–5 (1st)	45–16
2016	Mike Sansing	Kennesaw State	17–4 (1st)	29–27
2017	Chris Hayes	Jacksonville	16–5 (1st)	36–24
2018	Steve Trimper	Stetson	15–3 (1st)	48–11
2019	Dave Tollett (5)	Florida Gulf Coast	16–7 (1st)	34–21
2021	Scott Jackson	Liberty	19–2 (1st)	41–16
2022	Jeff Forehand	Lipscomb	20–10 (T–1st)	35–23
2023	Jeff Forehand (2)	Lipscomb	23–7 (1st)	36–26
2024	Roland Fanning	Austin Peay	20–10 (T–1st)	35–21
2025	Roland Fanning (2)	Austin Peay	26–4 (1st)	45–14
2026	Joe Mercadante	North Florida	22–8 (1st, Graphite)	31–22

=== Winners by school ===
The following is a table of the schools whose coaches have won the award, along with the first season each school played baseball in the conference, the number of times it has won the award, and the years in which it has done so.

Because NCAA baseball is a spring sport, the first year of ASUN competition falls in the calendar year after each school formally joined the conference.

School (year joined)	Awards	Seasons
Stetson (1986)	7	1988, 1989, 1990, 1996, 2007, 2011, 2018
Florida Gulf Coast (2008)	5	2008, 2009, 2010, 2014, 2019
Mercer (1979) (Note: Following the 2014, Mercer left to join the Southern Conference.)	5	1979, 1981, 1983, 1994, 2013
Georgia Southern (1979) (Note: Following the 1991 season, Georgia Southern left to join the Southern Conference.)	4	1980, 1985, 1986, 1987
Florida International (1991) (Note: Following the 1998 season, Florida International left to join the Sun Belt Conference.)	3	1991, 1995, 1998
UCF (1993) (Note: Following the 2005 season, UCF left to join Conference USA.)	3	2001, 2002, 2004
Austin Peay (2022)	2	2024, 2025
Jacksonville (1999)	2	2006, 2017
Lipscomb (2004)	2	2022, 2023
North Florida (2006)	2	2015, 2026
Southeastern Louisiana (1992) (Note: Following the 1997 season, Southeastern Louisiana left to join the Southland Conference.)	2	1992, 1993
Belmont (2002) (Note: Following the 2012 season, Belmont left to join the Ohio Valley Conference.)	1	2003
Campbell (1995) (Note: Following the 2011 season, Campbell left to join the Big South Conference.)	1	2000
Florida Atlantic (1994) (Note: Following the 2006 season, Florida Atlantic left to join the Sun Belt Conference.)	1	1999
Hardin–Simmons (1979) (Note: Following the 1990 season, Hardin–Simmons left to join the Division III Texas Intercollegiate Athletic Association.)	1	1982
Jacksonville State (1996) (Note: Following the 2003 season, Jacksonville State left to join the Ohio Valley Conference.)	1	1997
Kennesaw State (2006) (Note: Following the 2024 season, Kennesaw State left to join Conference USA.)	1	2016
Liberty (2019) (Note: Following the 2023 season, Liberty left to join Conference USA.)	1	2021
Nicholls State (1983) (Note: Following the 1984 season, Nicholls State left to join the Gulf Star Conference.)	1	1984
Troy (1998) (Note: Following the 2005 season, Troy left to join the Sun Belt Conference.)	1	2005
USC Upstate (2008)	1	2012

== Pitcher of the Year ==
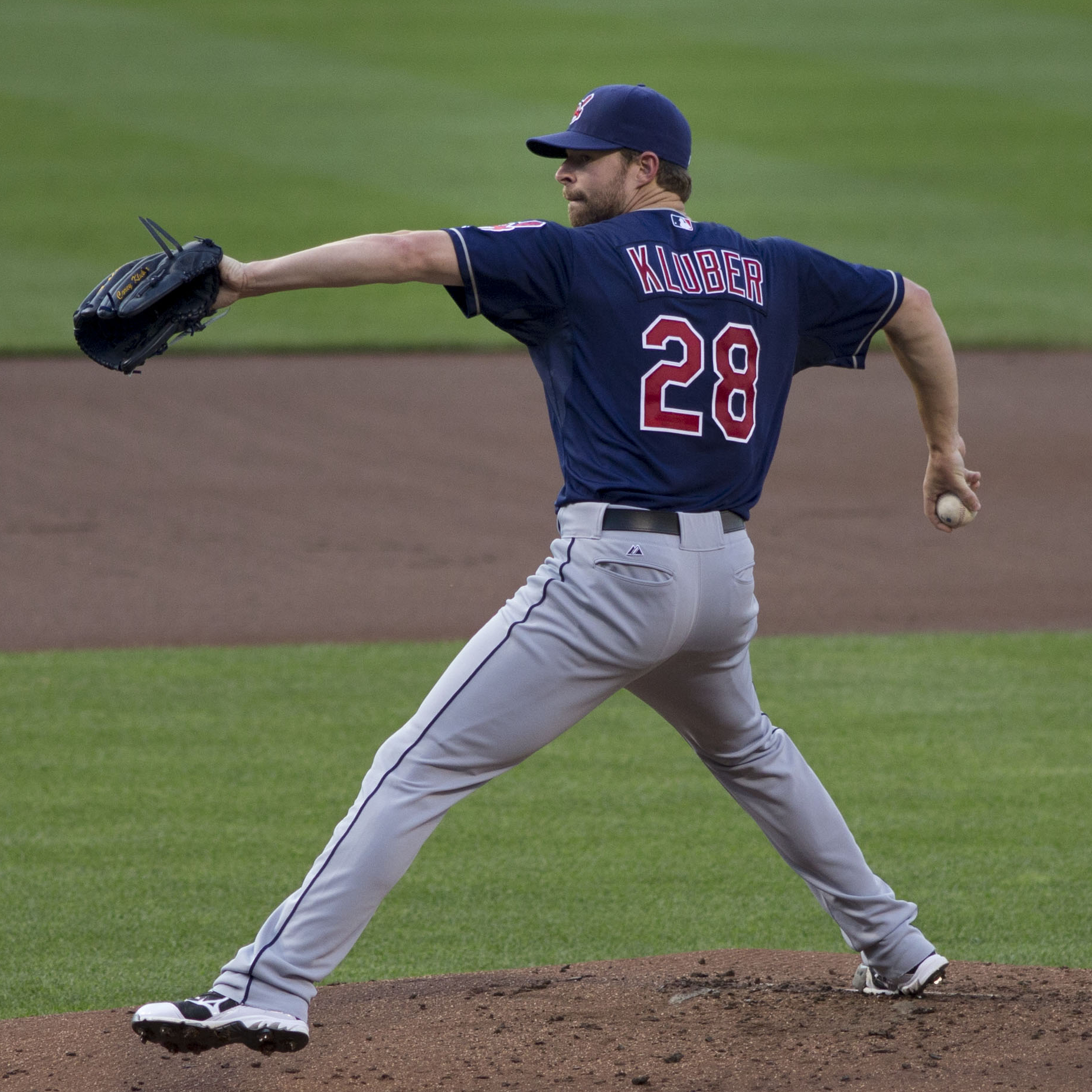
2007 recipient Corey Kluber

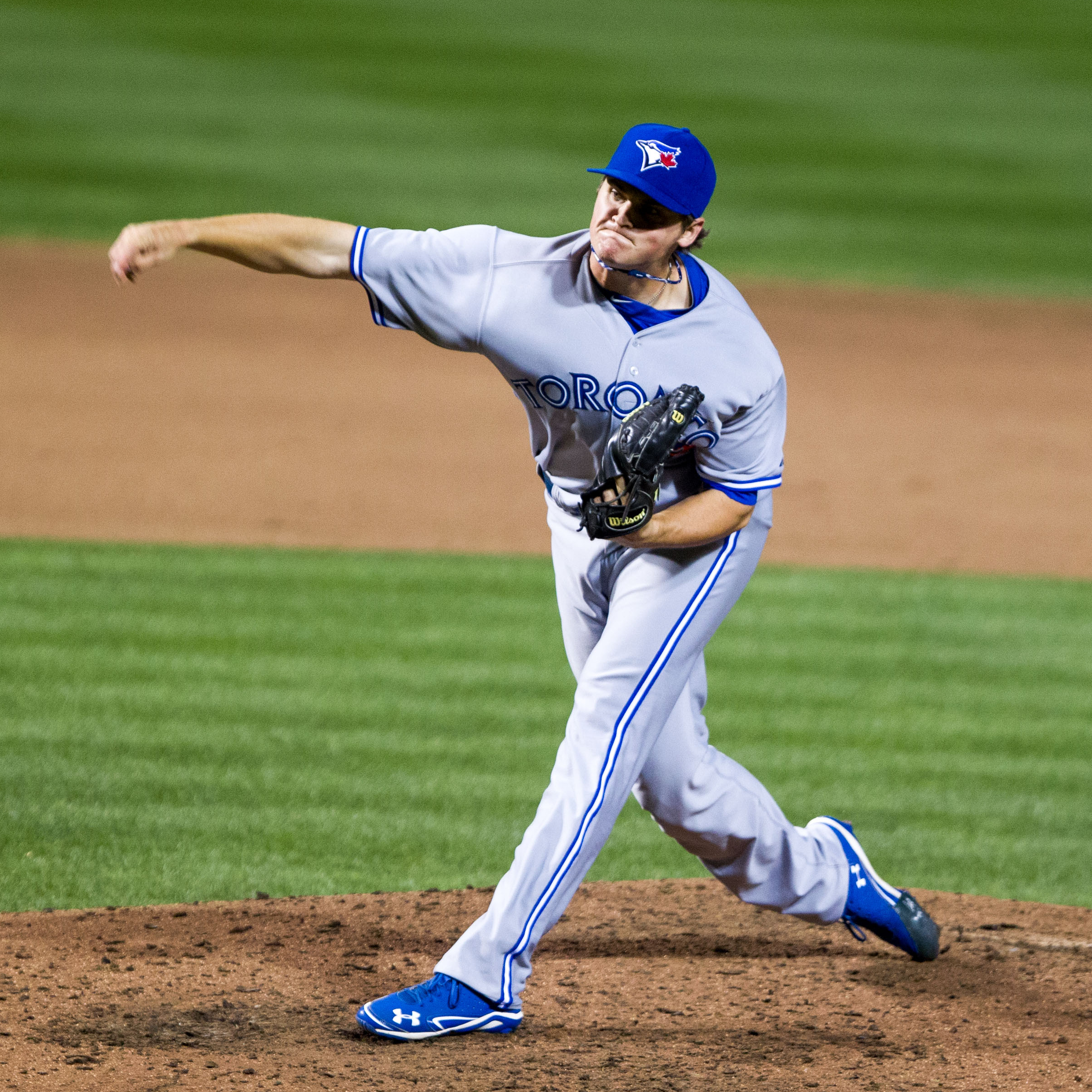
2009 recipient Chad Jenkins

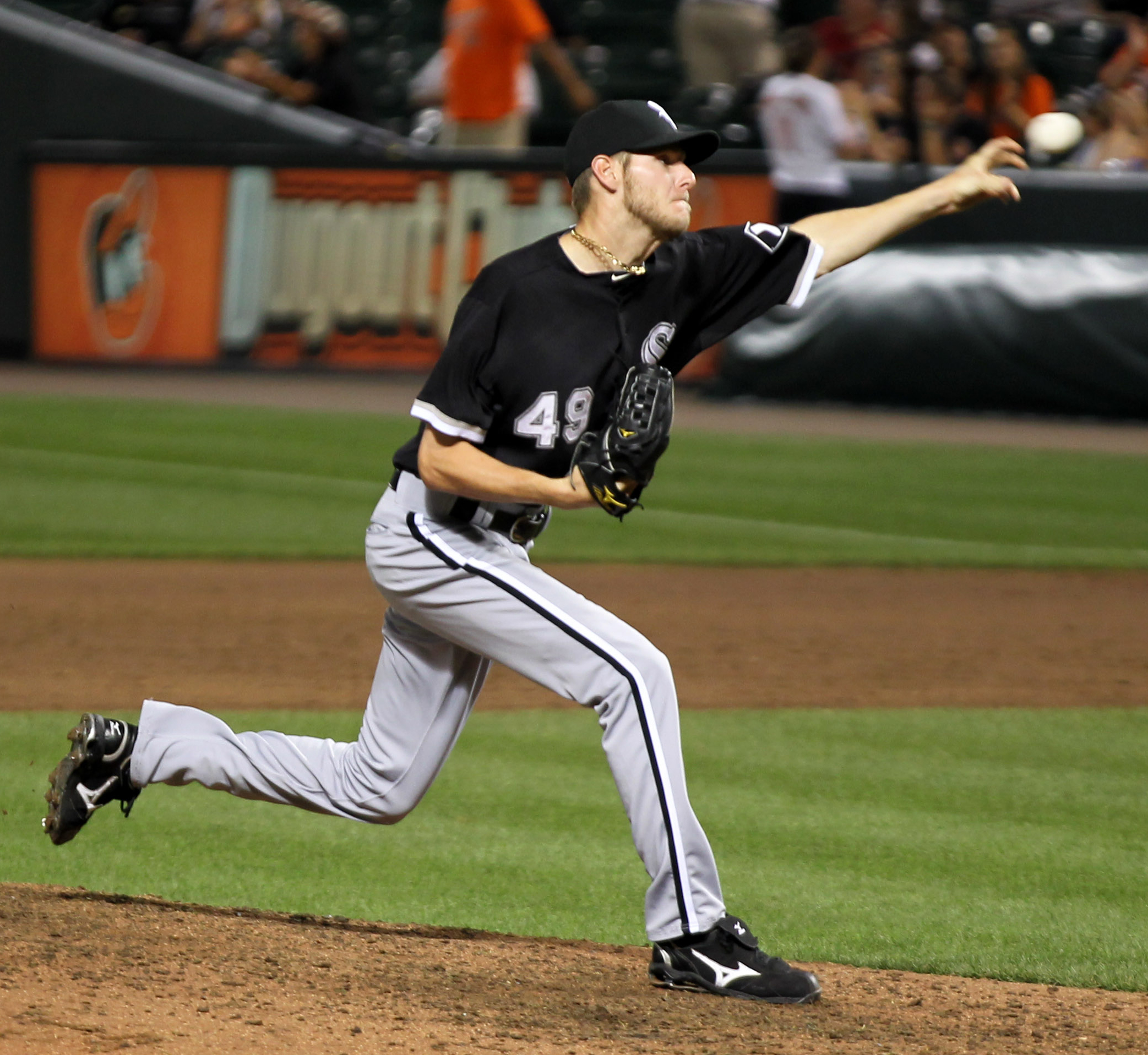
2010 recipient Chris Sale

The conference's Pitcher of the Year award is given annually to the best pitcher in the ASUN, as chosen by a vote of the conference's coaches at the end of the regular season. The award was first presented in 2004, prior to which pitchers were eligible for the Player of the Year Award.

Five of the award's winners—Florida Gulf Coast's Richard Bleier and Chris Sale, Kennesaw State's Chad Jenkins, Stetson's Corey Kluber, and UCF's Matt Fox—have gone on to pitch in Major League Baseball.

=== Winners by season ===
Below is a table of the award's winners since it was first awarded in 2004.

Season	Pitcher	School
2004	Matt Fox	UCF
2005	Brent Adcock	Troy
2006	Matt Dobbins	Jacksonville
2007	Corey Kluber	Stetson
2008	Richard Bleier	Florida Gulf Coast
2009	Chad Jenkins	Kennesaw State
2010	Chris Sale	Florida Gulf Coast
2011	Kurt Schluter	Stetson
2012	Ricky Knapp	Florida Gulf Coast
2013	Kerry Doane	East Tennessee State
2014	Michael Murray	Florida Gulf Coast
2015	Michael Baumann	Jacksonville
2016	Brady Puckett	Lipscomb
2017	Logan Gilbert	Stetson
2018	Logan Gilbert	Stetson
2019	Brad Deppermann	North Florida
2021	Trevor Delaite	Liberty
2022	Tyler Cleveland	Lipscomb
2023	Logan Van Treeck	Eastern Kentucky
2024	Jesse Barker	Austin Peay
2025	Jonathan Gonzalez	Stetson
2026	Evan Dempsey	Florida Gulf Coast

=== Winners by school ===
The following is a table of the schools whose pitchers have won the award, along with the year each school first played ASUN baseball, the number of times it has won the award, and the years in which it has done so.

School (year joined)	Awards	Seasons
Florida Gulf Coast (2008)	5	2008, 2010, 2012, 2014, 2026
Stetson (1986)	5	2007, 2011, 2017, 2018, 2025
Jacksonville (1999)	2	2006, 2015
Lipscomb (2004)	2	2016, 2022
Austin Peay (2022)	1	2024
East Tennessee State (2006) (Note: After the 2014 season, East Tennessee State left to join the Southern Conference.)	1	2013
Eastern Kentucky (2021)	1	2023
Kennesaw State (2006) (Note: After the 2024 season, Kennesaw State left to join Conference USA.)	1	2009
Liberty (2019) (Note: After the 2023 season, Liberty left to join Conference USA.)	1	2021
North Florida (2006)	1	2019
Troy (1997) (Note: After the 2005 season, Troy left to join the Sun Belt Conference.)	1	2005
UCF (1993) (Note: After the 2005 season, UCF left to join Conference USA.)	1	2004

== Player of the Year ==
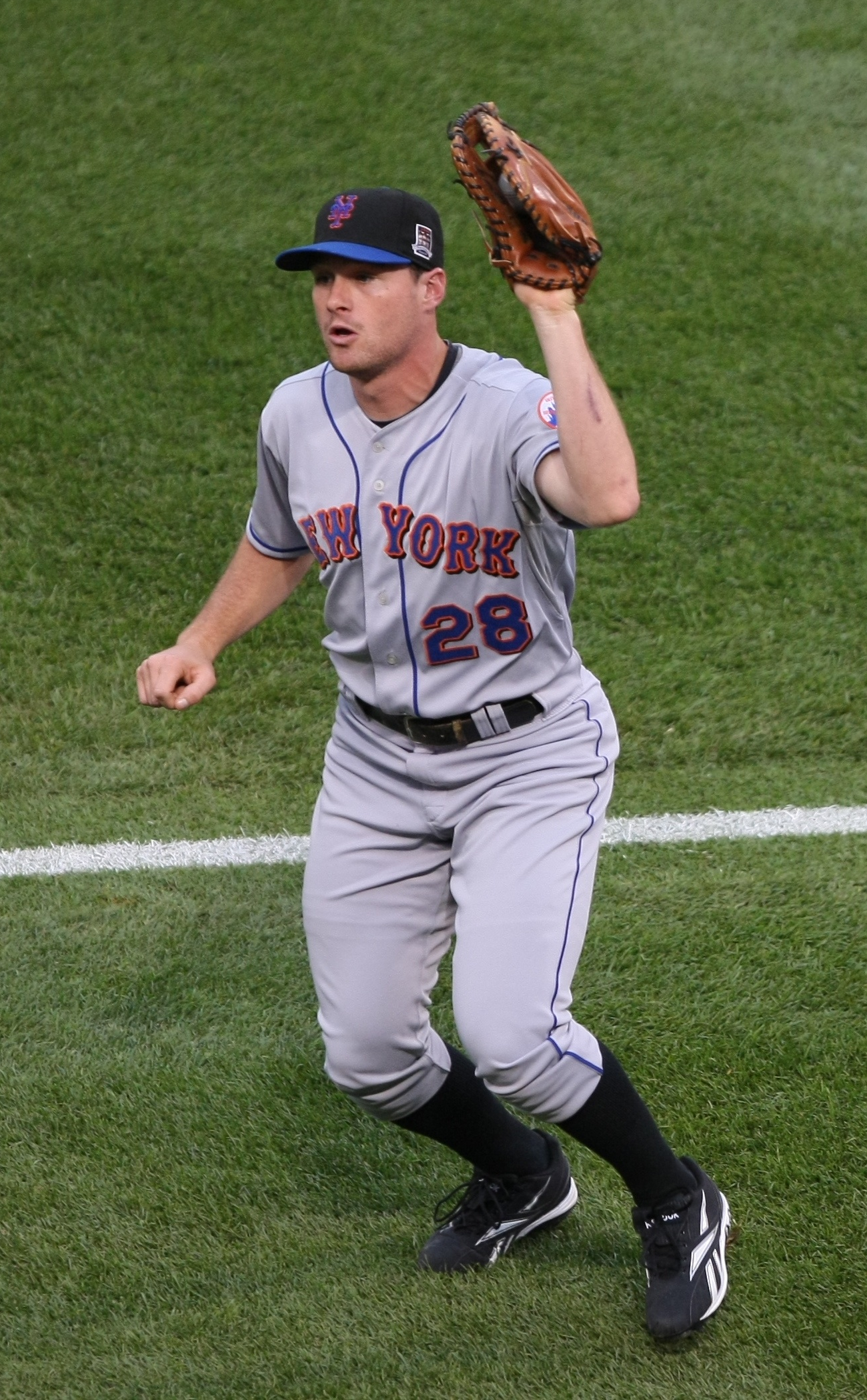
2006 recipient Daniel Murphy

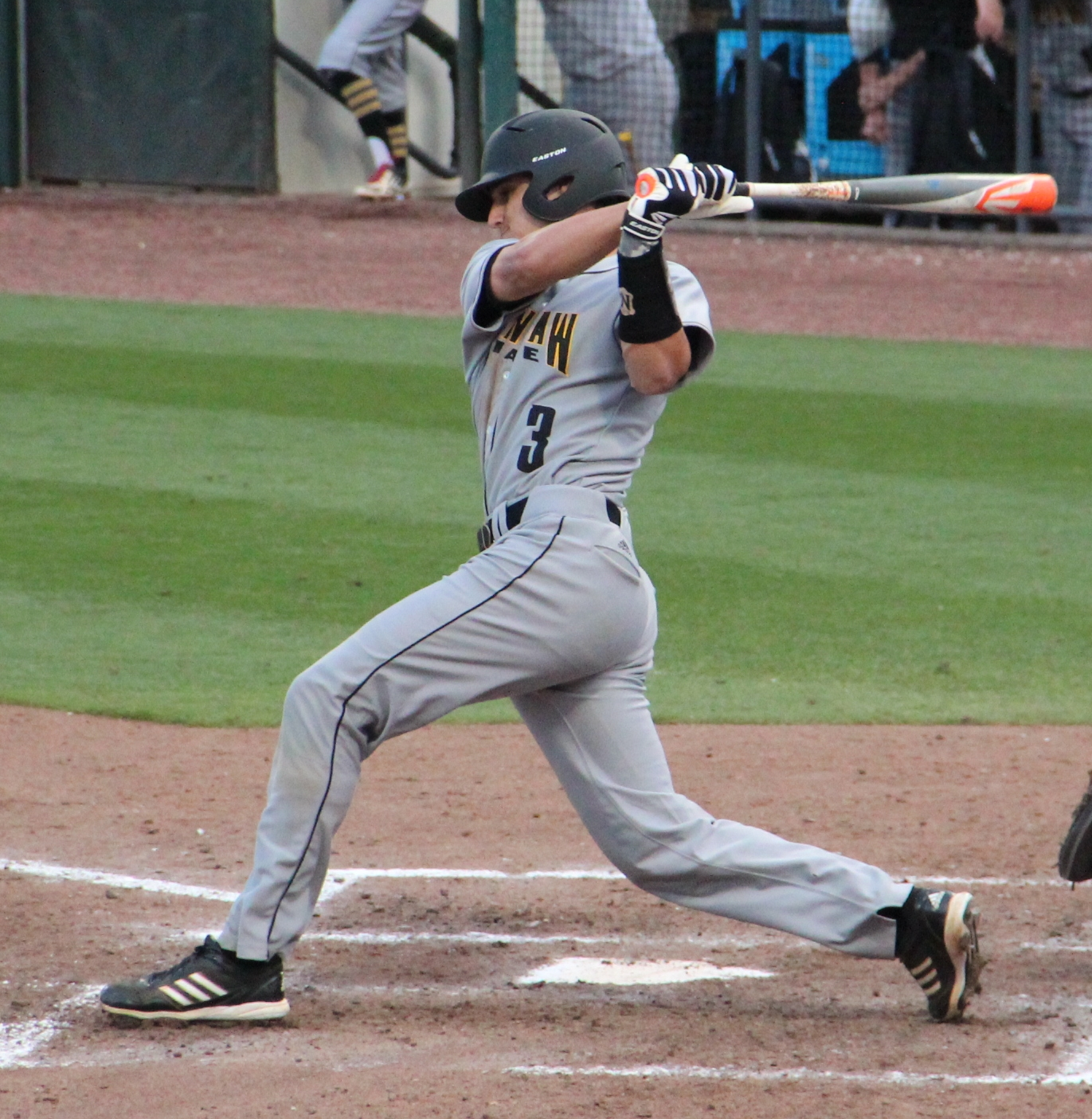
2014 recipient Max Pentecost

The conference's Player of the Year award is given annually to the best position player in the ASUN, as chosen by a vote of the conference's head coaches at the end of each regular season. It was first awarded in 1982. Until 2004, when the Pitcher of the Year award was instituted, both pitchers and position players were eligible. Before the conference was renamed, the award was known as the Trans America Athletic Conference Player of the Year award from 1982 to 2001.

Two players, both from Stetson, have won the award twice: shortstop Wes Weger in 1991 and 1992 and catcher Chris Westervelt in 2002 and 2004.

Five of the award's winners—Florida Gulf Coast's Jake Noll, Georgia Southern's Todd Greene, Jacksonville's Daniel Murphy, and Stetson's George Tsamis and Kevin Nicholson—have gone on to appear in Major League Baseball.

=== Winners by season ===
Below is a table of the award's winners since it was first awarded in 1982.

Season	Player	Pos.	School
1982	Frank Millerd	OF	Mercer
1983	Jack Pool	3B	Mercer
1984	Ben Abner	OF	Georgia Southern
1985	Craig Gibson	1B	Mercer
1986	Craig Cooper	1B	Georgia Southern
1987	Keith Richardson	P	Georgia Southern
1988	Jeff Shireman	SS	Georgia Southern
1989	George Tsamis	P	Stetson
1990	Todd Greene	OF	Georgia Southern
1991	Wes Weger	SS	Stetson
1992	Wes Weger	SS	Stetson
1993	Aaron Iatarola	OF	Stetson
1994	Chuck Beale	P	Stetson
1995	Evan Thomas	P	Florida International
1996	Jason Glover	OF	Georgia State
1997	Kevin Nicholson	SS	Stetson
1998	Sammy Serrano	C	Stetson
1999	Todd Moser	P	Florida Atlantic
2000	Frank Corr	OF	Stetson
2001	Justin Pope	P	UCF
2002	Chris Westervelt	C	Stetson
2003	Chad Hauseman	C	Jacksonville
2004	Chris Westervelt	C	Stetson
2005	Adam Godwin	OF	Troy
2006	Daniel Murphy	3B	Jacksonville
2007	Pete Clifford	OF	Jacksonville
2008	Jason Peacock	1B	Florida Gulf Coast
2009	Jeremy Cruz	OF	Stetson
2010	Paul Hoilman	1B	East Tennessee State
2011	Adam Brett Walker	1B	Jacksonville
2012	Gaither Bumgardner	OF	USC Upstate
2013	Chesny Young	3B	Mercer
2014	Max Pentecost	C	Kennesaw State
2015	Donnie Dewees	OF	North Florida
2016	Jake Noll	2B	Florida Gulf Coast
2017	Nick Rivera	DH	Florida Gulf Coast
2018	Brooks Wilson	P/DH	Stetson
2019	Jonathan Embry	C	Liberty
2021	Alex Kachler	C	North Florida
2022	Matt Higgins	OF	Bellarmine
2023	Edrick Felix	2B	Florida Gulf Coast
2024	Lyle Miller-Green	OF	Austin Peay
2025	Cameron Nickens	OF	Austin Peay
2026	Jon Embury	C	Florida Gulf Coast

=== Winners by school ===
The following is a table of the schools whose players have won the award, along with the season each school first played ASUN baseball, the number of times it has won the award, and the years in which it has done so.

School (year joined)	Awards	Seasons
Stetson (1986)	12	1989, 1991, 1992, 1993, 1994, 1997, 1998, 2000, 2002, 2004, 2009, 2018
Florida Gulf Coast (2008)	5	2008, 2016, 2017, 2023, 2026
Georgia Southern (1980) (Note: After the 1992 season, Georgia Southern left to join the Southern Conference.)	5	1984, 1986, 1987, 1988, 1990
Jacksonville (1999)	4	2003, 2006, 2007, 2011
Mercer (1979) (Note: After the 2014 season, Mercer left to join the Southern Conference.)	4	1982, 1983, 1985, 2013
Austin Peay (2022)	2	2024, 2025
North Florida (2006)	2	2015, 2021
Bellarmine (2021)	1	2022
East Tennessee State (2006) (Note: After the 2014 season, East Tennessee State left to join the Southern Conference.)	1	2010
Florida Atlantic (1994) (Note: After the 2006 season, Florida Atlantic left to join the Sun Belt Conference.)	1	1999
Florida International (1991) (Note: After the 1998 season, Florida International left to join the Sun Belt Conference.)	1	1995
Georgia State (1984) (Note: After the 2005 season, Georgia State left to join the Colonial Athletic Association.)	1	1996
Kennesaw State (2006) (Note: After the 2024 season, Kennesaw State left to join Conference USA.)	1	2014
Liberty (2019) (Note: After the 2023 season, Liberty left to join Conference USA.)	1	2019
Troy (1998) (Note: After the 2005 season, Troy left to join the Sun Belt Conference.)	1	2005
UCF (1993) (Note: After the 2005 season, UCF left to join Conference USA.)	1	2001
USC Upstate (2008)	1	2012

== Freshman of the Year ==
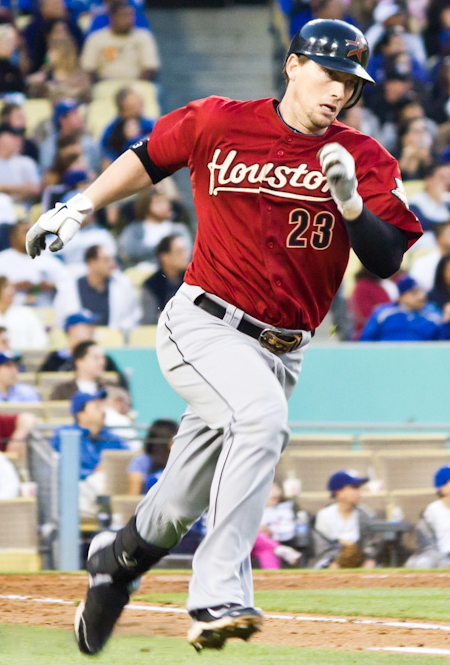
2005 recipient Chris Johnson

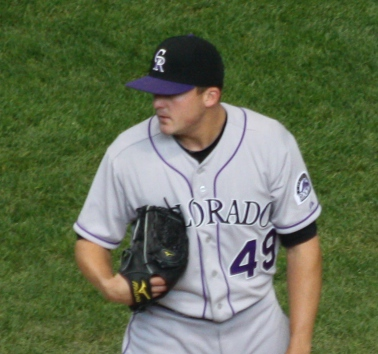
2007 recipient Rex Brothers

The conference's Freshman of the Year award is given annually to the best freshman in the ASUN, as chosen by a vote of the conference's head coaches at the end of each regular season. It was first awarded in 2001. Since the ASUN did not change its name from the TAAC until after that season, the award was known as the Trans America Athletic Conference Freshman of the Year for one season.

Three of the award's recipients—Florida Gulf Coast's Jake Noll, Lipscomb's Rex Brothers, and Stetson's Chris Johnson—went on to play in Major League Baseball.

=== Winners by season ===
Below is a table of the award's winners since it was first awarded in 2001.

Season	Player	Pos.	School
2001	Brian Zenchyk	IF	Stetson
2002	Dee Brown	OF	UCF
2003	Gordie Gronkowski	1B	Jacksonville
2004	Braedyn Pruitt	3B	Stetson
2005	Chris Johnson	1B	Stetson
2006	Derek Wiley	IF	Belmont
2007	Rex Brothers	P	Lipscomb
2008	Robert Crews	3B	Stetson
2009	Dylan Craig	OF	Belmont
2010	Dan Gulbransen	OF	Jacksonville
2011	Alex Bacon	OF	North Florida
2012	Chesny Young	3B	Mercer
2013	Patrick Mazeika	1B	Stetson
2014	Jake Noll	2B	Florida Gulf Coast
2015	Michael Baumann	P	Jacksonville
2016	Devon Ortiz	UT	USC Upstate
2017	Richie Garcia	3B	Florida Gulf Coast
2018	Christian Proffitt	SS	Florida Gulf Coast
2019	Daniel Paret	P	Stetson
2021	Trey Gibson	P	Liberty
2022	Donovan Cash	1B	Kennesaw State
2023	Evan Chrest	P	Jacksonville
2024	Kyle Jones	OF	Stetson
2025	Cole Johnson	UT	Austin Peay
2026	Khaleel Pratt	OF	Eastern Kentucky

=== Winners by school ===
The following is a table of the schools whose freshmen have won the award, along with the season each school first played ASUN baseball, the number of times it has won the award, and the years in which it has done so.

School (year joined)	Awards	Seasons
Stetson (1986)	7	2001, 2004, 2005, 2008, 2013, 2019, 2024
Jacksonville (1999)	4	2003, 2010, 2015, 2023
Florida Gulf Coast (2008)	3	2014, 2017, 2018
Belmont (2002) (Note: After the 2012 season, Belmont left to join the Ohio Valley Conference.)	2	2006, 2009
Austin Peay (2022)	1	2025
Eastern Kentucky (2021)	1	2026
Kennesaw State (2006) (Note: After the 2024 season, Kennesaw State left to join Conference USA.)	1	2022
Liberty (2019) (Note: After the 2023 season, Liberty left to join Conference USA.)	1	2021
Lipscomb (2004)	1	2007
Mercer (1979) (Note: After the 2014 season, Mercer left to join the Southern Conference.)	1	2012
North Florida (2006)	1	2011
UCF (1993) (Note: After the 2005 season, UCF left to join Conference USA.)	1	2002
USC Upstate (2008)	1	2016

== Defensive Player of the Year ==
The conference began issuing the Defensive Player of the Year Award following the 2014 season.

=== Winners by season ===
Below is a table of the award's winners since it was first presented in 2014.

Season	Player	Pos.	School
2014	Michael Massi	SS	Mercer
2015	Grant Massey	SS	Lipscomb
2016	Kyle Brooks	SS	North Florida
2017	Michael Gigliotti	OF	Lipscomb
2017	Grant Williams	INF	Kennesaw State
2018	Gage Morey	OF	Florida Gulf Coast
2019	Dakota Julylia	SS	Jacksonville
2021	Cam Locklear	SS	Liberty
2022	Caleb Ketchup	SS	Lipscomb
2023	Logan Thomason	SS	Eastern Kentucky
2024	Jon Jon Gazdar	SS	Austin Peay
2025	Lorenzo Meola	SS	Stetson
2026	Sammy Mummau	SS	Jacksonville

=== Winners by school ===
The following is a table of the schools whose players have won the award, along with the year in which each school first played ASUN baseball, the number of times it has won the award, and the years in which it has done so.

School (year joined)	Awards	Seasons
Lipscomb (2004)	3	2015, 2017, 2022
Jacksonville (1999)	2	2019, 2026
Austin Peay (2022)	1	2024
Eastern Kentucky (2021)	1	2023
Florida Gulf Coast (2008)	1	2018
Kennesaw State (2006)	1	2017
Liberty (2019)	1	2021
Mercer (1979)	1	2014
North Florida (2006)	1	2016
Stetson (1986)	1	2025
