= George Tsamis =

American baseball player (born 1967)

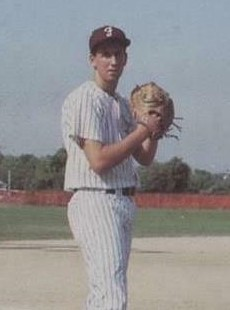

Kane County Cougars – No. 22
- Pitcher / Manager
- Born: June 14, 1967 (age 58); Campbell, California, U.S.
- Batted: Right Threw: Left

MLB debut
- April 26, 1993, for the Minnesota Twins

Last MLB appearance
- October 1, 1993, for the Minnesota Twins

MLB statistics
- Win–loss record: 1–2
- Earned run average: 6.19
- Strikeouts: 30
- Stats at Baseball Reference

Teams
- Minnesota Twins (1993)

George Alex Tsamis (Greek: Γιώργος Τσάμης; born June 14, 1967) is an American professional baseball coach and former pitcher who is currently the manager for the Kane County Cougars of the American Association of Professional Baseball. He pitched one season in Major League Baseball (MLB) for the Minnesota Twins in 1993.

After he retired from professional baseball in 1998, Tsamis became a manager in the independent minor leagues. He joined the Waterbury Spirit of the Northeast League in 1999 and later managed the New Jersey Jackals beginning in 2001. He left the Jackals to manage the St. Paul Saints in 2003 and managed them through the 2020 season before taking his job with the Cougars.

Tsamis is a four-time league champion as a manager. He led the Jackals to the 2001 and 2002 Northern League championships, then led the Saints to the 2004 Northern League Championship and the 2019 American Association championship.

== Little League World Series ==
George Tsamis represented the team from Campbell, California at the 1979 Little League World Series. His team lost the championship to Taiwan, 2-1. Following the loss, Tsamis’ parents took George out for ice cream.

== Playing career ==
Tsamis attended Stetson University, where he played college baseball for the Hatters under head coach Pete Dunn. From 1986 to 1988, he played collegiate summer baseball with the Falmouth Commodores of the Cape Cod Baseball League and was named a league all-star in 1988. He was named the TAAC Player of the Year in 1989.

Tsamis was drafted by the Twins in the 15th round of the 1989 MLB draft. He made his MLB debut in 1993, appearing in 41 games with a record of 1-2 with an ERA of 6.19. Arguably the highlight of Tsamis' MLB career came August 14, 1993. During the second game of a doubleheader against the Athletics, Tsamis threw 4 scoreless innings to close out the game and notch his first and only career major league save. He preserved the game for starting pitcher Mike Trombley.

Tsamis was a replacement player with the Los Angeles Dodgers during spring training prior to the 1995 season. Replacement players took over for the regular, unionized baseball players when the Major League Baseball Players Association (MLBPA) went on strike in 1994. The strike was resolved at the end of spring training, and Tsamis returned to the minor leagues, where he pitched until 1998. Due to his role as a replacement player, Tsamis was not permitted membership in the MLBPA.

== Managerial career ==
Tsamis managed the Waterbury Spirit (1999–2000) and New Jersey Jackals (2001–02), winning league titles with the Jackals in both his seasons. In 2003, he was hired to manage the Saints, then in the Northern League. The team moved to the American Association in 2006. Tsamis managed through Saints through the 2020 season, after which they left the American Association and became Triple-A affiliates of the Minnesota Twins.

On February 23, 2021, Tsamis was named manager of the Kane County Cougars, a former Low-A Midwest League club that later moved to the American Association due to the restructuring of Minor League Baseball. In moving to the Chicago suburbs, he retained his longtime coaching staff of Kerry Ligtenberg (pitching coach) and Ole Sheldon (hitting coach). In 2022, the Cougars made the playoffs with a 54–46 record but was knocked out of the first round by the Cleburne Railroaders in three games. The Cougars made the playoffs the following year with the same outcome this time losing to the Milwaukee Milkmen. In 2024, the Cougars would make the playoffs for the third year in a row with a 55–45 record this time sweeping the Lake Country DockHounds in the first round, sweeping the Chicago Dogs in the East Division championship series, and sweeping the Winnipeg Goldeyes in the Miles Wolff Cup Final bringing home the Cougars' third title in franchise history and their first Miles Wolff Cup since joining the American Association. In 2025, the Cougars were able to defend their title this time beating the Sioux Falls Canaries in five games.

Tsamis managed the North Division in the American Association All-Star Game in Sioux Falls, South Dakota.
