= Dave Tollett =

American college baseball coach (born 1966)

Current position
- Title: Head coach
- Team: Florida Gulf Coast
- Conference: ASUN
- Record: 808–501–3

Biographical details
- Born: March 30, 1966 (age 60)
- Education: Tusculum College '88

Playing career
- 1985–1988: Tusculum
- Position: Third base

Coaching career (HC unless noted)
- 1987–1996: Charlotte HS (FL)
- 1997–2001: Edison CC (assistant)
- 2002–present: Florida Gulf Coast

Head coaching record
- Overall: 808–501–3 (college); 175–96 (high school)
- Tournaments: A-Sun: 30–24; NCAA DII: 3–4; NCAA DI: 1–2

Accomplishments and honors

Championships
- 7× Regular season A-Sun Champions: 2008, 2009, 2010, 2014, 2019, 2021, 2024; 2x A-Sun Tournament champion: 2017, 2025; A-Sun South Division 2021

Awards
- 5× A-Sun Coach of the Year: 2008, 2009, 2010, 2014, 2019

David Tollett (born March 30, 1966) is an American college baseball coach who has been the head coach of Florida Gulf Coast since 2002, the program's first season. Under Tollett, the Eagles have appeared in two NCAA Division I Tournaments and won Atlantic Sun Conference (A-Sun) regular season championships in 2008, 2009, 2010, 2014, 2019, and 2021.Tollett's 2017 season was the most successful in program history as the Green and Blue won a program record 43 games, claimed the program's first ASUN Tournament championship, and advanced to the NCAA tournament for the first time. After starting the season 24–3 and defeating then #2 and eventual National Champion Florida, then #1 FSU and Miami in the same season for the first time ever, FGCU rose to as high as #9 in the Collegiate Baseball News poll - marking the highest ranking ever achieved by any athletics program in school history. Following the hot start to the season, Tollett was named the Perfect Game Midseason Coach of the Year. The Green and Blue suffered a number of tough losses in April, but ended the regular season by sweeping its way through its final three conference series and earned the No. 3 seed in the ASUN Tournament. After falling into the loser's bracket following a loss on day two, FGCU won an improbable four elimination games in less than 30 hours and defeated top-seeded Jacksonville twice, including an extra-inning thriller in the winner-take-all championship. With the ASUN's automatic bid to the NCAA tournament in hand, the Eagles earned the No. 2 seed in the Chapel Hill Regional and defeated No. 3 Michigan, 10–6, in its first-ever NCAA tournament game. Tollett was named the A-Sun Coach of the Year in 2008, 2009, 2010, 2014, and 2019. Worst loss of career came during the 2013 season when Tollett and the Eagles lost to an NAIA school, Ave Maria. Tollett has had 47 players at FGCU drafted or signed as free agents in Major League Baseball including Chris Sale, Casey Coleman, Richard Bleier, Jacob Barnes, Jake Noll, and Kutter Crawford.

== Head coaching record ==
Below is a table of Tollett's yearly records as a collegiate head baseball coach.

Record table
Season	Team	Overall	Conference	Standing	Postseason
Florida Gulf Coast (Independent – NAIA) (2003)
2003	Florida Gulf Coast	35–15–2			
Florida Gulf Coast (Division II independent) (2004–2007)
2004	Florida Gulf Coast	39–17			
2005	Florida Gulf Coast	37–18			
2006	Florida Gulf Coast	41–17			NCAA Regional
2007	Florida Gulf Coast	40–17			NCAA Regional
Florida Gulf Coast:					
Florida Gulf Coast (Atlantic Sun Conference – DI) (2008–present)
2008 (Note: Until the 2010 season, FGCU was ineligible for the postseason while it transitioned to Division I.)	Florida Gulf Coast	38–15	25–8	1st	
2009	Florida Gulf Coast	36–18	23–7	1st	
2010	Florida Gulf Coast	38–20	25–5	1st	
2011	Florida Gulf Coast	27–28	16–14	7th	
2012	Florida Gulf Coast	26–31	15–12	T-4th	
2013	Florida Gulf Coast	37–20	19–8	2nd	
2014	Florida Gulf Coast	39–22	19–8	1st	
2015	Florida Gulf Coast	30–26–1	11–9	5th	
2016	Florida Gulf Coast	27–32	9–12	T-5th	
2017	Florida Gulf Coast	43–20	13–8	3rd	NCAA Regional
2018	Florida Gulf Coast	32–21	8–13	7th	
2019	Florida Gulf Coast	34–21	16–7	1st	ASUN tournament
2020	Florida Gulf Coast	9–7			Season canceled on March 12 due to Coronavirus pandemic
2021	Florida Gulf Coast	28–20	12–6	1st (South)	ASUN tournament
2022	Florida Gulf Coast	35–23	17–13	3rd (East)	ASUN tournament
2023	Florida Gulf Coast	42–18	20–10	T-2nd	ASUN tournament
2024	Florida Gulf Coast	30–26	20–10	T-1st	ASUN tournament
2025	Florida Gulf Coast	31–29	16–14	3rd (Graphite)	ASUN tournament
2026	Florida Gulf Coast	34–20	17–12	2nd (Graphite)	ASUN tournament
Florida Gulf Coast:		808–501–3	301–174		
Total:		808–501–3			
National champion Postseason invitational champion Conference regular season champion Conference regular season and conference tournament champion Division regular season champion Division regular season and conference tournament champion Conference tournament champion

== See also ==
- List of current NCAA Division I baseball coaches
- Florida Gulf Coast Eagles
