= Stetson Hatters baseball =

- 2026 Stetson Hatters baseball team
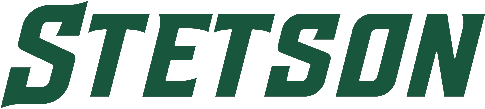
- Founded: 1901
- Overall record: 1,702–1,161–3
- University: Stetson University
- Head coach: Shane Gierke (1st season)
- Conference: ASUN Conference; Graphite Division
- Location: DeLand, Florida
- Home stadium: Melching Field at Conrad Park (capacity: 2,500)
- Nickname: Hatters
- Colors: Hunter green and white

NCAA regional champions
- 2018

NCAA tournament appearances
- 1982, 1984, 1988, 1989, 1990, 1992, 1996, 1997, 2000, 2001, 2002, 2003, 2005, 2006, 2007, 2011, 2016, 2018, 2024, 2025

Conference tournament champions
- 1988, 1989, 1990, 2000, 2005, 2006, 2016, 2018, 2024, 2025

Conference regular season champions
- 1989, 1991, 1996, 2007, 2011, 2018, 2024

The Stetson Hatters baseball team represents Stetson University, which is located in DeLand, Florida. The Hatters are an NCAA Division I college baseball program that competes in the ASUN Conference. They began competing in Division I in 1972 and joined the ASUN Conference in 1986.

The Stetson Hatters play all home games off-campus at Melching Field at Conrad Park. Since their promotion to Division I in 1972, the Hatters have played in 18 NCAA tournaments and hosted and won their first regional in 2018. Over their 34 seasons in the ASUN Conference (formerly the Trans America Athletic Conference), they have won six conference regular season titles and eight conference tournaments.

Since the program's inception in 1901, 10 Hatters have gone on to play in Major League Baseball, highlighted by recent Cy Young Award winners Jacob deGrom and Corey Kluber. Under current head coach Steve Trimper, nine Hatters have been drafted, including Logan Gilbert who was selected in the first round of the 2018 Major League Baseball draft.

== Conference membership history (Division I only) ==
- 1972–1985: Independent
- 1986–present: Trans America Athletic Conference / ASUN Conference

== Melching Field at Conrad Park ==
Melching Field at Conrad Park is a baseball stadium in DeLand, Florida, that seats 2,500 people. It was opened on February 12, 1999, with a 4–3 win over Louisville. A record attendance of 2,975 was set on March 20, 2007, during a non-conference game against Florida.

== Head coaches (Division I only) ==
Records taken from the 2019 Stetson Baseball Guide

Season	Coach	Years	Record	Pct.
1972–1979	Jim Ward	8	225–143	.611
1980–2016	Pete Dunn	37	1312–888–3	.596
2017–present	Steve Trimper	8	241–173	.582
Totals	3 coaches	53 seasons	1,778–1,206–3	.596

== Year-by-year NCAA Division I results ==
Records taken from the 2019 Stetson Baseball Guide

Record table
Season	Coach	Overall	Conference	Standing	Postseason
Independent (1972–1985)
1972	Jim Ward	27–17			
1973	Jim Ward	24–23			
1974	Jim Ward	30–13			
1975	Jim Ward	28–19			
1976	Jim Ward	23–15			
1977	Jim Ward	34–15			
1978	Jim Ward	33–17			
1979	Jim Ward	26–24			
1980	Pete Dunn	34–18			
1981	Pete Dunn	36–20			
1982	Pete Dunn	40–18			NCAA Regional
1983	Pete Dunn	31–20			
1984	Pete Dunn	46–13			NCAA Regional
1985	Pete Dunn	36–22			
Trans America Athletic Conference / ASUN Conference (1986–present)
1986	Pete Dunn	36–22	N/A	N/A	
1987	Pete Dunn	37–22	12–6	2nd (East)	
1988	Pete Dunn	35–26	9–8	2nd (East)	NCAA Regional
1989	Pete Dunn	38–23	13–5	1st (East)	NCAA Regional
1990	Pete Dunn	33–31	10–8	2nd (East)	NCAA Regional
1991	Pete Dunn	36–22–1	13–5	1st (East)	
1992	Pete Dunn	38–21	13–5	T-1st (East)	NCAA Regional
1993	Pete Dunn	38–17	11–7	1st (East)	
1994	Pete Dunn	37–21	9–9	2nd (East)	
1995	Pete Dunn	34–25	19–11	3rd	
1996	Pete Dunn	42–23	12–6	1st (South)	NCAA Regional
1997	Pete Dunn	37–26–1	10–8	T-1st (South)	NCAA Regional
1998	Pete Dunn	30–31–1	9–12	3rd (South)	
1999	Pete Dunn	23–31	11–19	9th	
2000	Pete Dunn	48–16	20–7	T-2nd	NCAA Regional
2001	Pete Dunn	43–17	19–8	2nd	NCAA Regional
2002	Pete Dunn	42–19	19–9	3rd	NCAA Regional
2003	Pete Dunn	41–24	21–12	2nd	NCAA Regional
2004	Pete Dunn	36–23	20–10	T-2nd	
2005	Pete Dunn	35–28	16–14	4th	NCAA Regional
2006	Pete Dunn	38–24	16–14	4th	NCAA Regional
2007	Pete Dunn	42–21	21–6	1st	NCAA Regional
2008	Pete Dunn	26–33	15–18	T-8th	
2009	Pete Dunn	27–30	16–14	5th	
2010	Pete Dunn	27–31	14–13	6th	
2011	Pete Dunn	43–20	23–7	1st	NCAA Regional
2012	Pete Dunn	35–23	15–12	T-4th	
2013	Pete Dunn	26–31	15–12	5th	
2014	Pete Dunn	26–34	13–14	7th	
2015	Pete Dunn	29–30	12–9	T-3rd	
2016	Pete Dunn	29–31	9–12	T-5th	NCAA Regional
2017	Steve Trimper	27–29	15–6	2nd	
2018	Steve Trimper	48–11	15–3	1st	NCAA Super Regional
2019	Steve Trimper	27–32	11–12	6th	
2020	Steve Trimper	11–4			Season canceled on March 12 due to Coronavirus pandemic
Total:		1,650–1,109–3			
National champion Postseason invitational champion Conference regular season champion Conference regular season and conference tournament champion Division regular season champion Division regular season and conference tournament champion Conference tournament champion

== NCAA Division I Tournament history ==
- The NCAA Division I baseball tournament started in 1947.
- The format of the tournament has changed through the years.
- Stetson began playing Division I baseball in 1972.

Year	Record	Pct	Notes
1982	2–2	.500	Eliminated by Miami (FL) in Atlantic Regional
1984	1–2	.333	Eliminated by South Alabama in South I Regional
1988	3–2	.600	Eliminated by Florida in East Regional
1989	1–2	.333	Eliminated by Clemson in Atlantic Regional
1990	0–2	.000	Eliminated by NC State in Atlantic Regional
1992	0–2	.000	Eliminated by Florida State in South II Regional
1996	2–2	.500	Eliminated by Virginia in South I Regional
1997	0–2	.000	Eliminated by Harvard in Midwest Regional
2000	2–2	.500	Eliminated by Georgia Tech in Atlanta Regional
2001	2–2	.500	Eliminated by Miami (FL) in Coral Gables Regional
2002	0–2	.000	Eliminated by South Florida in Tallahassee Regional
2003	2–2	.500	Eliminated by South Carolina in Columbia Regional
2005	0–2	.000	Eliminated by Notre Dame in Gainesville Regional
2006	0–2	.000	Eliminated by Michigan in Atlanta Regional
2007	1–2	.333	Eliminated by Florida State in Tallahassee Regional
2011	2–2	.500	Eliminated by South Carolina in Columbia Regional
2016	0–2	.000	Eliminated by Florida Atlantic in Coral Gables Regional
2018	3–2	.600	Eliminated by North Carolina in Chapel Hill Super Regional
2024	1–2	.333	Eliminated by UCF in Tallahassee Regional
2025	1–2	.333	Eliminated by NC State in Auburn Regional
Totals	23–40	.365	

== Awards and honors (Division I only) ==
=== All-Americans ===
Year	Position	Name	Team	Selector
1989	P	Tom Hickox	3rd	BA
1997	SS	Kevin Nicholson	2nd	BA
1997	SS	Kevin Nicholson	3rd	ABCA
1998	C	Sammy Serrano	1st	BA
1998	C	Sammy Serrano	1st	CB
1998	C	Sammy Serrano	2nd	ABCA
2000	OF	Frank Corr	1st	ABCA
2000	OF	Frank Corr	2nd	BA
2000	OF	Frank Corr	2nd	CB
2000	P	Lenny DiNardo	1st	ABCA
2000	P	Lenny DiNardo	1st	BA
2000	P	Lenny DiNardo	1st	CB
2001	OF	Frank Corr	2nd	NCBWA
2001	P	Lenny DiNardo	3rd	CB
2002	C	Chris Westervelt	2nd	CB
2002	C	Chris Westervelt	3rd	BA
2003	3B	Brian Snyder	1st	BA
2003	3B	Brian Snyder	3rd	CB
2004	C	Chris Westervelt	3rd	CB
2006	1B	Chris Johnson	3rd	CB
2007	P	Corey Kluber	2nd	CB
2009	OF	Jeremy Cruz	2nd	ABCA
2009	OF	Jeremy Cruz	2nd	CB
2011	C	Nick Rickles	2nd	BA
2011	C	Nick Rickles	3rd	CB
2011	P	Kurt Schluter	3rd	CB
2012	P	Robbie Powell	3rd	CB
2017	P	Logan Gilbert	2nd	CB
2017	P	Logan Gilbert	2nd	NCBWA
2018	P	Logan Gilbert	1st	BA
2018	P	Logan Gilbert	1st	CB
2018	P	Logan Gilbert	1st	NCBWA
2018	P	Joey Gonzalez	3rd	NCBWA
2018	P/UT/DH	Brooks Wilson	1st	ABCA
2018	P/UT/DH	Brooks Wilson	1st	BA
2018	P/UT/DH	Brooks Wilson	1st	CB
2018	P/UT/DH	Brooks Wilson	1st	NCBWA
2019	P	Mitchell Senger	2nd	CB

=== Freshman First-Team All-Americans ===
Year	Position	Name	Selector
1996	C	Sammy Serrano	CB
1998	UT	Frank Corr	CB
1999	P	Lenny DiNardo	BA
2001	P	Jack Collins	CB
2001	3B	Brian Snyder	CB
2001	1B	Bryan Zenchyk	CB
2004	P	Chris Ingoglia	CB
2004	OF	Shane Jordan	CB
2005	C	David Golliner	CB
2005	1B	Chris Johnson	CB
2007	SS	Casey Frawley	CB
2008	3B	Robert Crews	CB
2009	2B	Mark Jones	CB
2009	C	Nick Rickles	CB
2010	SS	Ryan Lashley	CB
2013	INF/P	Kevin Fagan	CB
2013	1B	Patrick Mazeika	BA
2013	1B	Patrick Mazeika	CB
2013	1B	Patrick Mazeika	NCBWA
2015	P	Brooks Wilson	CB
2019	P	Danny Garcia	CB
2019	P	Daniel Paret	CB

=== Trans America Athletic Conference / ASUN Conference Player of the Year ===
Year	Position	Name
1989	P	George Tsamis
1991	SS	Wes Weger
1992	SS	Wes Weger
1993	OF	Aaron Iatarola
1994	P	Chuck Beale
1997	SS	Kevin Nicholson
1998	C	Sammy Serrano
2000	OF	Frank Corr
2002	C	Chris Westervelt
2004	C	Chris Westervelt
2009	OF	Jeremy Cruz
2018	P/DH	Brooks Wilson

=== Trans America Athletic Conference / ASUN Conference Pitcher of the Year ===
Year	Handedness	Name
2007	Right	Corey Kluber
2011	Right	Kurt Schluter
2017	Right	Logan Gilbert
2018	Right	Logan Gilbert

=== Trans America Athletic Conference / ASUN Conference Freshman of the Year ===
Year	Position	Name
2001	1B	Bryan Zenchyk
2004	3B	Braedyn Pruitt
2005	1B	Chris Johnson
2008	3B	Robert Crews
2013	1B	Patrick Mazeika
2019	P	Daniel Paret

Taken from the 2019 Stetson baseball guide. Updated September 7, 2019.

== Hatters in the Major Leagues ==
= All-Star	= Baseball Hall of Famer

Athlete	Years in MLB	MLB teams
Brian Bocock	2008, 2010	San Francisco Giants, Philadelphia Phillies
Jacob deGrom	2014–present	New York Mets, Texas Rangers
Lenny DiNardo	2004–2009	Boston Red Sox, Oakland Athletics, Kansas City Royals
Logan Gilbert	2021–present	Seattle Mariners
Chris Johnson	2009–2016	Houston Astros, Arizona Diamondbacks, Atlanta Braves, Cleveland Indians, Miami Marlins
Corey Kluber	2011–2023	Cleveland Indians, Texas Rangers, New York Yankees, Tampa Bay Rays, Boston Red Sox
Eric Knott	2001, 2003	Arizona Diamondbacks, Montreal Expos
Patrick Mazeika	2021–2022	New York Mets
Kevin Nicholson	2000	San Diego Padres
Wade Rowdon	1984–1988	Cincinnati Reds, Chicago Cubs, Baltimore Orioles
Bill Swaggerty	1983–1986	Baltimore Orioles
George Tsamis	1993	Minnesota Twins

Taken from the 2019 Stetson baseball guide. Updated September 6, 2019.
