= Matt Fox (baseball) =

American baseball player (born 1982)

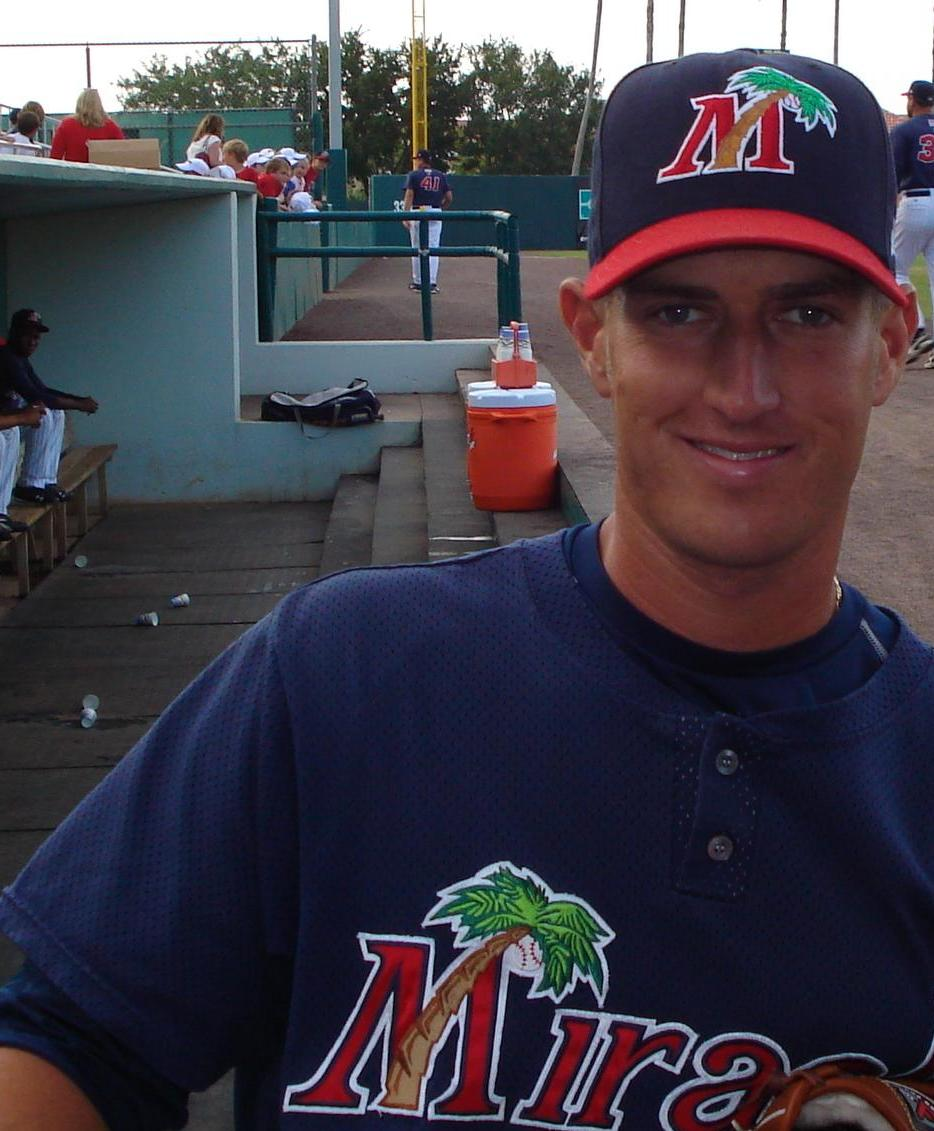
- Fox with the Fort Myers Miracle
- Pitcher
- Born: December 4, 1982 (age 43); Columbus, Ohio, U.S.
- Batted: Right Threw: Right

MLB debut
- September 3, 2010, for the Minnesota Twins

Last appearance
- September 28, 2010, for the Boston Red Sox

MLB statistics
- Win–loss record: 0–0
- Earned run average: 4.91
- Strikeouts: 0
- Stats at Baseball Reference

Teams
- Minnesota Twins (2010); Boston Red Sox (2010)

Matthew Jacob Fox (born December 4, 1982) is an American former professional baseball pitcher. He played in Major League Baseball (MLB) for the Minnesota Twins and Boston Red Sox.

== Career ==
Fox was drafted by the Arizona Diamondbacks in the 6th round of the 2001 Major League Baseball draft, but he did not sign. He instead opted to attend the University of Central Florida, where he played for the UCF Knights baseball team. As a junior, he was named conference Pitcher of the Year. He was a first round pick (35th overall) in the 2004 Major League Baseball draft.

Fox was ranked the 11th best prospect in the Appalachian League by Baseball America in his first season in professional ball with the Elizabethton Twins. A shoulder injury kept him on the disabled list for the entire 2005 season, however, he returned in 2006 to go 4-0 with two saves and a 3.79 earned run average.

Fox has both started and pitched in relief during his minor league career, however, he was used primarily as a starter in 2009 for the Twins' Double A affiliate, the New Britain Rock Cats. He went 9-9 with a 3.58 ERA and 120 strikeouts in 2009 to help the Rock Cats to their first post season appearance since 2003.

Fox was promoted to the major leagues for the first time on September 3, 2010. He earned a no decision in his major league debut that same day, pitching 5 2/3 innings in a 4-3 win for the Twins. He was designated for assignment on September 4 to make room on the 40 man roster for Ben Revere.

On September 9, 2010, Fox was claimed off waivers by the Boston Red Sox. On September 17, 2010, he has made his debut with the Red Sox as a reliever, in a game against the Toronto Blue Jays. He was designated for assignment by the Red Sox after the season. He declared free agency after the 2011 season.

The Seattle Mariners signed Fox to a minor league contract on November 12, 2011. On May 14, 2013, the New York Mets signed Fox to minor league deal. He finished his professional career after spending the 2013 season with the Las Vegas 51s, going 8-4 with a 4.59 ERA.
