= Patrick Mazeika =

American baseball player (born 1993)

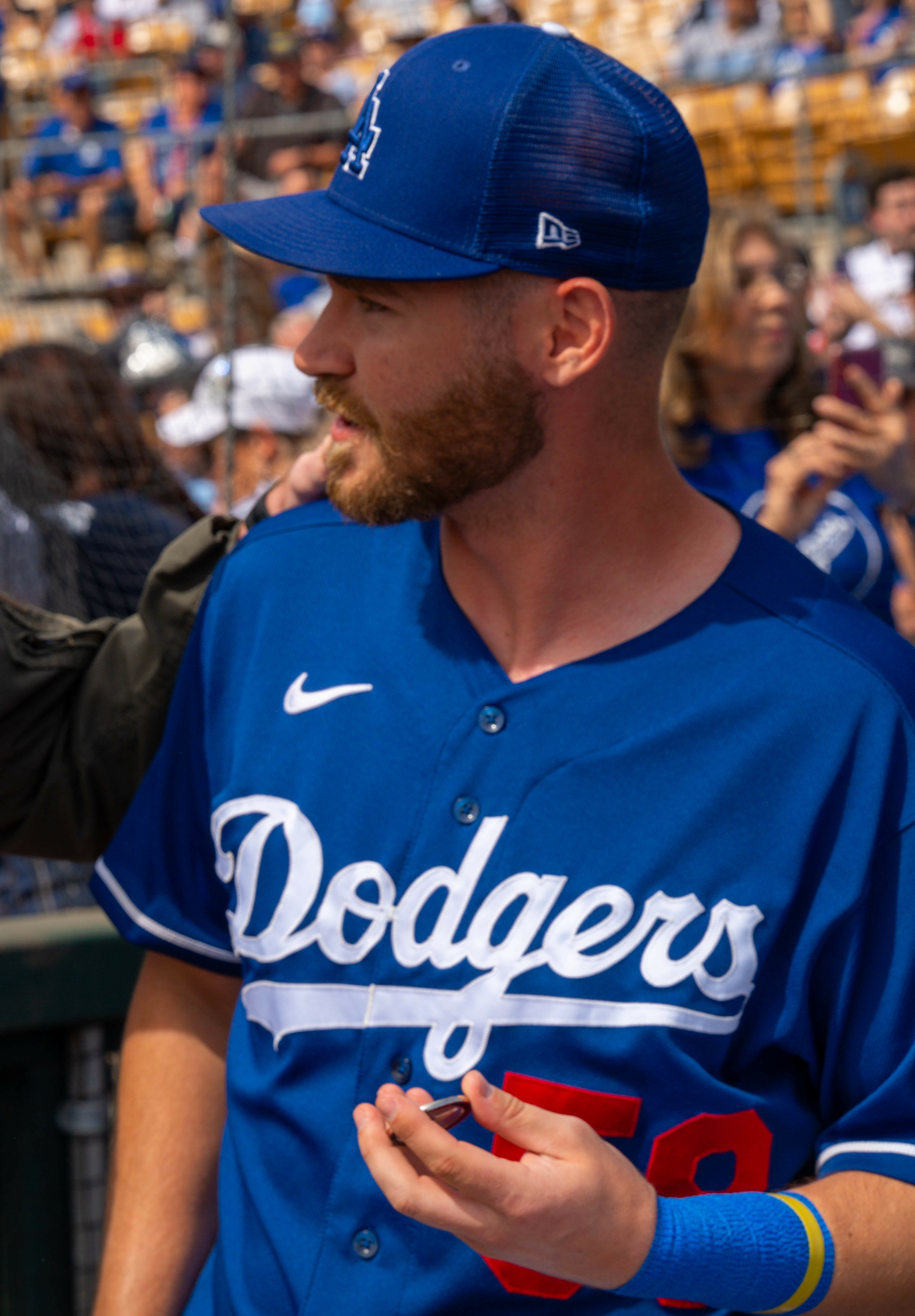
- Mazeika with the Los Angeles Dodgers during spring training in 2023

Free agent
- Catcher
- Born: October 14, 1993 (age 32); Springfield, Massachusetts, U.S.
- Bats: Left Throws: Right

MLB debut
- May 5, 2021, for the New York Mets

MLB statistics (through 2022 season)
- Batting average: .190
- Home runs: 2
- Runs batted in: 12
- Stats at Baseball Reference

Teams
- New York Mets (2021–2022)

Patrick Alan Mazeika (born October 14, 1993) is an American professional catcher player who is a free agent. He played college baseball at Stetson University, and was drafted by the New York Mets in the eighth round of the 2015 MLB draft. He made his MLB debut in 2021.

== Amateur career ==
Mazeika played varsity baseball as an eighth grader at Wilbraham & Monson Academy before transferring to Salisbury School for high school. At Salisbury, he played baseball, football and basketball. As a senior, he registered a batting average of .605.

After high school, he played college baseball at Stetson University. As a freshman, he was named the ASUN Freshman of the Year. Prior to the start of that year's conference tournament, his .392 batting average led the conference as well as all freshmen in NCAA Division I. In 2013, playing first base as a freshman, he batted .382(2nd in the Atlantic Sun Conference)/.489(1st)/.495 for Stetson, with 32 walks (10th) and 14 hit by pitch (3rd). He was named Baseball America Freshman All-America, 1st team (2013), Collegiate Baseball Louisville Slugger Freshman All-American (2013), NCBWA Freshman All-America, 1st team (2013), Atlantic Sun Conference Freshman of the Year (2013), Atlantic Sun All-Conference, 1st team (2013), and Atlantic Sun Conference All-Freshman (2013). In 2013, he played collegiate summer baseball for the Cotuit Kettleers of the Cape Cod Baseball League (CCBL),

In 2014 with Stetson, playing catcher, he batted .354 (9th in the conference)/.479 (3rd)/.471 with 18 doubles (5th), 34 walks (5th), and 17 hit by pitch (1st). He was named Atlantic Sun Conference, 2nd team (2014). He returned to the CCBL in 2014 to play for the Chatham Anglers. In 2015 with Stetson, he batted .307/.439(7th)/.485 with 53 RBIs (8th), 33 walks (6th), and 17 hit by pitch (2nd).

== Professional career ==
=== New York Mets ===
Mazeika was drafted by the New York Mets in the eighth round of the 2015 Major League Baseball draft with the 239th pick overall. He started playing in the Mets organization in 2015 with the Kingsport Mets, batting .354 (3rd in the Appalachian League)/.452 (3rd)/.540 (7th) with 44 runs (6th), 27 doubles (1st), 48 RBIs (2nd), and 17 hit by pitch (1st). He was named an Appalachian League Post-Season All-Star and an MiLB Organization All Star. He was promoted to the Columbia Fireflies in 2016, played catcher, and batted .305/.414/.402.

Mazeika then split time during the 2017 season with the St. Lucie Mets in the FSL and, later, the Binghamton Rumble Ponies, batting a combined .290/.389/.416. He was named an FSL mid-season All Star and post-season All Star. He played the next two seasons in Binghamton, and was named an Eastern League mid-season All Star in both 2018 and 2019, before a brief period in 2019 playing for the Scottsdale Scorpions of the Arizona Fall League for 25 games.

Mazeika was called up to the majors for the first time on August 25, 2020. He was then demoted to the alternate training site on August 26. Mazeika was called up for a second time on August 28, but was demoted a second time on August 29.

On May 5, 2021, Mazeika was recalled to the majors after Brandon Nimmo was placed on the injured list. Mazeika made his MLB debut that day as a pinch hitter for Miguel Castro, grounding out to St. Louis Cardinals first baseman Paul Goldschmidt in his only at-bat.

On May 7, 2021, in only his second at bat in the big leagues, Mazeika was the hero in the bottom of the 10th inning during a game against the Arizona Diamondbacks. With the bases loaded, he hit into a fielder's choice, bringing Pete Alonso home from third base. It was his first walk-off RBI, as well as his first RBI in the MLB. The Mets won the game 5–4, completing a comeback from a 4–0 deficit. Then on May 11, during an interleague game against the Baltimore Orioles, Mazeika, in his fourth Major League plate appearance, was the hero again. He had another walk-off fielder's choice ground ball in the bottom of the 9th inning that drove Jonathan Villar in to score, allowing the Mets to prevail 3–2, and becoming the first player since RBI became an official statistic in 1920 to have multiple walk-off RBI within his first four career games. Although chronologically his first hit came on May 16, 2021, when he hit a solo home run against the Tampa Bay Rays, he is actually credited with a double on April 11, 2021, during a suspended game against the Marlins that was resumed on August 31, 2021.

On August 18, 2022, Mazeika was designated for assignment by the Mets.

=== San Francisco Giants ===
On August 20, 2022, Mazeika was claimed off waivers by the San Francisco Giants. He was designated for assignment on September 12. Mazeika cleared waivers and was sent outright to Triple–A Sacramento River Cats on September 15. In 13 games in Sacramento, he hit .235/.291/.392 with 2 home runs and 6 RBI. Mazeika elected free agency following the season on November 10.

=== Los Angeles Dodgers ===
On December 13, 2022, Mazeika signed a minor league contract with the Los Angeles Dodgers. He played in 52 games for the Triple–A Oklahoma City Dodgers, hitting .214 with one home run and 17 RBI. Mazeika was released by the Dodgers organization on September 1, 2023.

=== Gastonia Baseball Club ===
On April 18, 2024, Mazeika signed with the Gastonia Baseball Club of the Atlantic League of Professional Baseball (ALPB). In 47 games for Gastonia, Mazeika hit .284/.389/.617 with 14 home runs and 42 RBI.

=== Diablos Rojos del México ===
On July 5, 2024, Mazeika's contract was purchased by the Diablos Rojos del México of the Mexican Baseball League (LMB). In 13 games, he hit .250/.357/.354 with no home runs, six RBI, and one stolen base. With the team, Mazeika won the Serie del Rey. In the playoffs, he hit .289 with four home runs.

=== Gastonia Ghost Peppers ===
On April 21, 2025, Mazeika signed with the Gastonia Ghost Peppers of the Atlantic League of Professional Baseball. In 35 appearances for Gastonia, Mazeika batted .218/.294/.347 with two home runs and 15 RBI.

=== Diablos Rojos del México (second stint) ===
On June 16, 2025, Mazeika's contract was purchased by the Diablos Rojos del México of the LMB. In 11 games for the team, he hit .371/.463/.657 with two home runs and 12 RBI. For the second straight year, Mazeika won the Serie del Rey. He became a free agent following the season.

=== Saraperos de Saltillo ===
On February 10, 2026, Mazeika signed with the Saraperos de Saltillo of the LMB. He made two appearances for Saltillo, going 0-for-5. Mazeika was released by the Saraperos on April 20.
