= Rex Brothers =

American baseball player (born 1987)

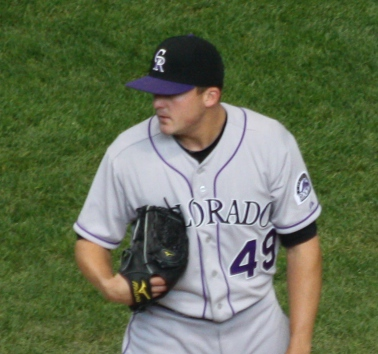
- Brothers with the Colorado Rockies
- Pitcher
- Born: December 18, 1987 (age 38); Murfreesboro, Tennessee, U.S.
- Batted: Left Threw: Left

MLB debut
- June 6, 2011, for the Colorado Rockies

Last MLB appearance
- September 30, 2021, for the Chicago Cubs

MLB statistics
- Win–loss record: 23–16
- Earned run average: 4.08
- Strikeouts: 394
- Stats at Baseball Reference

Teams
- Colorado Rockies (2011–2015); Atlanta Braves (2017–2018); Chicago Cubs (2020–2021)

Rex Colman Brothers (born December 18, 1987) is an American former professional baseball pitcher. After playing college baseball at Lipscomb University, Brothers was drafted by the Colorado Rockies in the 2009 MLB draft. He debuted with the Rockies in 2011 and played for them until 2015. He also played in Major League Baseball (MLB) for the Atlanta Braves and Chicago Cubs.

== College ==
After graduating from Shelbyville Central High School in Shelbyville, Tennessee, Brothers played baseball for Lipscomb University. In 2007, he was named conference Freshman of the Year. As a sophomore in 2008, he helped the team make its first ever NCAA Tournament appearance. The following season, he had a school-record 132 strikeouts. In 2007, he played collegiate summer baseball with the Cotuit Kettleers of the Cape Cod Baseball League, and returned to the league in 2008 to play for the Falmouth Commodores.

== Professional career ==
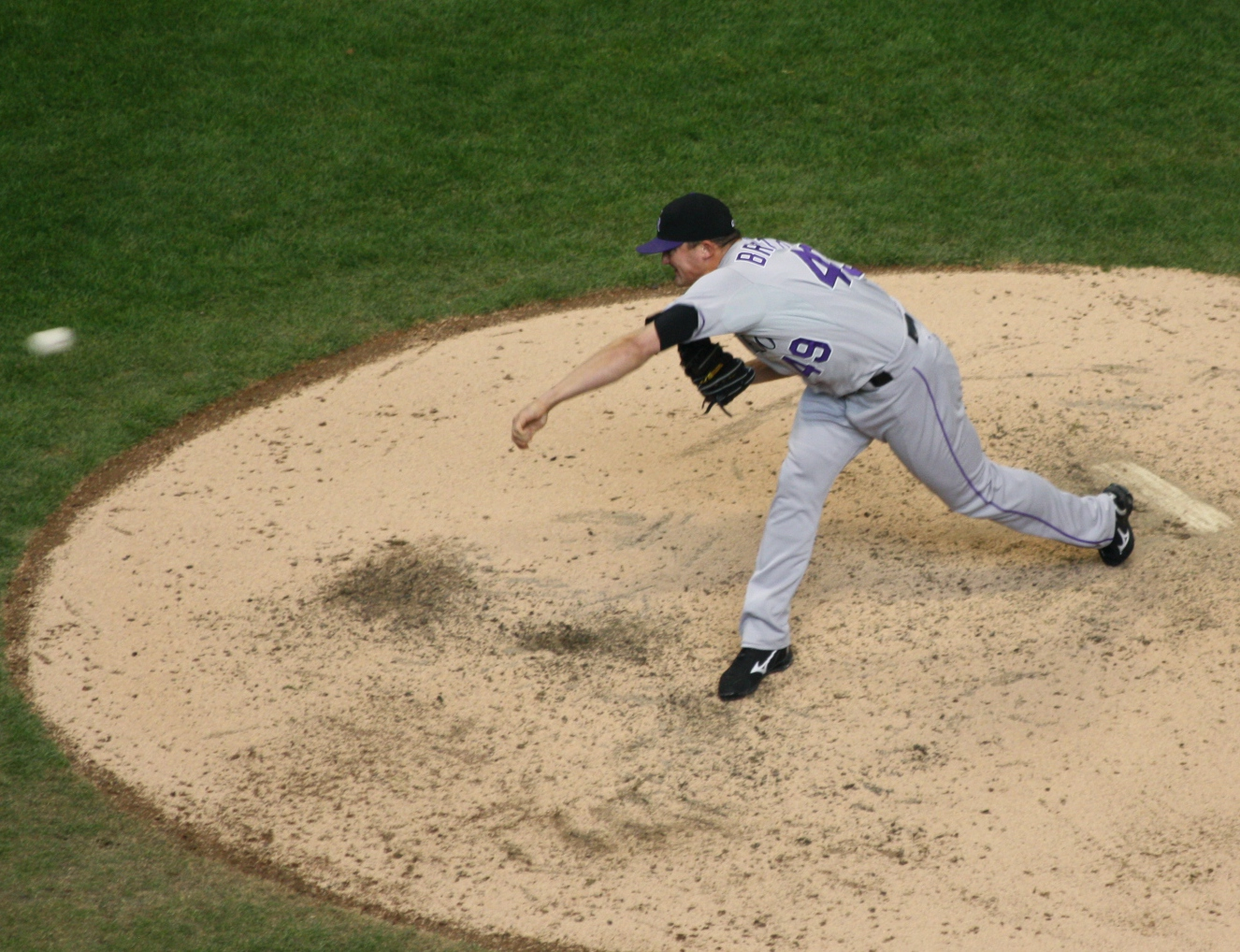
Pitching for the Rockies in 2012

=== Colorado Rockies ===
Brothers was drafted by the Colorado Rockies in the first round of the 2009 MLB draft, and he signed with the team on July 9. He then spent the 2009 and 2010 seasons in the minor leagues. In 2011, Brothers made his major league debut with the Rockies on June 6. He finished the season with a 1–2 win–loss record, a 2.88 earned run average (ERA), and 59 strikeouts in 40 2/3 innings in the majors. In 2012, he went 8–2 with a 3.86 ERA and 83 strikeouts in 67 2/3 innings.

On June 14, 2014, in a 5–4 win over the San Francisco Giants, Brothers struck out all three batters of the eighth inning on nine total pitches, becoming the 71st pitcher in major-league history to throw an immaculate inning. It was also the first immaculate inning in Rockies franchise history and the first at AT&T Park. In 2014, he went 4–6 with a 5.59 ERA and 55 strikeouts in 56 1/3 innings.

Brothers was designated for assignment by the Rockies on November 20, 2015.

=== Chicago Cubs ===
On November 25, 2015, Brothers was traded to the Chicago Cubs for minor league pitcher Wander Cabrera. He was released on March 10, 2016.

=== Atlanta Braves ===
On February 3, 2017, after not pitching in baseball in 2016, Brothers signed a minor league contract with the Atlanta Braves. On June 29, the Braves promoted Brothers to the major leagues. He made 27 appearances, accumulating an ERA of 7.23 in 23 2/3 innings. He agreed to a one-year deal with the Braves for the 2018 season in November 2017. He was outrighted to the Gwinnett Stripers on April 25, 2018. He became a free agent at the end of the season.

=== New York Yankees ===
On December 17, 2018, Brothers signed a minor league contract with the New York Yankees. He received an invitation to spring training in 2019 as a non-roster player in 2019. In 36 appearances split between the Triple–A Scranton/Wilkes-Barre RailRiders and Low–A Staten Island Yankees, he accumulated a 4.62 ERA with 88 strikeouts across 48 2/3 innings pitched. Brothers elected free agency following the season on November 4, 2019.

=== Chicago Cubs (second stint) ===
On December 18, 2019, Brothers signed a minor league contract with the Chicago Cubs. On July 23, 2020 the Cubs selected Brothers's contract, adding him to their active roster. In 3 games, he struggled to an 8.10 ERA with 8 strikeouts over 3 1/3 innings pitched. On October 30, Brothers was removed from the 40–man roster and sent outright to the Triple–A Iowa Cubs.

Later in the offseason, Brothers re-signed with the Cubs organization on a minor league contract. On March 28, 2021, Brothers was selected to the 40-man roster. In 57 games for the Cubs, Brothers posted a 5.26 ERA/4.87 FIP, struck out 75 batters, and earned one save across 53 innings. He was outrighted by the team on November 5, and elected free agency.

=== Milwaukee Brewers ===
On December 1, 2021, Brothers signed a minor league contract with the Milwaukee Brewers. He was assigned to the Triple-A Nashville Sounds to begin the 2022 season. Brothers struggled immensely to the tune of a 17.36 ERA in 7 appearances for Nashville before he was released by the Brewers on May 3, 2022.

On February 9, 2023, Brothers announced his retirement from professional baseball via his Instagram.

== Personal life ==
Brothers has one brother, Hunter, and one sister, Cortney. Hunter also pitched at Lipscomb and was drafted by the Rockies in the 30th round of the 2014 MLB draft, playing two seasons in the minor leagues.

Brothers and his wife, Jill, have three sons and a daughter, and reside in Tennessee during the off-season.
