= Justin Pope =

American baseball player and coach (born 1979)

- Pitcher
- Born: November 8, 1979 (age 46); West Palm Beach, Florida, U.S.
- Bats: Right Throws: Right
- Stats at Baseball Reference

Justin Lee Pope (born November 8, 1979) is an American professional baseball pitcher, coach, and manager. He is currently the pitching coach of the Charleston RiverDogs of the South Atlantic League - Class A. Pope played college baseball for the University of Central Florida, where he was a First Team All-American. Drafted by the St. Louis Cardinals, Pope played professionally in minor league baseball for the Cardinals, New York Yankees, and Philadelphia Phillies organizations without reaching Major League Baseball. After ending his playing career, Pope served as a coach in the Yankees farm system. On January 26, 2008 Justin wed Kimberly Ann Helscel of Miami, Florida. They currently reside in Tampa, Florida.

== Early life ==
Pope grew up in Lake Worth, Florida. His father built a baseball field on their five-acre family home when Pope was seven years old. His little league baseball team practiced on the field.

== Career ==
=== Playing career ===
Pope attended Palm Beach Lakes Community High School in West Palm Beach, Florida. As a junior, he was named the Sun-Sentinel's large-school player of the year. Redistricting after his junior year moved Pope's Lake Worth home into the district of Wellington High School in Wellington, Florida. Though he initially wanted to return to Palm Beach Lakes, his baseball coach left for another school, and Pope decided to enroll at Wellington for his senior season.

Pope enrolled at the University of Central Florida (UCF). At UCF, he played college baseball for the UCF Knights baseball team, then in the Trans America Athletic Conference (TAAC).^{[a]} In 2000, he played collegiate summer baseball with the Bourne Braves of the Cape Cod Baseball League. At UCF, Pope was named a First Team All-American, TAAC All-Star starting pitcher and TAAC Player of the Year as a junior in 2001. He set the UCF school record for strikeouts, and pitched 38 consecutive scoreless innings, breaking Roger Clemens' National Collegiate Athletic Association record of 35.

The St. Louis Cardinals drafted Pope in the first round (28th overall) of the 2001 Major League Baseball draft. He made his professional debut with the New Jersey Cardinals of the Class-A Short Season New York–Penn League in 2001, pitching to a 2-4 win–loss record and a 2.60 earned run average (ERA) in 15 games started. Pope started 12 games for the Peoria Chiefs of the Class-A Midwest League in 2002, posting win–loss record of 8-1 with a 1.35 ERA as the Chiefs won the league championship. Pope was assigned to the Palm Beach Cardinals of the Class-A Advanced Florida State League (FSL) in 2003.

The Cardinals traded Pope and Ben Julianel to the New York Yankees for Sterling Hitchcock in August 2003. The Yankees assigned Pope to the Tampa Yankees of the FSL. With the Yankees organization, Pope was converted into a relief pitcher. He was promoted to the Class-AA Trenton Thunder of the Eastern League in 2004. He received promotions to the Class-AAA affiliates of the Yankees, the Columbus Clippers in 2006 and the Scranton/Wilkes-Barre Yankees in 2007, but was never promoted to Major League Baseball. Pope signed with the Philadelphia Phillies as a minor league free agent for the 2008 season. He pitched for the Class-AA Reading Phillies of the Eastern League, and retired after the season.

=== Coaching career ===
Pope served as a coach for the Staten Island Yankees of the New York–Penn League in 2010 and the Trenton Thunder in 2011. He was named manager of Staten Island for the 2012 season. In 2015, Pope was named the pitching coach for the Pulaski Yankees of the Rookie-level Appalachian League.

== Notes ==
^{a} The Trans America Athletic Conference is now known as the Atlantic Sun Conference.
