= Danny Price (baseball coach) =

American baseball player and coach

Current position
- Title: Head coach
- Team: Miami Dade College
- Conference: Southern

Biographical details
- Born: North Carolina, U.S.
- Education: Florida International University

Playing career
- 1973–1974: FIU
- Position: Outfielder

Coaching career (HC unless noted)
- 1976–1979: FIU (asst)
- 1980–2007: FIU
- 2011–present: Miami Dade College

Head coaching record
- Tournaments: NCAA DI: 7–14

Accomplishments and honors

Awards
- 3× Trans America Athletic Coach of the Year (1991, 1995, 1998)

Danny Price is a former college baseball coach and former player. He was the head coach of the Florida International University (FIU) baseball team, a position that he held from 1980 until May 2007. During that span, he recorded a thousand coaching victories, reaching that milestone on March 10, 2005. He was then head coach at Miami Dade College from 2011 until his retirement in 2019, after which he planned to engage in charitable work.

Price, the son of a sharecropper born in North Carolina, attended FIU and played on its baseball team as a student in 1973–74. He made the first hit for FIU, which had opened its doors a year before. He graduated in 1974, and returned as a hitting instructor in 1976.

Former FIU baseball players coached by Price include Major League Baseball star Mike Lowell, and over one hundred other students signed to play professional baseball with major and minor league teams.

At FIU, he was named TAAC Coach of the Year three times.

In 2011, Price was named the head coach at Miami Dade College.

== Head coaching record ==
Record table
Season	Team	Overall	Conference	Standing	Postseason
FIU Panthers (Independent) (1980–1990)
1980	FIU	40–15			NCAA World Series
1981	FIU	41–17			
1982	FIU	51–12			NCAA Regional
1983	FIU	35–22			
1984	FIU	37–26			
1985	FIU	37–21			
1986	FIU	41–18			
1987	FIU	40–20			
1988	FIU	40–19			
1989	FIU	39–21			
1990	FIU	40–20			
FIU:		441–221			
FIU Panthers (Trans America Athletic Conference) (1991–1998)
1991	FIU	43–23	11–7	2nd (East)	NCAA Regional
1992	FIU	36–23	11–5	T-1st (East)	
1993	FIU	27–29	7–11	4th (East)	
1994	FIU	38–21	12–6	1st (East)	
1995	FIU	50–11	27–3	1st	NCAA Regional
1996	FIU	31–24	6–12	4th (South)	
1997	FIU	42–21	10–8	1st (South)	NCAA Regional
1998	FIU	41–24	13–5	1st (South)	
FIU:		308–176	97–57		
FIU Panthers (Sun Belt Conference) (1999–2007)
1999	FIU	45–18	17–16	4th	NCAA Regional
2000	FIU	42–20	15–12	3rd	NCAA Regional
2001	FIU	43–21	16–11	2nd	NCAA Regional
2002	FIU	42–19	15–13	4th	NCAA Regional
2003	FIU	37–22	12–12	5th	
2004	FIU	29–33	5–12	5th	
2005	FIU	38–21	14–10	3rd	
2006	FIU	36–24	12–12	4th	
2007	FIU	26–29	12–17	10th	
FIU:		284–207	104–115		
Total:		1,033–604			
National champion Postseason invitational champion Conference regular season champion Conference regular season and conference tournament champion Division regular season champion Division regular season and conference tournament champion Conference tournament champion
