= Kevin Nicholson (baseball) =

Canadian baseball player (born 1976)

- Shortstop
- Born: March 29, 1976 (age 50); Vancouver, British Columbia, Canada
- Batted: Both Threw: Right

MLB debut
- June 23, 2000, for the San Diego Padres

Last MLB appearance
- September 3, 2000, for the San Diego Padres

MLB statistics
- Batting average: .216
- Home runs: 1
- Runs batted in: 8
- Stats at Baseball Reference

Teams
- San Diego Padres (2000)

Kevin Ronald Nicholson (born March 29, 1976) is a Canadian former professional baseball shortstop. He played part of the 2000 season for the San Diego Padres of Major League Baseball, and for the Canadian Olympic baseball team in 2004.

== Amateur career ==
Nicholson was drafted by the California Angels in the 43rd round (1182nd overall) of the 1994 MLB draft, but did not sign, choosing instead to attend Stetson University, where he played college baseball under head coach Pete Dunn. In 1996, he played collegiate summer baseball with the Wareham Gatemen of the Cape Cod Baseball League, where he was named the league's MVP, and was elected to the league's Hall of Fame in 2026. In 1997, he was named conference Player of the Year. Nicholson was chosen in the first round, 27th overall, by the San Diego Padres in the 1997 MLB draft.

== Professional career ==
Nicholson spent three seasons in the minors, playing in 1998 and 1999 with the Class AA Mobile Bay Bears, and in 1999 had a batting average of .288 with 13 home runs and 81 RBIs. Nicholson played 37 games for the Padres in 2000.

He later spent time in the Colorado Rockies, St. Louis Cardinals, and Pittsburgh Pirates organizations, but never saw action for their major league clubs.

He was a member of the Canadian national baseball team for several years. In 2001, he was with their Baseball World Cup team, and was a member of Team Canada's fourth place team in the 2004 Summer Olympics. He played for Canada at the inaugural World Baseball Classic in 2006, being the last season in which Nicholson played professionally, appearing with the Somerset Patriots of the independent Atlantic League.

His final appearance for Team Canada came at the 2007 Baseball World Cup.

== See also ==
- List of Major League Baseball players from Canada

== Sources ==
- Career statistics from Baseball Reference · Fangraphs · Baseball Reference (Minors) · Retrosheet · Baseball Almanac
