= Barry Myers (baseball) =

American baseball coach (1938–2017)

Biographical details
- Born: September 11, 1938; New Martinsville, West Virginia, U.S.
- Died: August 10, 2017 (aged 78)
- Education: Marshall University

Playing career
- ?–1960: Marshall
- Position: Pitcher

Coaching career (HC unless noted)
- 1963: Florida State (asst.)
- 1964–1966: Miami-Dade JC (asst.)
- 1967–1973: Jacksonville
- 1974–1977: Mercer (asst.)
- 1978–2003: Mercer

Head coaching record
- Overall: 852–765–8
- Tournaments: NCAA D1: 0-2; A-Sun: 20-11; NCAA D2: 1-2

Accomplishments and honors

Championships
- TAAC Tournament: 1979, 1981, 1983; TAAC Division: 1982, 1994, 1997

Awards
- College Division District 3 Coach of the Year: 1968; TAAC Coach of the Year: 1979, 1981, 1983, 1994

Barry Myers (September 11, 1938 – August 10, 2017) was an American former college baseball and men's soccer coach. He was the head baseball coach at both Jacksonville, from 1967 to 1973, and Mercer, from 1978 to 2003. At Jacksonville, he led the Dolphins to their first two NCAA tournaments, one each in the college and University Divisions. At Mercer, he won three TAAC Tournaments and was named TAAC Coach of the Year four times. A native West Virginian, Myers attended Marshall University, where he played baseball for the Thundering Herd under head coach Bill Chambers. He was also Mercer's soccer coach from 1974 to 1976, amassing a 12–21–3 overall record.

== Coaching career ==
=== Baseball ===
==== Early career ====
After graduating from Marshall in 1960, Myers coached high school baseball in West Virginia for a few seasons. He began his college coaching career as a graduate assistant at Florida State in 1963. He then spent three seasons (1964–1966) at Miami-Dade Junior College as an assistant under Demie Mainieri. In 1964, Miami-Dade won the NJCAA National Championship.

==== Jacksonville ====
Ahead of the 1967 season, Myers was hired as the head coach at Jacksonville, then a College Division school. Myers said of the hire, "I think coaching at Jacksonville is going to be a tremendous challenge, but that's why I chose coaching as a profession, because of the challenge."

In his second season, Jacksonville had a 21–11–2 regular season to qualify for its first NCAA tournament. It went 1–2 in the District 3 Regional held in Fort Eustis, Virginia. It lost its opener to Long Island, defeated Belmont Abbey in an elimination game, and was then knocked out by Long Island. Myers was named the season's College Division District 3 Coach of the Year.

Jacksonville began playing in the large-school University Division in 1969. In 1972, it went 36–12 in the regular season to qualify for its first University Division tournament. At the District 3 Regional in Gastonia, North Carolina, the team went 0–2, losing games to Ole Miss and South Alabama.

During Myers's tenure, Jacksonville had three All-America selections and four MLB draft selections. Tom McMillan, a second-round selection of the Cleveland Indians in 1973, later played in Major League Baseball.

==== Mercer ====
Myers left Jacksonville to become an assistant at Mercer from 1974 to 1977. He was promoted to head coach to replace Claude Smith. He was Mercer's head coach from 1978 to 2003 and had an overall record of 663–677–5.

After going 32–16 in Myers' first season, 1978, Mercer joined the newly formed Trans America Athletic Conference. In its first five seasons in the league, 1979 to 1983, it had four 30-win seasons and won three TAAC Tournaments. Myers was named TAAC Coach of the Year in each of the tournament-winning seasons. The team returned to the TAAC Tournament in 1984. The Bears won three of the first four TAAC Player of the Year awards, including Craig Gibson's in 1985.

Mercer struggled from 1986 to 1993. It had three winning seasons but no winning seasons in the TAAC. In 1994, however, Myers was named Coach of the Year for the fourth time as the team won West Division and played in the conference tournament. The Bears won their division again in 1997 and appeared in another conference tournament in 1999.

Myers retired after the 2003 season. He was replaced by Gibson, who had been an assistant from 1987 to 1988 and 1994 to 2003.

During his tenure, Mercer had 13 MLB draft selections, including a high of three in both the 1983 and 1990 drafts. One former player, Mike Mimbs, went on to play in Major League Baseball.

== Head coaching record ==
Below is a table of Myers's yearly records as a collegiate head baseball coach.

Record table
| Season | Team | Overall | Conference | Standing | Postseason |
|---|---|---|---|---|---|
Jacksonville (Independent – College Division) (1967–1968)
| 1967 | Jacksonville | 21–9 | | | |
| 1968 | Jacksonville | 22–13–2 | | | NCAA Regional |
Jacksonville (Independent – University Division) (1969–1973)
| 1969 | Jacksonville | 22–13–1 | | | |
| 1970 | Jacksonville | 31–8 | | | |
| 1971 | Jacksonville | 27–14 | | | |
| 1972 | Jacksonville | 36–14 | | | NCAA Regional |
| 1973 | Jacksonville | 30–17 | | | |
| Jacksonville: | | 189–88–3 | | | |
Mercer (Independent – Division I) (1978)
| 1978 | Mercer | 32–16 | | | |
Mercer (TAAC/A-Sun (Note: After the 2001 season, the Trans America Athletic Conference renamed itself the Atlantic Sun Conference.)) (1979–2003)
| 1979 | Mercer | 38–16 | | | TAAC Tournament |
| 1980 | Mercer | 33–17 | | | TAAC Tournament |
| 1981 | Mercer | 39–12–1 | 3–4 | 2nd (East) | TAAC Tournament |
| 1982 | Mercer | 35–22 | 8–2 | 1st (East) | |
| 1983 | Mercer | 29–26–1 | | | TAAC Tournament |
| 1984 | Mercer | 23–23 | 10–6 | 2nd (East) | TAAC Tournament |
| 1985 | Mercer | 24–28 | 9–9 | 2nd (East) | |
| 1986 | Mercer | 25–24 | 8–10 | T-2nd (East) | |
| 1987 | Mercer | 27–22 | 6–9 | 3rd (East) | |
| 1988 | Mercer | 24–25 | 7–10 | 3rd (East) | |
| 1989 | Mercer | 16–35 | 4–14 | 4th (East) | |
| 1990 | Mercer | 15–34 | 2–14 | 4th (East) | |
| 1991 | Mercer | 15–31 | 2–16 | 4th (East) | |
| 1992 | Mercer | 29–20 | 8–10 | 3rd (East) | |
| 1993 | Mercer | 15–34 | 6–14 | 5th (West) | |
| 1994 | Mercer | 32–24 | 15–9 | T-1st (West) | TAAC Tournament |
| 1995 | Mercer | 15–36–2 | 9–18 | T-9th | |
| 1996 | Mercer | 25–30 | 7–11 | 4th (East) | |
| 1997 | Mercer | 36–23 | 12–6 | 1st (East) | TAAC Tournament |
| 1998 | Mercer | 27–26–1 | 7–13 | 4th (East) | |
| 1999 | Mercer | 36–24 | 19–11 | T-3rd | TAAC Tournament |
| 2000 | Mercer | 16–35 | 8–19 | 8th | |
| 2001 | Mercer | 24–28 | 10–17 | 8th | |
| 2002 | Mercer | 22–32 | 13–17 | T-6th | |
| 2003 | Mercer | 11–34 | 6–21 | 12th | |
| Mercer: | | 663–677–5 | 179–260 | | |
| Total: | | 852–765–8 | | | |
National champion Postseason invitational champion Conference regular season champion Conference regular season and conference tournament champion Division regular season champion Division regular season and conference tournament champion Conference tournament champion
