= Todd Greene =

American baseball player (born 1971)

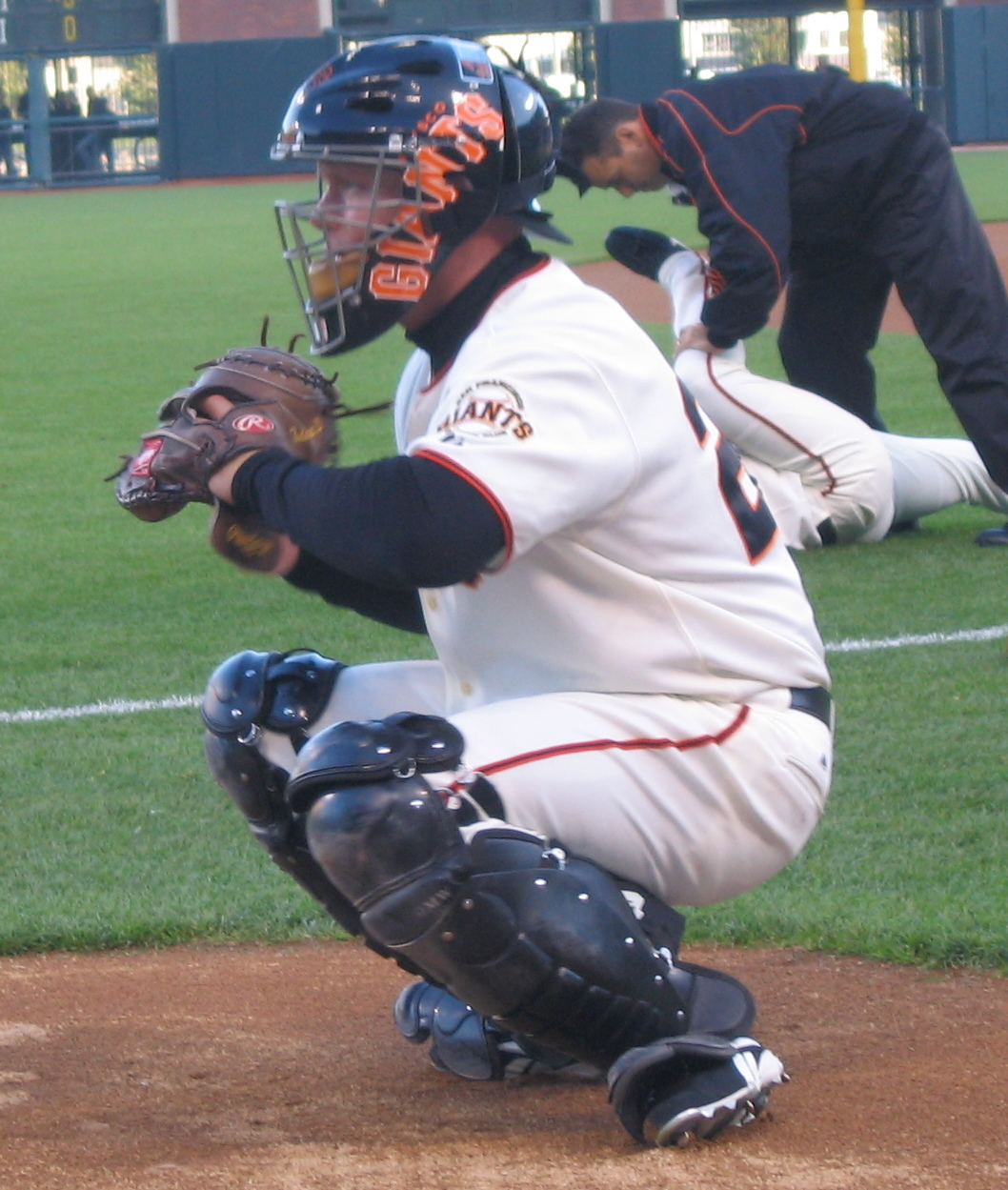
- Greene with the San Francisco Giants in 2006
- Catcher
- Born: May 8, 1971 (age 54); Augusta, Georgia, U.S.
- Batted: Right Threw: Right

MLB debut
- July 30, 1996, for the California Angels

Last MLB appearance
- October 1, 2006, for the San Francisco Giants

MLB statistics
- Batting average: .252
- Home runs: 71
- Runs batted in: 217
- Stats at Baseball Reference

Teams
- California / Anaheim Angels (1996–1999); Toronto Blue Jays (2000); New York Yankees (2001); Texas Rangers (2002–2003); Colorado Rockies (2004–2005); San Francisco Giants (2006)
Medals
Men's baseball
Representing United States
Pan American Games
Bronze medal – third place	1991 Havana	Team

Todd Anthony Greene (born May 8, 1971) is an American former professional baseball catcher. In an 11-year career, he played for the Anaheim Angels (1996–1999), Toronto Blue Jays (2000), New York Yankees (2001), Texas Rangers (2002–2003), Colorado Rockies (2004–2005), and San Francisco Giants (2006) of Major League Baseball (MLB). He batted and threw right-handed.

== Amateur career ==
Greene was born in Augusta, Georgia, and attended Evans High School in Evans, GA and went on to attend Georgia Southern University. While playing for the Eagles, he was named the TAAC Player of the Year in 1990. In 1992, he played collegiate summer baseball in the Cape Cod Baseball League for the Yarmouth-Dennis Red Sox, where he won the league's annual all-star game home run hitting contest. Greene finished his college career 3rd on the all-time home run list at 88. He was selected by the Angels in the 12th round of the 1993 MLB draft.

== Professional career ==
Greene made his major league debut for the Angels in 1996. His most productive season with the Angels came in 1999, when he played in 97 games for the big league club.

With the Yankees in 2001, he caught the ceremonial first pitch thrown by President George W. Bush prior to Game 3 of the 2001 World Series.

On May 4, 2006, while playing for the Giants in a game against the Milwaukee Brewers, Greene was seriously injured in a home-plate collision with Brewers' first baseman Prince Fielder. While Greene continued to play for the rest of the season, his shoulder had suffered serious structural damage. During spring training the next season, while with the San Diego Padres, Greene tore two muscles in his weakened rotator cuff while attempting a throw to second base. He never returned to the majors following the injury.

== Coaching, scouting and front office career ==
In 2008, he was a scout for the San Diego Padres. In January 2009, he was named a quality assurance coach for the Tampa Bay Rays.

On November 23, 2009, Greene joined the Seattle Mariners as a Major League scout. In 2013 he then became the Special Assistant to the General Manager, handling trades and acquisitions for the Arizona Diamondbacks.
