= Brooks Wilson =

American baseball player (born 1996)

- Pitcher
- Born: March 15, 1996 (age 30); Lakeland, Florida, U.S.
- Bats: Left Throws: Right
- Stats at Baseball Reference

Brooks Harrison Wilson (born March 15, 1996) is an American former professional baseball pitcher. Prior to playing professionally, Wilson attended Stetson University, where he played college baseball for the Stetson Hatters.

Wilson starred in baseball for Lakeland Christian School. In college, Wilson was named an All-American in 2018, and won the John Olerud Award in 2018. The Braves selected him in the seventh round with the 202nd overall selection in the 2018 MLB draft.

== Amateur career ==
Wilson attended Lakeland Christian School in Lakeland, Florida, his freshman, junior and senior seasons. He also attended Lakeland High School as a sophomore. Wilson was named first-team All-Polk County as a designated hitter in 2014. He recorded a .493 batting average and 27 RBIs, while also getting 6 wins, 104 strikeouts and a 1.02 ERA on the mound as a senior. Wilson then chose to enroll at Stetson University to play college baseball for the Stetson Hatters baseball team.

As a freshman at Stetson University in 2015, Wilson had a 9–5 record, a 4.39 Earned run average (ERA), and held opponents to a .289 batting average, with three home runs. He was named a freshman All-American by Louisville Slugger and the Atlantic Sun Conference (ASUN) All-Freshman Team and Second Team All-Conference. Following his freshman season at Stetson, Wilson played collegiate summer baseball for the Waynesboro Generals of the Valley Baseball League.

As a sophomore in 2016, Wilson had a 5–6 record with a 2.90 ERA. He had one at bat in which he struck out. That summer, Wilson was selected by the Orleans Firebirds of the Cape Cod Baseball League. Wilson made just two starts and for the Firebirds. He had a 1.50 ERA, 4 strikeouts and 5 walks.

In the 2017 season as a junior, Wilson had 127 strikeouts in 107.2 innings to lead the ASUN, while also achieving a 3.01 ERA. The Texas Rangers selected him in the 24th round of the 2017 MLB draft, but he opted to return to Stetson for his senior year. Once Wilson decided to return to Stetson, he also re-signed with the Orleans Firebirds, where he pitched in 12 games total, with two starts, with a 2–1 record with a 2.13 ERA in 25.1 innings, also picked up a pair of saves.

As a senior, in 2018, Wilson had 20 saves to lead the nation. Wilson had moved to the bullpen in 2018, which also allowed the Hatters to use Wilson as a designated hitter. Wilson batted .299 with a .455 SLG, 3 home runs, and 35 RBIs. He was named first team All-ASUN and he was also named the ASUN Player of the Year. Wilson won the John Olerud Award, which is awarded to the top collegiate two-way player in the nation. He was also named a Baseball America and Collegiate Baseball Newspaper All-American.

== Professional career ==
The Atlanta Braves selected him in the seventh round, with the 202nd overall selection, of the 2018 MLB draft. Wilson began his professional career with the Danville Braves of the Low-A Appalachian League. He made 17 appearances split between Danville and the Single-A Rome Braves in his debut campaign, posting a 3–2 record and 1.30 ERA with 25 strikeouts in 27.2 innings of work.

In 2019, Wilson spent the year with the High-A Florida Fire Frogs, working to a 4–3 record and 2.47 ERA with 73 strikeouts in 87.1 innings pitched. Wilson did not play in a game in 2020 due to the cancellation of the minor league season because of the COVID-19 pandemic. For the 2021 season, Wilson split time between the Double-A Mississippi Braves and the Triple-A Gwinnett Stripers, pitching to a 3–1 record and 2.34 ERA with 84 strikeouts in 50.0 innings of work.

On November 18, 2021, the Braves placed Wilson on the 40-man roster. On April 11, 2022, it was announced that Wilson had undergone Tommy John surgery and would miss the 2022 season as a result. On November 18, Wilson was non–tendered by the Braves and became a free agent.

Wilson re–signed with the Braves on a minor league contract on November 22, 2022. He split the 2023 campaign between Gwinnett, Mississippi, Rome, and the rookie–level Florida Complex League Braves, accumulating a 2–0 record and 2.70 ERA with 18 strikeouts across 11 total appearances.

Wilson split 2024 between Mississippi and Gwinnett, compiling a 4–3 record and 4.98 ERA with 63 strikeouts across 30 appearances out of the bullpen. Wilson was released by the Braves organization on September 20, 2024.
