= Chris Hayes (baseball) =

American baseball player & coach (born 1973)

Current position
- Title: Head coach
- Team: Jacksonville
- Conference: ASUN
- Record: 284–248

Biographical details
- Born: December 23, 1973 (age 52); Jacksonville, Florida, U.S.

Playing career
- 1992–1995: Jacksonville
- 1995: St. Catharines Blue Jays
- 1996: Hagerstown Suns
- 1996–1997: Dunedin Blue Jays
- 1998: Hagerstown Suns
- 1999: Knoxville Smokies
- 1999: Dunedin Blue Jays
- Position: Third baseman

Coaching career (HC unless noted)
- 2002–2003: Jacksonville (Florida) Wolfson (asst.)
- 2004–2008: Jacksonville (asst.)
- 2009–2013: Seminole State College of Florida
- 2014–2016: Jacksonville (asst.)
- 2017–present: Jacksonville

Head coaching record
- Overall: 284–248 (NCAA) 89–99 (NJCAA)
- Tournaments: ASUN: 17–16; NCAA: 1–4

Accomplishments and honors

Championships
- ASUN Regular season (2017); ASUN Tournament (2021)

Awards
- ASUN Coach of the Year (2017)

Christopher Andrew Hayes (born December 23, 1973) is an American college baseball coach and former third baseman who is currently the head baseball coach at Jacksonville University. Hayes previously played college baseball at Jacksonville for coach Terry Alexander from 1992–1995.

== Amateur career ==
Hayes attended Englewood High School in Jacksonville, Florida. Hayes then enrolled at Jacksonville University, to play college baseball for the Jacksonville Dolphins baseball team.

As a freshman at Jacksonville in 1992, Hayes had a .303 batting average, a .362 on-base percentage (OBP) and a .423 SLG.

As a sophomore in 1993, Hayes batted .361 with a .549 SLG, 4 home run, and 37 RBIs.

In the 1994 season as a junior, Hayes hit .369 with a .552 SLG, 5 home run, and 49 RBIs. Hayes was drafted in the 35th round of the 1994 Major League Baseball draft by the Seattle Mariners, but Hayes opted to return to Jacksonville for his senior season.

Hayes had his best season as a senior in 1995, hitting a career high in doubles (12), home runs (7), RBIs (60) and slugged (.479).

== Professional career ==
Hayes was drafted by the Toronto Blue Jays in the 28th round of the 1995 Major League Baseball draft. Hayes played five years in the Blue Jays organization, having played for the St. Catharines Blue Jays, Hagerstown Suns, Dunedin Blue Jays and Knoxville Smokies.

== Coaching career ==
In 2001, Hayes joined the coaching staff at Wolfson High School in Jacksonville. In the fall of 2003, Hayes joined his alma mater, the Jacksonville Dolphins staff. In late 2008, Hayes was named the head coach at Seminole State College of Florida.

On June 24, 2016, Hayes was named the head coach of the Jacksonville program.

== Head coaching record ==
Record table
Season	Team	Overall	Conference	Standing	Postseason
Seminole State College (FL) Raiders (Mid-Florida Conference) (2009–2012)
2009	Seminole State College (FL)	23–27			
2010	Seminole State College (FL)	21–25	12–12		
2011	Seminole State College (FL)	26–20			
2012	Seminole State College (FL)	19–27	9–14		
2013	Seminole State College (FL)	36-14	18-6		
Seminole State College (FL) (NJCAA):		125–113	39–32		
Jacksonville Dolphins (ASUN Conference) (2017–present)
2017	Jacksonville	36–24	16–5	1st	ASUN tournament
2018	Jacksonville	40–21	14–6	2nd	NCAA Regional
2019	Jacksonville	32–27	13–11	T-4th	ASUN tournament
2020	Jacksonville	9–9			Season canceled on March 12 due to Coronavirus pandemic
2021	Jacksonville	16–34	3–15	4th (4th)	NCAA Regional
2022	Jacksonville	27–28	13–16	4th (East)	ASUN tournament
2023	Jacksonville	34–24	17–13	5th	ASUN tournament
2024	Jacksonville	27–31	19–12	5th	ASUN tournament
2025	Jacksonville	30–26	17–13	2nd (Graphite)	ASUN tournament
2026	Jacksonville	30–24	16–14	3rd (Graphite)	ASUN tournament
Jacksonville:		284–248	142–105		
Total:		284–248			
National champion Postseason invitational champion Conference regular season champion Conference regular season and conference tournament champion Division regular season champion Division regular season and conference tournament champion Conference tournament champion

== See also ==
- List of current NCAA Division I baseball coaches
