= Jacksonville Dolphins baseball =

- 2026 Jacksonville Dolphins baseball team
- Founded: 1957; 69 years ago
- Overall record: 1,858–1,529–8
- University: Jacksonville University
- Head coach: Chris Hayes (10th season)
- Conference: Atlantic Sun Conference; Graphite Division
- Location: Jacksonville, Florida
- Home stadium: John Sessions Stadium (Capacity: 1,750)
- Nickname: Dolphins
- Colors: Green and white

NCAA tournament appearances
- 1972, 1976, 1989, 1991, 1994, 1995, 1999, 2001, 2003, 2006, 2007, 2009, 2011, 2018, 2021

Conference tournament champions
- 1989, 1999, 2003, 2007, 2009, 2021

Conference regular season champions
- 1990, 1995, 2006, 2017

The Jacksonville Dolphins baseball team represents Jacksonville University, which is located in Jacksonville, Florida. The Dolphins are an NCAA Division I college baseball program that competes in the Atlantic Sun Conference. They began competing in Division I in 1969 and joined the Atlantic Sun Conference in 1999 after 20 years in the Sun Belt Conference.

The Jacksonville Dolphins play all home games on-campus at John Sessions Stadium. Since their promotion to Division I in 1969, the Dolphins have played in 14 NCAA tournaments, advancing as far as the regional final in 1976. Over their 20 seasons in the Sun Belt Conference, they won two conference regular season titles and one conference tournament. Over their 21 seasons in the Atlantic Sun Conference (formerly the Trans America Athletic Conference), they have won two conference regular season titles and four conference tournaments.

Since the program's inception in 1957, 12 Dolphins have gone on to play in Major League Baseball, highlighted by three-time All-Star Daniel Murphy.

== Jacksonville in the NCAA Tournament ==
Year	Record	Pct	Notes
1972	0–2	.000	District 3
1976	2–2	.500	South Regional
1989	1–2	.333	South Regional
1991	0–2	.000	East Regional
1994	2–2	.500	Atlantic II Regional
1995	0–2	.000	East Regional
1999	1–2	.333	Tallahassee Regional
2001	1–2	.333	Tallahassee Regional
2003	0–2	.000	Tallahassee Regional
2006	1–2	.333	Athens Regional
2007	0–2	.000	Chapel Hill Regional
2009	1–2	.333	Gainesville Regional
2011	1–2	.333	Gainesville Regional
2018	1–2	.333	Gainesville Regional
2021	0–2	.000	Columbia Regional
TOTALS	11–30	.268	

== Head coaches ==
Name	Years	Won	Lost	Tied	Pct.
Bob Daughton	1957–1965	61	120	2	.339
Charlie Mathews	1966	17	12	0	.586
Barry Myers	1967–1973	189	88	3	.680
Jack Lamabe	1974–1978	157	137	0	.534
Tom Bradley	1979–1990	430	292	1	.595
Terry Alexander	1991–2013	730	628	2	.538
Tim Montez	2014–2016	80	85	0	.485
Chris Hayes	2017–Present	221	198	0	.527

== Year-by-year record ==
Statistics overview
Season	Coach	Overall	Conference	Standing	Postseason
Bob Daughton (District III Independent) (1957–1961)
1957	Bob Daughton	9–6	–	–	
1958	Bob Daughton	6–12	–	–	
1959	Bob Daughton	5–9	–	–	
1960	Bob Daughton	3–8–1	–	–	
1961	Bob Daughton	6–11	–	–	
Bob Daughton (Florida Intercollegiate Conference) (1962–1962)
1962	Bob Daughton	12–11–1	8–7	3rd	
Bob Daughton (District III Independent) (1963–1965)
1963	Bob Daughton	10–18	–	–	
1964	Bob Daughton	5–22	–	–	
1965	Bob Daughton	5–23	–	–	
Bob Daughton:		61–120–2 (.339)			
Charlie Mathews (District III Independent) (1966–1966)
1966	Charlie Mathews	17–12	–	–	
Charlie Mathews:		17–12 (.586)			
Barry Myers (District III Independent) (1967–1973)
1967	Barry Myers	21–9	–	–	
1968	Barry Myers	22–13–2	–	–	NCAA East Regional
1969	Barry Myers	22–13–1	–	–	
1970	Barry Myers	31–8	–	–	
1971	Barry Myers	27–14	–	–	
1972	Barry Myers	36–14	–	–	
1973	Barry Myers	30–17	–	–	
Barry Myers:		189–88–3 (.680)			
Jack Lamabe (Independent) (1974–1977)
1974	Jack Lamabe	18–37	–	–	
1975	Jack Lamabe	21–35	–	–	
1976	Jack Lamabe	45–14	–	–	NCAA Tallahassee Regional
1977	Jack Lamabe	38–23	–	–	
Jack Lamabe (Sun Belt Conference) (1978–1978)
1978	Jack Lamabe	35–28	–	3rd	
Jack Lamabe:		157–137 (.534)			
Tom Bradley (Sun Belt Conference) (1979–1990)
1979	Tom Bradley	27–25	–	4th	
1980	Tom Bradley	23–33	–	5th	
1981	Tom Bradley	28–30	2–6	3rd (South)	
1982	Tom Bradley	39–20	2–6	3rd (South)	
1983	Tom Bradley	38–19	11–6	2nd (East)	
1984	Tom Bradley	39–20	9–8	3rd (East)	
1985	Tom Bradley	41–28–1	10–8	2nd (East)	
1986	Tom Bradley	38–26	12–5	1st (East)	
1987	Tom Bradley	34–25	9–7	2nd (East)	
1988	Tom Bradley	39–24	11–6	2nd (East)	
1989	Tom Bradley	42–22	10–6	1st (East)	NCAA South Regional
1990	Tom Bradley	42–20	13–5	1st (East)	
Tom Bradley:		430–292–1 (.595)			
Terry Alexander (Sun Belt Conference) (1979–1998)
1991	Terry Alexander	43–21–2	11–6	1st (East)	NCAA Gainesville Regional
1992	Terry Alexander	26–30	9–12	4th (East)	
1993	Terry Alexander	33–26	11–10	T–2nd (East)	
1994	Terry Alexander	40–24	16–8	2nd (East)	NCAA Tallahassee Regional
1995	Terry Alexander	41–22	21–6	1st	NCAA Clemson Regional
1996	Terry Alexander	23–34	12–14	5th	
1997	Terry Alexander	32–22	13–14	7th	
1998	Terry Alexander	31–27	13–14	6th	
Terry Alexander (Trans America Athletic Conference/Atlantic Sun Conference/ASUN Conference) (1999–2013)
1999	Terry Alexander	41–23	22–8	2nd	Tallahassee Regional
2000	Terry Alexander	34–24	16–11	4th	
2001	Terry Alexander	39–25	18–9	3rd	
2002	Terry Alexander	27–31	15–15	5th	
2003	Terry Alexander	32–30	17–16	6th	NCAA Tallahassee Regional
2004	Terry Alexander	25–31	12–18	8th	
2005	Terry Alexander	23–31	13–17	T–7th	
2006	Terry Alexander	43–19	23–7	1st	NCAA Athens Regional
2007	Terry Alexander	34–28	15–12	4th	NCAA Chapel Hill Regional
2008	Terry Alexander	27–29	13–20	10th	
2009	Terry Alexander	37–22	19–11	3rd	NCAA Gainesville Regional
2010	Terry Alexander	27–29	14–12	5th	
2011	Terry Alexander	37–24	19–11	2nd	NCAA Gainesville Regional
2012	Terry Alexander	18–38	7–20	10th	
2013	Terry Alexander	17–38	8–19	9th	
Terry Alexander:		730–628–2 .538			
Tim Montez (ASUN Conference) (2014–2016)
2014	Tim Montez	21–33	13–13	6th	
2015	Tim Montez	26–30	12–9	4th	
2016	Tim Montez	33–22	14–7	3rd	
Tim Montez:		80–85 (.485)			
Chris Hayes (ASUN Conference) (2017–present)
2017	Chris Hayes	36–24	16–5	1st	
2018	Chris Hayes	40–21	14–6	2nd	NCAA Gainesville Regional
2019	Chris Hayes	32–27	13–11	4th	
2020	Chris Hayes	9–9	–		
2021	Chris Hayes	16–34	3–15	4th (South)	NCAA Columbia Regional
2022	Chris Hayes	27–28	13–16	4th (East)	
2023	Chris Hayes	34–24	17–13	5th	
Chris Hayes:		194–167 (.537)			
Total:		1,858-1,529-8			
National champion Postseason invitational champion Conference regular season champion Conference regular season and conference tournament champion Division regular season champion Division regular season and conference tournament champion Conference tournament champion

== Jacksonville Dolphins Hall of Fame ==
Jacksonville has 16 members in their Hall of Fame

Player	Position	Years at Jacksonville
Gus Bell	SS/OF/C	1967–1970
Tom Bradley	Coach	1979–1990
Ernie Carr	2B	1985–1988
Guy Ezzell	OF/1B/3B/P	1969–1972
Bill Jackson	P	1958–1961
Rich Katz	3B	1971–1974
Jack Lamabe	Coach	1974–1978
Gene Mendes	P	1969–1970
Tom McMillan	SS	1970–1973
Daniel Murphy	2B	2004–2006
Chad Oliva	OF	1999–2002
Al 'Rocky' Rausch	3B/SS	1974–1977
Paul Runge	3B/2B	1977–1979
Rick Shannon	3B	1970–1973
Roger Strickland	P/OF	1961–1963
Terry Alexander	Coach	1991–2013
