= Roland Fanning =

American baseball player and coach (born 1983)

Current position
- Title: Head coach
- Team: Austin Peay
- Conference: UAC
- Record: 130–98

Biographical details
- Born: April 12, 1983 (age 43)
- Education: Coalgate High School, Southeastern Oklahoma State University

Playing career
- 2002: Carl Albert State
- 2003: Northern Oklahoma Enid
- 2004–2006: Southeastern Oklahoma
- Position: Outfielder

Coaching career (HC unless noted)
- 2008–2012: Southeastern Oklahoma (asst)
- 2013–2014: Oklahoma State (asst)
- 2015–2016: Little Rock (RC)
- 2017–2019: Kentucky (RC)
- 2023–present: Austin Peay

Administrative career (AD unless noted)
- 2020–2022: Oklahoma State (DoPD)

Head coaching record
- Overall: 130–98
- Tournaments: NCAA: 0–0

Accomplishments and honors

Championships
- 2 ASUN regular season (2024, 2025); ASUN Gold Division (2025)

Awards
- 2× Atlantic Sun Coach of the Year (2024, 2025)

Roland Lee Fanning (born April 12, 1983) is a baseball coach and former player, who is the current head baseball coach of the Austin Peay Governors. He played college baseball at Carl Albert State, Northern Oklahoma Enid and Southeastern Oklahoma.

== Playing career ==
Fanning grew up in Lehigh, Coal County, Oklahoma, where he attended Coalgate High School, where he excelled as a Center fielder and was selected as All-State baseball player for the Wildcats, and earn letters in football, basketball, and track.

On the gridiron for the Wildcats, Fanning dominated as a wide receiver and defensive back. During his junior season he set an Oklahoma Class A record for most receptions (90) in a single season, this record stood for 21 years. As a Senior, Fanning was selected as District’s Defensive Most Value Player along with Special Team Player of the Year. In his high school football career Fanning had 136 receptions, 2184 receiving yards, and 21 receiving touchdowns.

Fanning was a multi season starter for the basketball team and participated in the 4x100 metres relay.

After high school, Fanning played college baseball at Carl Albert State and Northern Oklahoma Enid for a year apiece, before finishing his career as a two-year starter for Southeastern Oklahoma.

== Coaching career ==
Fanning began his coaching career at the conclusion of his playing career, joining the staff of his alma mater, Southeastern Oklahoma. He would spend 5 years with the Savage Storm, helping them win the Lone Star Conference championship in 2011. In the fall of 2012, Fanning was named the volunteer assistant for the Oklahoma State Cowboys.

In July, 2014, Fanning joined the Little Rock Trojans staff, to serve as an assistant coach and recruiting coordinator. Just two years later, Fanning left Little Rock for the same position with Kentucky. He returned to Oklahoma State from 2020 to 2022, where he served as the Director of Baseball Operations.

In late May 2022, Fanning was named the 12th head baseball coach of the Austin Peay Governors.

== Head coaching record ==
Record table
Season	Team	Overall	Conference	Standing	Postseason
Austin Peay Governors (ASUN Conference) (2023–2026)
2023	Austin Peay	26–32	15–15	T-7th	
2024	Austin Peay	35–21	20–10	T-1st	ASUN tournament
2025	Austin Peay	45–14	26–4	1st (Gold)	ASUN tournament
2026	Austin Peay	24–31	14–16	4th (Gold)	ASUN tournament
Austin Peay:		130–98	75–45		
Total:		130–98			
National champion Postseason invitational champion Conference regular season champion Conference regular season and conference tournament champion Division regular season champion Division regular season and conference tournament champion Conference tournament champion
