= Pete Dunn =

American baseball coach

Biographical details
- Born: June 26, 1948 (age 78)

Playing career
- 1967–1968: Brevard
- 1969–1970: Stetson
- Position: Catcher

Coaching career (HC unless noted)
- 1972–1973: Georgia Southern (asst.)
- 1974–1976: Apopka HS
- 1977–1979: Stetson (asst.)
- 1980–2016: Stetson

Head coaching record
- Overall: 1,310–887–3 (.596)

Pete Dunn (born June 26, 1948) is a retired American college baseball coach who was most recently the head coach of the Stetson Hatters baseball team.

== Stetson career ==
Dunn has been the head coach of Stetson's Baseball team for 33 years, and in that time, 72 Stetson players have gone on the play Professional baseball. On July 10, 2013, Dunn received a four-year contract extension that will take him through the 2017 season. In January 2014, he will be inducted into the American Baseball Coaches Hall of Fame held at the ABCA Convention in Dallas, Texas. His career record through 2013 is 1,229–793–3 over 34 seasons. He also has eight Atlantic Sun Conference championships, 16 NCAA Regional appearances and six A-Sun coach of the year awards. He is ranked eighth on the active Division I coaches wins list and as of January 2013, 28 in College Baseball History with the most games won, at that time 1202. Dunn retired in December 2016.

== Head coaching record ==
The following is a table of Dunn's yearly records as a collegiate head baseball coach.

Record table
Season	Team	Overall	Conference	Standing	Postseason
Stetson Hatters (Independent) (1980–1985)
1980	Stetson	34–18			
1981	Stetson	36–20			
1982	Stetson	40–18			NCAA Regional
1983	Stetson	31–20			
1984	Stetson	46–13			NCAA Regional
1985	Stetson	36–22			
Stetson Hatters (Trans America Athletic Conference/Atlantic Sun Conference (Note: From 1986–2001, the Atlantic Sun Conference was known as the Trans America Athletic Conference.)) (1986–2016)
1986	Stetson	36–22	N/A (Note: In Stetson's first year of TAAC play, it was not eligible for the conference's postseason, so its record did not count towards divisional or conference standings.)		
1987	Stetson	37–22	12–6	2nd (East)	
1988	Stetson	35–26	9–8	2nd (East)	NCAA Regional
1989	Stetson	38–23	13–5	1st (East)	NCAA Regional
1990	Stetson	33–31	10–8	2nd (East)	NCAA Regional
1991	Stetson	36–22–1	13–5	1st (East)	
1992	Stetson	38–21	13–5	t-1st (East)	NCAA Regional
1993	Stetson	38–17	11–7	1st (East)	
1994	Stetson	37–21	9–9	2nd (East)	
1995	Stetson	34–25	19–11	3rd	
1996	Stetson	42–23	12–6	1st (South)	NCAA Regional
1997	Stetson	37–26–1	10–8	t-1st (South)	NCAA Regional
1998	Stetson	30–31–1	9–12	3rd (South)	
1999	Stetson	23–31	11–19	9th	
2000	Stetson	48–16	20–7	t-2nd	NCAA Regional
2001	Stetson	43–17	19–8	2nd	NCAA Regional
2002	Stetson	42–19	19–9	3rd	NCAA Regional
2003	Stetson	41–24	21–12	2nd	NCAA Regional
2004	Stetson	36–23	20–10	t-2nd	
2005	Stetson	35–28	16–14	4th	NCAA Regional
2006	Stetson	38–24	16–14	4th	NCAA Regional
2007	Stetson	42–21	21–6	1st	NCAA Regional
2008	Stetson	26–33	15–18	t-8th	
2009	Stetson	27–30	16–14	5th	
2010	Stetson	27–31	14–13	6th	
2011	Stetson	43–20	23–7	1st	NCAA Regional
2012	Stetson	35–23	15–12	t-4th	
2013	Stetson	26–31	15–12	5th	
2014	Stetson	26–34	13–14	7th	
2015	Stetson	29–30	12–9	t-3rd	
2016	Stetson	29–31	9–12	t-5th	NCAA Regional
Stetson:		1,310–887–3	435–300		
Total:		1,310–887–3			
National champion Postseason invitational champion Conference regular season champion Conference regular season and conference tournament champion Division regular season champion Division regular season and conference tournament champion Conference tournament champion

== See also ==
- List of college baseball career coaching wins leaders
