= Jake Noll =

American baseball player (born 1994)

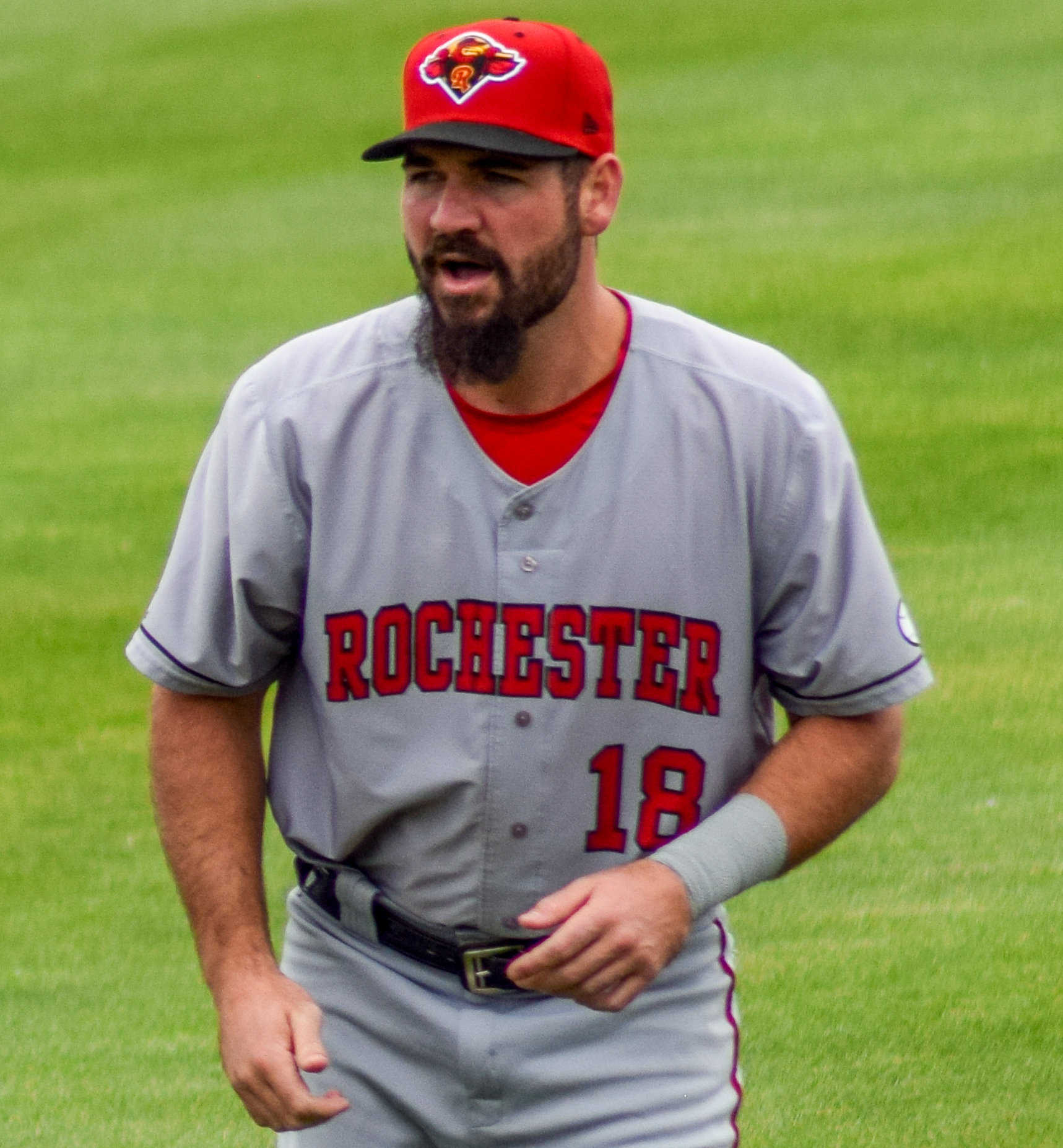
- Noll with the Rochester Red Wings in 2021
- Third baseman / First baseman
- Born: March 8, 1994 (age 32); Port Charlotte, Florida, U.S.
- Batted: Right Threw: Right

MLB debut
- March 30, 2019, for the Washington Nationals

Last MLB appearance
- September 27, 2020, for the Washington Nationals

MLB statistics
- Batting average: .276
- Home runs: 0
- Runs batted in: 2
- Stats at Baseball Reference

Teams
- Washington Nationals (2019–2020)

Jacob Carl Noll (born March 8, 1994) is an American former professional baseball infielder. He played in Major League Baseball (MLB) for the Washington Nationals.

== Career ==
=== College ===
Noll did not receive a Division I baseball scholarship out of Charlotte High School in Punta Gorda, Florida, where he hit just one home run during his playing career. He was accepted onto the Eagles baseball team at Florida Gulf Coast University as a walk-on player in 2014. That year, he was named the Louisville Slugger National Freshman of the Year, among other honors. He played for the Lakeshore Chinooks in the collegiate summer baseball Northwoods League in 2014, contributing to their championship drive. In 2015, he played collegiate summer baseball with the Hyannis Harbor Hawks of the Cape Cod Baseball League, where he was named a league all-star. In 2016, he was named the ASUN Conference Player of the Year.

=== Professional ===
The Nationals selected Noll in the seventh round of the 2016 Major League Baseball draft, making him the fifth-highest draft pick in Florida Gulf Coast history and the second-highest among position players. Many prognosticators had expected him to be drafted a round or two higher. Noll chose to sign with the Nationals and was named among the organization's Minor League Baseball All-Stars at the end of the 2016 season, progressing from the Low–A Auburn Doubledays up to the Single–A Hagerstown Suns over the course of his campaign. Noll continued his development in 2017, ending the year with the High–A Potomac Nationals. Noll was one of six Potomac Nationals honored as Carolina League All-Stars in 2018. He played for the Salt River Rafters in the Arizona Fall League following the 2018 season.

Primarily a second baseman in 2016 and 2017, Noll played mostly corner infield positions in 2018. After the 2018 season, MLB Pipeline ranked him as the Nationals' 31st-best prospect; in April 2019, he moved to 27th on the list.

Noll received a non-roster invitation to major league spring training in the 2019 preseason. A strong spring performance saw him stand alone as the last non-roster player in major league camp by the final day of spring action in Florida. After fellow infielder Adrián Sánchez was optioned to the Triple–A Fresno Grizzlies following the final spring training game, the Nationals selected Noll's contract and promoted him to the roster for Opening Day.

Noll made his debut as a pinch-hitter against the New York Mets on March 30, 2019, grounding out on a high chopper. In his third major league at-bat, on April 3, he worked a bases-loaded walk against Philadelphia Phillies reliever David Robertson for a walk-off win in the ninth inning.

On April 24, 2019, Noll started his first major league game against the Colorado Rockies at Coors Field. He recorded his first major league hit the same day, an RBI double off of Rockies pitcher Germán Márquez. In 8 games with the Nationals, Noll had a .167 average and 2 RBI. The Nationals finished the 2019 year 93–69, clinching a wild card spot, and eventually winning the World Series over the Houston Astros. Noll was not part of the postseason run, but still won his first world championship.

In 2020, Noll began the season at the alternate training site, but was promoted in late September and finished the season with a slash line of .353/.353/.412 in 17 at-bats, notching 6 hits and no RBI. On March 27, 2021, Noll was designated for assignment by the Nationals. He was outrighted to Triple–A Rochester on March 30.

Noll spent the entirety of the 2021 season with the Triple–A Rochester Red Wings, playing in 119 contests and batting .300/.346/.494 with 17 home runs and 69 RBI. He returned to Rochester in 2022, making 103 appearances and hitting .256/.307/.415 with 10 home runs and 53 RBI. Noll played in 54 games for Triple–A Rochester in 2023, batting .247/.305/.418 with six home runs and 30 RBI. He elected free agency following the season on November 6, 2023.
