= Whigham, Georgia =

- City
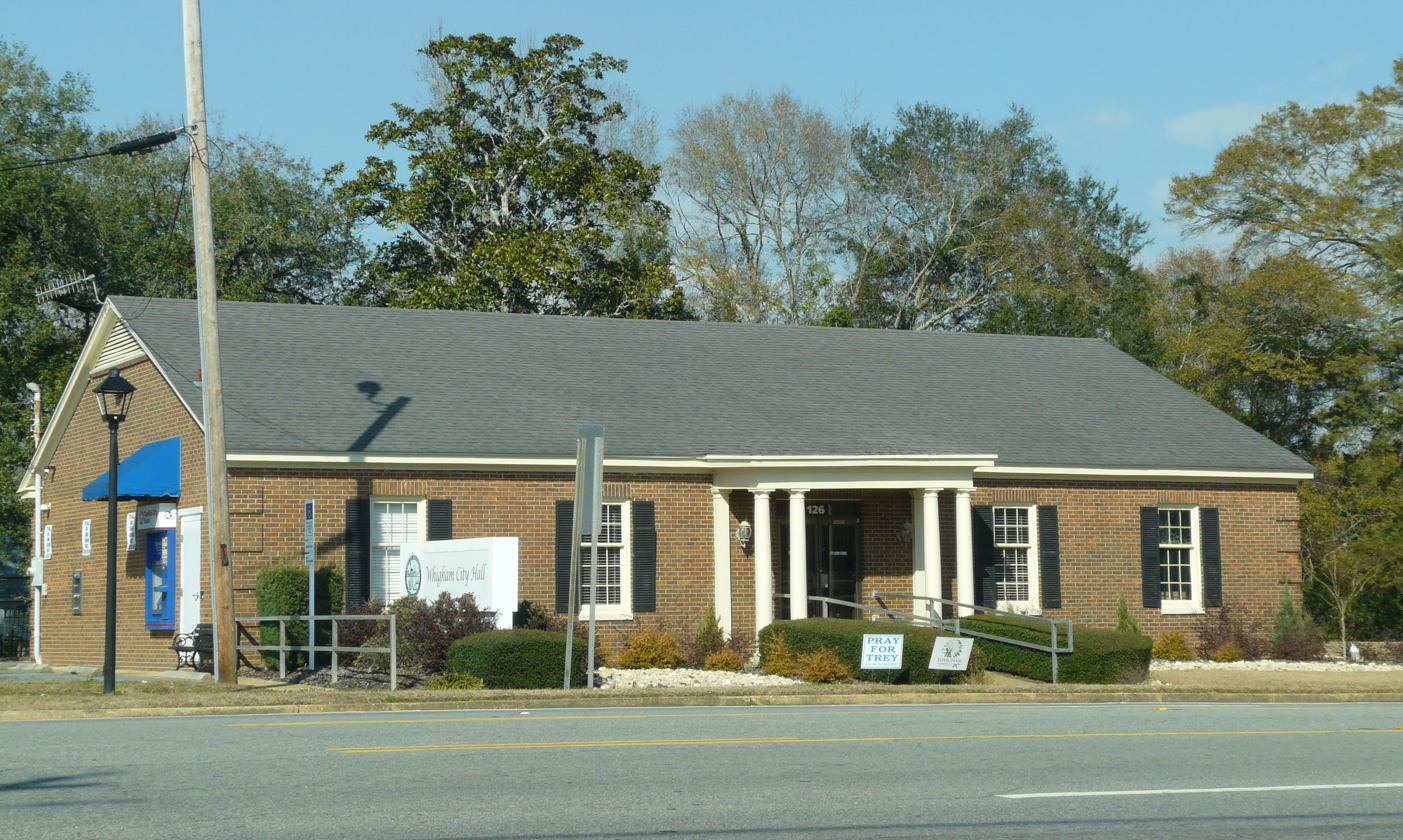
- Whigham City Hall

- Seal

- Location in Grady County and the state of Georgia
- Coordinates: 30°53′3″N 84°19′30″W
- Country: United States
- State: Georgia
- County: Grady

Government
  - Mayor: Trey Gainous

Area
  - Total: 1.19 sq mi (3.07 km^{2})
  - Land: 1.17 sq mi (3.04 km^{2})
  - Water: 0.012 sq mi (0.03 km^{2})
- Elevation: 282 ft (86 m)

Population (2020)
  - Total: 428
  - Density: 364.7/sq mi (140.83/km^{2})
- Time zone: UTC-5 (Eastern (EST))
  - Summer (DST): UTC-4 (EDT)
- ZIP codes: 31797, 39897
- Area code: 229
- FIPS code: 13-82412
- GNIS feature ID: 0333406
- Website: cityofwhigham.net

Whigham is a city in Grady County, Georgia, United States. The population was 428 in 2020.

== History ==
The community was named after Robert Whigham, a local merchant. The Georgia General Assembly incorporated Whigham as a town in 1896. It was incorporated again as a city in 1970.

== Geography ==
Whigham is located in western Grady County at 30°53′3″N 84°19′30″W (30.884219, -84.324927). U.S. Route 84 passes through the center of town as Broad Avenue; it leads east 8 miles (13 km) to Cairo, the county seat, and west 15 miles (24 km) to Bainbridge. Valdosta is 67 miles (108 km) to the east, and Dothan, Alabama, is 70 miles (110 km) to the west. Whigham is located halfway between Memphis, Tennessee, and Miami, Florida.

According to the United States Census Bureau, the city has a total area of 1.2 square miles (3.1 km^{2}), of which 0.01 square miles (0.03 km^{2}), or 0.98%, is water.

== Demographics ==
Historical population
Census	Pop.	Note	%±
1880	144		—
1890	264		83.3%
1900	392		48.5%
1910	627		59.9%
1920	662		5.6%
1930	442		−33.2%
1940	533		20.6%
1950	471		−11.6%
1960	463		−1.7%
1970	381		−17.7%
1980	507		33.1%
1990	605		19.3%
2000	631		4.3%
2010	471		−25.4%
2020	428		−9.1%
U.S. Decennial Census; 1850-1870 1870-1880; 1890-1910 1920-1930; 1940 1950 1960; 1970 1980 1990; 2000 2010

As of the census of 2000, there were 631 people, 179 households, and 134 families residing in the city. In 2020, its population declined to 428.

== Education ==
Grady County School System operates area public schools. Whigham School, a K-12 school, is in Whigham. Cairo High School in Cairo serves Whigham as well.

== Notable people ==
- The electric blues guitarist, songwriter, and singer Johnnie Marshall was born in Whigham in 1961.
- Ernest Riles, former infielder for the San Francisco Giants and Milwaukee Brewers lived here during his time with the Giants.
- The Plath family from the TLC show Welcome to Plathville grew up on a farm in Whigham.
