= Frank Richter (American football) =

American football player (1944–2019)

No. 58
- Position: Linebacker

Personal information
- Born: December 24, 1944; Toccoa, Georgia, U.S.
- Died: December 28, 2019 (aged 75); Albany, Georgia, U.S.
- Listed height: 6 ft 3 in (1.91 m)
- Listed weight: 235 lb (107 kg)

Career information
- High school: Cairo (Cairo, Georgia)
- College: Georgia
- NFL draft: 1967: 7th round, 165th overall pick

Career history
- Denver Broncos (1967–1969); Los Angeles Rams (1970)*; Washington Redskins (1971)*
- * Offseason or practice squad member only
- Stats at Pro Football Reference

Frank Ashton Richter IV (December 24, 1944 – December 28, 2019) was an American professional football linebacker who played for the Denver Broncos of the American Football League (AFL). He played college football for the Georgia Bulldogs and was selected by the Broncos in the seventh round of the 1967 AFL draft.

== Early life ==
Frank Ashton Richter IV was born on December 24, 1944, in Toccoa, Georgia. He played high school football at Cairo High School in Cairo, Georgia. As a senior in 1962, he earned all-state honors at end.

== College career ==
In 1963, Richter enrolled at the University of Georgia to play college football for the Bulldogs. He played on the varsity team during the 1963 season but did not earn a letter. He was the Bulldogs' starting left end from 1964 to 1965, and the starting right end in 1966. Richter caught 23 career passes for 335 yards and one touchdown.

== Professional career ==
Richter was selected by the Denver Broncos in the seventh round, with the 165th overall pick, of the 1967 AFL draft. He signed with the team on March 27, 1967. He was waived on September 5 and placed on the Broncos' taxi squad. Richter was promoted to the active roster on October 6. He played in nine games, starting five, during the 1967 season, posting two interceptions for six yards, 0.5 sacks, and one fumble recovery. He reported to training camp out of shape in 1968 and was involved in a car accident with San Francisco 49ers player Steve Spurrier. They were in the same car. Denver head coach Lou Saban fined Richter $500 for staying out late the night of the wreck. He appeared in 11 games, starting five, in 1968 and recovered one fumble. He played in all 14 games, startin five, during the 1969 season and made 2.0 sacks.

On May 1, 1970, Richter was traded to the Los Angeles Rams for Izzy Lang. Richter was waived by the Rams on August 31, 1970.

In February 1971, Richter was taking classes at Macon Junior College in order to get a real estate license. However, he still wanted an NFL team to sign him. He signed with the Washington Redskins in April 1971. Richter was released on August 7, 1971.

== Personal life ==
Richter started his own real estate company. He sold land in several counties in Georgia. He also became a buyer of pecans in Dothan, Alabama. Richter was inducted into the Grady County Sports Hall of Fame. He died on December 28, 2019, in Albany, Georgia.
