= Ralph Helmick =

American sculptor

- Born: February 8, 1952 (age 74); Pittsburgh, Pennsylvania, United States
- Education: University of Michigan (BA)
- Known for: Sculpture, Public art
- Website: www.helmicksculpture.com

Ralph Helmick (born 8 February 1952) is an American sculptor and public artist.

== Early life and education ==
Helmick was born in Pittsburgh, Pennsylvania, the middle of three sons of an electrical engineer and a homemaker. While in elementary school he partook in the Carnegie Museum’s renowned Tam O’Shanter art classes for children, whose alumni include Andy Warhol, Annie Dillard, Philip Pearlstein, and Jonathan Borofsky. His family later moved to Williamsville, NY, outside Buffalo. Helmick received a BA in American Studies from the University of Michigan. He studied at the Skowhegan School of Painting and Sculpture, and then earned an MFA in sculpture from a joint program at the School of the Museum of Fine Arts, Boston and Tufts University.

As a child then a student, he was very influenced by the science and the design of the Foucault pendulum and Muybridge’s sequential photos.

== Career ==
Helmick has created over 50 complex, layered sculpture commissions, working in various materials (metal, stained glass, cast resin, found objects) to realize large-scale public artworks in courthouses, parks, airports, schools, hospitals, museums, and other civic spaces across the US. His works play on human perception, and often employ anamorphosis, an optical phenomenon where images are resolved from a precise perspective. The dynamic relationship between science and art is a frequent inspiration for his designs.

Helmick's award-winning works include the Arthur Fiedler Memorial on the Charles River Esplanade; the Stevie Ray Vaughan Memorial at Austin's Auditorium Shores; Rabble at the North Carolina Museum of Art; Landing at the Seattle-Tacoma International Airport; Heart and Mind at the Oregon Institute of Technology. In 2019 The Constellation won the prestigious CODAaward for International Institutional Artwork.

He was a 2009 Artist-in-Residence at the McColl Center for Art + Innovation in Charlotte, NC. In 2014, he juried the Public Art Network Year in Review. His own commissions had been awarded the PAN YiR on eight previous occasions.

Helmick Sculpture is based in Newton, Massachusetts.

== Prominent works ==
=== Edifice (2018) ===
Notre Dame Stadium, Notre Dame, IN

The work consists of a reproduction of the campus landmark of the Main Building made up of 4,100 small pewter heads hung on 2,221 cables suspended from the ceiling. The pewter heads, which are silver except for the golden ones making up the dome, were created by scanning the likeness of students, staff and faculty members. The work is meant to symbolize the diversity and cohesion of the community. The scans were conducted in November 2017 and the work installed in October 2018. Edifice hangs on the second floor of the Duncan Student Center, which is part of the Notre Dame stadium.

=== The Constellation (2018) ===
The Founder’s Memorial Park, Abu Dhabi, UAE

The Constellation is a monumental public artwork and the centrepiece of the Founder’s Memorial Park in Abu Dhabi. The memorial commemorates Sheikh Zayed bin Sultan Al Nahyan (1918–2004), the founding president of the United Arab Emirates.

=== n + 1 (2018) ===
Tampa International Airport/ Tampa, Florida A streamlined sculpture of an adult leatherback sea turtle floats beneath a cloud of small hatchlings that articulate the same form at a larger scale. This “double portrait” illustrates biological fact (the multitude of newborns from which a single individual may survive to adulthood) while simultaneously evoking an intergenerational spiritual connection. Nature and Spirit.

=== Field Guide (2017) ===
Polytrauma & Blind Rehabilitation Center/ Veterans Administration Palo Alto Health Care System, Palo Alto, California

A latticework screen outside the entrance to the VA’s Polytrauma & Blind Rehabilitation Center. While seeming to be linear abstraction from a distance, the piece is formed from overlapping local plant and animal forms.

=== Schwerpunkt (2016) ===
The McGovern Institute for Brain Research at MIT/ Cambridge, Massachusetts

One hundred sculptures of neurons are suspended in the entrance of the research institute. Executed in different configurations and a range of sizes, they cascade in a seemingly random array, their gold-leafed surfaces reflecting light throughout the building. When viewed from a single perspective on the balcony, the forms optically cohere into a macroscopic rendering of a human brain.

=== Floating World (2014) ===
Biorenewables Complex, Iowa State University / Ames, Iowa

This three-story suspended sculpture uses eight laser-cut steel panels to depict changing horizons that illustrate the evolution of agriculture from the nineteenth-century to the modern day. These historical panels are interspersed with abstract perforated "mist" layers, and framed above by a "sun" sequence, and below by a succession of terrazzo floor graphics.

It is inspired by the paintings of Grant Wood, and by compositional strategies employed in Japanese woodblock prints (ukiyo-e, literally "floating world").

=== Rara Avis (2001) ===
Midway Airport / Chicago, Illinois

This 28-foot (8.5 m) sculpture of a red cardinal is made of around 1,800 handcrafted small sculptures of aircraft.

Rara Avis was recognized by the Public Art Network Year in Review in 2002.

=== Jurisprudents (2000) ===
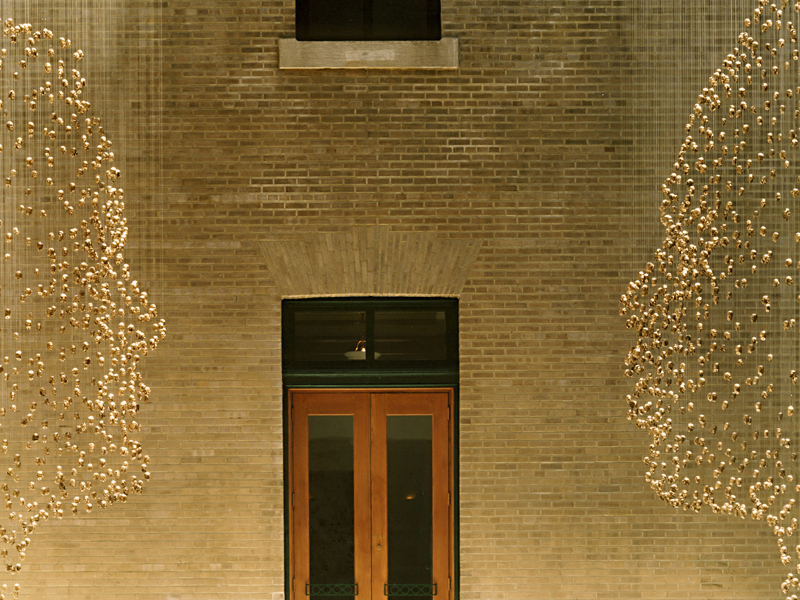
Jurisprudents, East St. Louis (2000)

Melvin Price Federal Courthouse / E. St. Louis, Illinois

This is a sculpture of two 15-foot (4.6 m) tall heads facing each other across a courthouse atrium, each composed of around 1,500 small sculptures.

The design for this commission evolved in the wake of the acquittals of O. J. Simpson and the police who beat Rodney King.

Jurisprudents received the GSA National Design Honor Award for Art in 2000.

=== Pasadena Robinson Memorial (1997) ===
Centennial Square/Pasadena, California

The Pasadena Robinson Memorial commemorates Jackie Robinson and Mack Robinson and their accomplishments in sports and civics.

=== Stevie Ray Vaughan Memorial (1994) ===
Lady Bird Lake / Austin, Texas

Stevie Ray Vaughan Memorial commemorates Vaughan, the blues guitarist. It features a realistic figure of the musician in a meditative pose, with a shadow of the musician playing the guitar. It is installed at Auditorium Shores on Lady Bird Lake, where Vaughan performed many concerts. It is one of the city's most popular tourist attractions, and has been awarded "Best Public Artwork in Austin" by The Austin Chronicle multiple times.

=== Arthur Fiedler Memorial (1984) ===
Charles River Esplanade / Boston, Massachusetts

This is a large-scale sculptural bust of Arthur Fiedler, the late conductor of the Boston Pops Orchestra, formed from stacked aluminum plates.

The sculpture is located on an island across from the Hatch Shell, the site of many concerts conducted by Fiedler. The art critic Sebastian Smee cites it as an example of high quality public art in Boston.

== Collaboration ==
Helmick and artist-engineer Stuart Schechter (1958- ) collaborated on a number of projects, working as Helmick & Schechter from 1993 to 2008.
