= Grady County Courthouse =

Grady County Courthouse may refer to:

- Grady County Courthouse (Georgia), Cairo, Georgia
- Grady County Courthouse (Oklahoma), Chickasha, Oklahoma, listed on the National Register of Historic Places
