= Grady County Schools =

School district in Georgia (U.S. state)

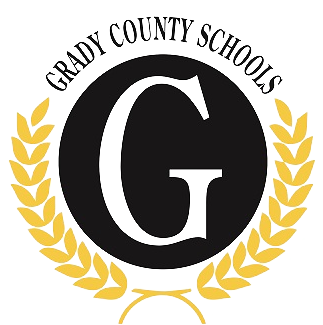

Address
- 985 1st Street NW Cairo, Georgia, 39828-2105; United States
- Coordinates: 30.888057°N 84.208219°W

District information
- Grades: Pre-kindergarten – 12
- Accreditations: Southern Association of Colleges and Schools; Georgia Accrediting Commission

Students and staff
- Enrollment: 4,405 (2022–23)
- Faculty: 326.20 (FTE)
- Staff: 312.00 (FTE)
- Student–teacher ratio: 13.50

Other information
- Telephone: (229) 377-3701
- Fax: (229) 377-3437
- Website: grady.k12.ga.us

The Grady County Schools District is a school district headquartered in Cairo, Georgia, United States. The district serves Grady County.

== Schools ==
=== Secondary schools ===
- Cairo High School (Cairo)
- Washington Middle School (Cairo)

=== K-8 schools ===
- Shiver Elementary School (unincorporated area)
- Whigham Elementary School (Whigham)

=== Primary schools ===
- Eastside Elementary School (Cairo)
- Northside Elementary School (Cairo) - (Closed end of 2023–2024 school year) - Current School Board location December 2024
- Southside Elementary School (Cairo)
