= Grady County Courthouse (Georgia) =

Government building in Cairo, Georgia, USA

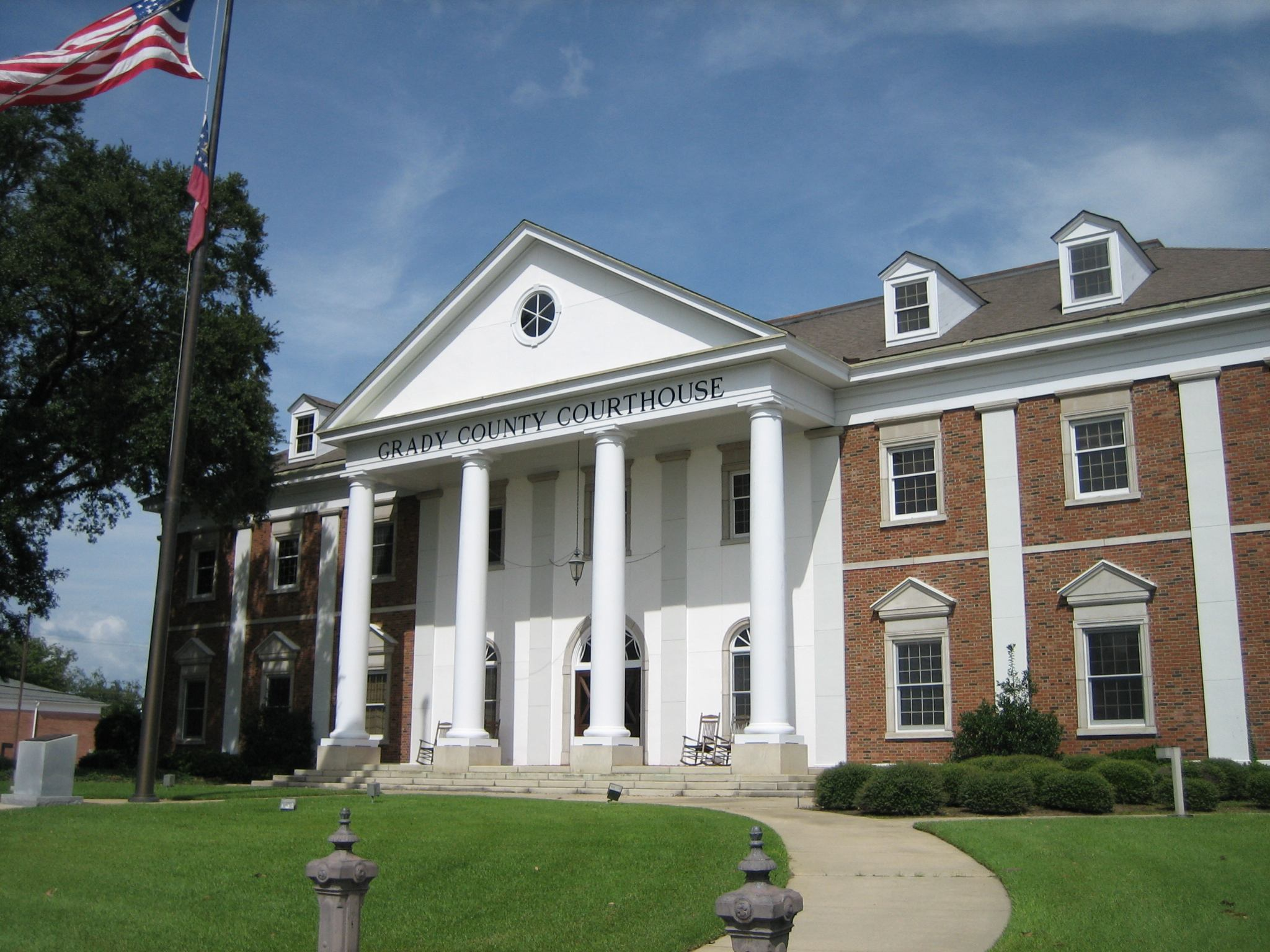
Grady County Courthouse, 2008

The Grady County Courthouse is a courthouse in Cairo, Grady County, Georgia. It was constructed in 1985 after the previous courthouse burned down in 1980. The building was designed by Jinright, Ryan and Lynn Architects in the Classical Revival architectural style.
