= Arthur Fiedler Memorial =

Sculpture in Boston, Massachusetts, U.S.

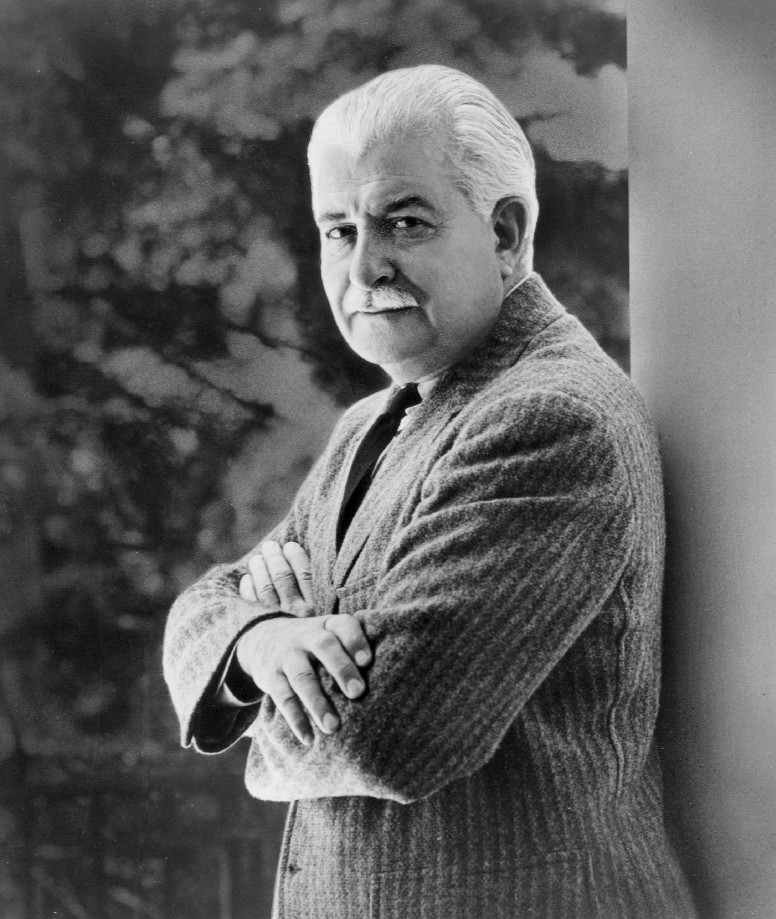
- Arthur Fiedler, whom the memorial honors, in 1968.
- Artist: Ralph Helmick
- Year: 1984
- Medium: Aluminum sculpture
- Subject: Arthur Fiedler
- Location: Boston, Massachusetts, U.S.; 42.356502°N 71.075446°W

The Arthur Fiedler Memorial by Ralph Helmick is installed along the Charles River Esplanade, in Boston, Massachusetts, United States.

== Description and history ==
The monumental head of Arthur Fiedler, a long-time conductor of the Boston Pops Orchestra, was completed in 1984, and dedicated on June 30 of that year. The aluminum sculpture is made of 83 plates and stands approximately 6.5 ft. tall. It rests on a granite base that is approximately 18 in tall. The work cost $150,000. It was surveyed as part of the Smithsonian Institution's "Save Outdoor Sculpture!" program in 1997. The Arthur Fiedler Memorial was fabricated by Lippincott, North Haven, CT.
