= Bobby Walden =

American football player (1938–2018)

No. 39
- Positions: Running back, Punter

Personal information
- Born: March 9, 1938; Boston, Georgia, U.S.
- Died: August 27, 2018 (aged 80); Bainbridge, Georgia, U.S.
- Listed height: 6 ft 0 in (1.83 m)
- Listed weight: 192 lb (87 kg)

Career information
- High school: Cairo (Cairo, Georgia)
- College: Georgia

Career history
- 1961–1963: Edmonton Eskimos
- 1963: Hamilton Tiger-Cats
- 1964–1967: Minnesota Vikings
- 1968–1977: Pittsburgh Steelers

Awards and highlights
- 2× Super Bowl champion (IX, X); Pro Bowl (1969); Pittsburgh Steelers All-Time Team; Second-team All-SEC (1959)
- Stats at Pro Football Reference

Robert Earl Walden (March 9, 1938 – August 27, 2018) was an American professional football player who was a punter in the National Football League (NFL) and Canadian Football League (CFL). Walden played for 17 seasons, 14 of which were played in the NFL from 1964 to 1977. Previously, Walden had played three years in the CFL from 1961 to 1963. Walden was a part of the Pittsburgh Steelers' Super Bowl IX and Super Bowl X winning teams.

He led the NFL in punting in 1964 with a 46.4 yard average and was selected to the Pro Bowl after the 1969 season.

Before his NFL career, Walden led the CFL in punting, rushing, and receiving as a member of the Edmonton Eskimos in 1961 and 1962.

Walden played for the University of Georgia Bulldogs for three years from 1958 to 1960. In 1958, as a sophomore, he led the nation in average yards per punt. In 1960, he set an Orange Bowl record for yards per punt.
