= David Ponder =

American football player (born 1962)

No. 97
- Position: Defensive tackle

Personal information
- Born: June 27, 1962 (age 64); Washington, North Carolina
- Listed height: 6 ft 3 in (1.91 m)
- Listed weight: 248 lb (112 kg)

Career information
- High school: Cairo (Cairo, Georgia)
- College: Florida State
- NFL draft: 1984: undrafted

Career history
- Dallas Cowboys (1985); Los Angeles Raiders (1985); Buffalo Bills (1986)*; Calgary Stampeders (1986)
- * Offseason or practice squad member only

Career NFL statistics
- Games played: 4
- Stats at Pro Football Reference

David Earl Ponder (born June 27, 1962) is an American former professional football player who was a defensive tackle in the National Football League (NFL) for the Dallas Cowboys. He played college football for the Florida State Seminoles.

== Early life ==
Ponder attended Cairo High School in Cairo, Georgia. He received All-state honors as a senior. He accepted a football scholarship from Florida State University where he was a two-year starter at nose guard and defensive tackle for the Seminoles.

As a junior in 1982, he was moved from defensive tackle to nose guard to replace an injured Lennie Chavers. As a senior in 1983, he was moved back to defensive tackle and registered 5 sacks (second on the team).

== Professional career ==
=== Dallas Cowboys ===
Ponder was signed as an undrafted free agent by the Dallas Cowboys after the 1984 NFL draft. He played defensive tackle and was waived on August 27, 1984.

In 1985, Ponder was re-signed and appeared in four games. On October 26, he was released to make room to activate defensive tackle Don Smerek.

=== Los Angeles Raiders ===
On November 21, 1985, he was signed by the Los Angeles Raiders. He was released two days later on November 23.

=== Buffalo Bills ===
On May 6, 1986, he signed as a free agent with the Buffalo Bills to play nose guard. He was cut on August 17.

=== Calgary Stampeders ===
In 1986, he signed with the Calgary Stampeders of the Canadian Football League. He was released on October 19.

== Personal life ==
His son Christian played quarterback for the Florida State Seminoles while in college and the Minnesota Vikings in the National Football League.
