= Johanna Fiedler =

American writer on music (1945–2011)

Johanna Fiedler (September 17, 1945 – May 27, 2011) was an American writer on music and publicist. Born in Boston, Massachusetts, Fiedler was the daughter of Boston Pops conductor Arthur Fiedler. In 1994 she published a memoir of her father, Arthur Fiedler: Papa, the Pops and Me. She was educated at Sarah Lawrence College (graduated 1967). She began her career working for the National Symphony Orchestra as their public relations director. She left that post to become editor of concert programs for the New York Philharmonic. She then became chief press liaison for the Metropolitan Opera, a position she held from 1975 to 1989. She later published a book about the Met, Molto Agitato: The Mayhem Behind the Music, in 2001. She died in Manhattan in 2011 at the age of 65.
