= J. J. Wilcox =

American football player (born 1991)

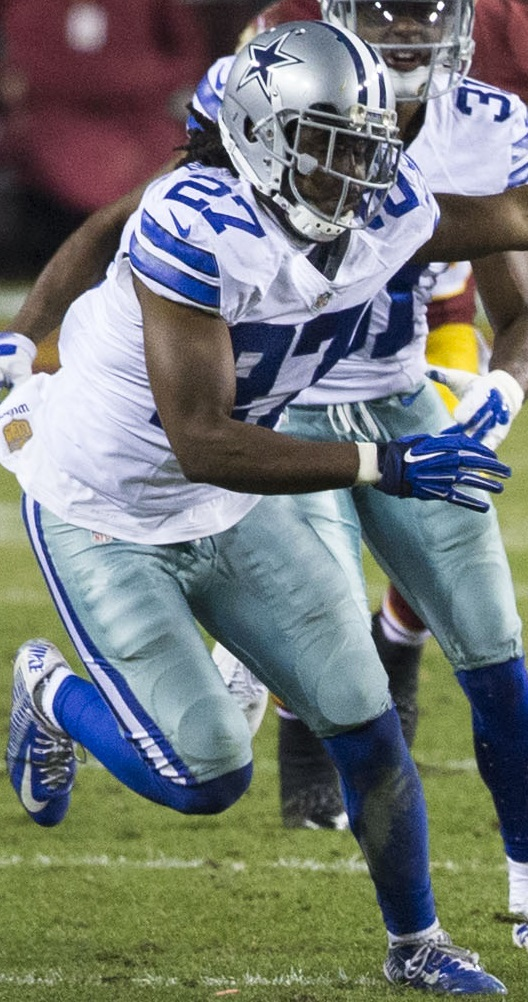
- Wilcox with the Dallas Cowboys in 2015

No. 27, 37
- Position: Safety

Personal information
- Born: February 14, 1991 (age 35); Cairo, Georgia, U.S.
- Listed height: 6 ft 0 in (1.83 m)
- Listed weight: 212 lb (96 kg)

Career information
- High school: Cairo
- College: Georgia Southern (2009–2012)
- NFL draft: 2013: 3rd round, 80th overall pick

Career history
- Dallas Cowboys (2013–2016); Tampa Bay Buccaneers (2017)*; Pittsburgh Steelers (2017); New York Jets (2018); Indianapolis Colts (2018); Atlanta Falcons (2019–2020)
- * Offseason or practice squad member only

Awards and highlights
- First-team All-Southern (2012)

Career NFL statistics
- Total tackles: 233
- Forced fumbles: 2
- Fumble recoveries: 3
- Pass deflections: 16
- Interceptions: 6
- Stats at Pro Football Reference

James Edward "J. J." Wilcox, Jr. (born February 14, 1991) is an American former professional football player who was a safety in the National Football League (NFL). He was selected by the Dallas Cowboys in the third round of the 2013 NFL draft. He played college football for the Georgia Southern Eagles. He was also a member of the Tampa Bay Buccaneers, Pittsburgh Steelers, New York Jets, Indianapolis Colts, and Atlanta Falcons.

== Early life ==
Wilcox was born in Cairo, Georgia. He attended Cairo High School, where he played wide receiver and free safety. As a senior, he registered 22 receptions for 400 yards, 5 touchdowns, 77 tackles, one interception and 3 forced fumbles, while helping the Cairo Syrupmakers win the 2008 state championship. He received first-team All-region and first-team All-area honors at wide receiver.

== College career ==
Coming out of high school, Wilcox was not a highly sought after prospect and planned onto walking onto Georgia Southern's football team after not receiving a scholarship offer. Georgia Southern only offered a scholarship after Samford had extended a scholarship offer to Wilcox a week before national signing day. Wilcox attended Georgia Southern University, where he played for the Georgia Southern Eagles football team from 2009 to 2012. He started off his career as a wide receiver, tallying 16 receptions for 179 yards and 3 tackles on defense.

As a sophomore, he was moved to running back. He started 14 out of 15 games, registering 85 carries for 484 yards (5.7-yard average), 6 rushing touchdowns, 22 receptions (led the team) for 551 yards, 25.02-yard average per reception (school record), 3 receiving touchdowns and 2 tackles on defense. Against the University of Tennessee at Chattanooga, he had 121 receiving yards, including a 63-yard catch. Against Furman University, he had 107 receiving yards.

As a junior, he started 8 out of 13 games, posting 52 carries for 480 yards (9.2-yard average), 7 rushing touchdowns, 7 receptions for 168 yards and one receiving touchdown. Against Western Carolina University, he had 115 rushing yards and 2 touchdowns. Against the University of Maine, he collected 99 rushing yards and 2 touchdowns.

As a senior, he was moved safety. He started 13 out of 14 games, finishing second on the team with 88 tackles, two interceptions, three pass breakups and one blocked punt. He also returned 31 kicks for 780 yards and averaged 25.2 yards per kickoff return. Against Samford University, he had 12 tackles.

== Professional career ==
=== Pre-draft ===
On December 4, 2012, it was reported that Wilcox had accepted his invitation to play in the 2013 Senior Bowl. He became the second player from Georgia Southern to appear in the Senior Bowl, the first being Adrian Peterson in 2002. Under Detroit Lions' head coach Jim Schwartz, he had impressive performances in practice during the week leading up to the Senior Bowl. On January 26, 2013, Wilcox recorded two combined tackles to help the South defeat the North 21–16.

As a top safety prospect, Wilcox received an invitation to the NFL Combine and completed all of the required combine drills and positional drills. Amongst all safeties, Wilcox finished sixth in the short shuttle, eighth in the 40-yard dash, and ninth in the broad jump. On March 15, 2013, he participated at Georgia Southern's pro day. Satisfied with his performance at the NFL combine, he chose to only perform positional drills. Team representatives and scouts from 22 NFL teams attended Georgia Southern's pro day. At the conclusion of the pre-draft process, Wilcox was projected to be a third round pick by the majority of NFL analysts and scouts. Wilcox was ranked the third best strong safety prospect available in the draft by NFLDraftScout.com, the fifth best safety by NFL analyst Josh Norris, and the sixth best safety by NFL analyst Mike Mayock.

Pre-draft measurables
Height	Weight	Arm length	Hand span	40-yard dash	10-yard split	20-yard split	20-yard shuttle	Three-cone drill	Vertical jump	Broad jump	Bench press
6 ft 0 in (1.83 m)	213 lb (97 kg)	31 in (0.79 m)	9 in (0.23 m)	4.57 s	1.57 s	2.65 s	4.09 s	7.02 s	35 in (0.89 m)	10 ft 4 in (3.15 m)	17 reps
All values from NFL Combine

=== Dallas Cowboys ===
==== 2013 ====
The Dallas Cowboys selected Wilcox in the third round (80th overall) of the 2013 NFL draft. He was the seventh safety selected in 2013.

On June 18, 2013, the Cowboys signed Wilcox to a four-year, $2.81 million contract.

He competed with Will Allen, Jeff Heath, Matt Johnson, and Brandon Underwood for the job as the starting free safety left by the departure Gerald Sensabaugh. The Dallas Cowboys were going to name him starting free safety during training camp, but the unexpected death of his mother slowed his progress due to a two-week absence. Head coach Jason Garrett decided to name veteran Will Allen the starter instead to start the regular season instead.

He made his professional regular season debut in the Dallas Cowboys' season-opener against the New York Giants and assisted on one tackle during their 36–31 win. On September 22, 2013, Wilcox earned his first career start at free safety and recorded three combined tackles in the Cowboys' 31–7 victory over the St. Louis Rams. During a Week 5 matchup against the Denver Broncos, Wilcox made a season-high eight combined tackles in a 51–48 loss. He started five consecutive games, until suffering a sprained right knee in practice, that forced him to miss three games (Weeks 8-10). The injury occurred during red zone drills as he was defending a pass against tight end Gavin Escobar During his absence, he was replaced by rookie undrafted free agent Jeff Heath. On November 24, 2013, Wilcox returned from his knee sprain and recorded four combined tackles in a 24–21 loss at the New York Giants. He left the game in the first quarter and was placed into the concussion protocol. He finished the year in a reserve role at free safety and had a total of 38 combined tackles (22 solo) and a pass deflection in 13 games and five starts.

==== 2014 ====
Wilcox competed with Jeff Heath and Ahmad Dixon in training camp for the starting free safety position. New defensive coordinator Rod Marinelli chose to move Heath and Wilcox to the strong safety role and veteran Barry Church to free safety. He was named the starting strong safety by head coach Jason Garrett.

On October 27, 2014, Wilcox collected seven solo tackles and made his first career interception off a pass attempt by Washington Redskins' quarterback Colt McCoy during a 20–17 overtime loss. In Week 13, he recorded a season-high ten combined tackles in the Cowboys' 33–10 loss to the Philadelphia Eagles. On December 14, 2014, Wilcox made four solo tackles, forced a fumble, and (sacked?) Eagles' quarterback Mark Sanchez in their 38–27 victory. The following week, he made one solo tackle, deflected a pass, and intercepted a pass attempt by Andrew Luck as Dallas routed the Indianapolis Colts 42–7. The Dallas Cowboys finished the 2014 season atop the NFC East with a 12–4 record. On January 4, 2015, Wilcox started his first career playoff game and recorded seven solo tackles in a 24-20 NFC Wildcard championship victory over the Detroit Lions. He also started the Cowboys' NFC divisional playoff game against the Green Bay Packers, but did not record a stat in their 26–21 loss. There was major controversy surrounding the ending of the game after Dez Bryant's 31-yard catch on a fourth and two was overturned after a challenge by Packers' head coach Mike McCarthy. Referee Gene Steratore stated that Bryant did not maintain possession of the ball throughout the entirety of the catch.

He started 16 games and was fourth on the team with 74 combined tackles (62 solo), three interceptions, four pass deflections, one forced and two fumble recoveries. He played in 94.4% of the Dallas Cowboys defensive snaps in 2014.

==== 2015 ====
In training camp, Wilcox competed with Jeff Heath for the starting free safety position with Barry Church at strong safety. He won the job and was named the starter going into the regular season.

Wilcox started the Dallas Cowboys' season-opener against The New York Giants and recorded three combined tackles and defended a pass in their 27–26 victory. During the first quarter, Wilcox delivered a vicious hit against Giants' wide receiver Odell Beckham Jr. and successfully broke up a pass attempt by Eli Manning. Unfortunately, Wilcox suffered a broken nose on the play, but continued to play the remainder of the game while Beckham briefly left the game. The following week, the Cowboys matched up at the Philadelphia Eagles and Wilcox made a solo tackle and intercepted a pass attempt by Sam Bradford, as the Cowboys defeated them 20-10

On November 8, 2015, Wilcox collected seven combined tackles in a 33–27 overtime loss to the Philadelphia Eagles. Wilcox suffered heavy criticism for a poor play that resulted in the Eagles winning in overtime. Philadelphia Eagles' quarterback Sam Bradford completed a pass to Jordan Matthews who scored a 41-yard touchdown after Byron Jones stumbled and Wilcox took a poor angle while in pursuit. The following week, Wilcox was demoted to be the backup safety behind rookie Byron Jones, but returned as the starting free safety in Week 11 after Jones had to substitute for Morris Claiborne at cornerback after suffering a hamstring injury. On November 13, 2015, he earned a season-high ten combined tackles in a 28–7 loss to the Green Bay Packers. During a Week 17 matchup against the Washington Redskins, Wilcox recorded two solo tackles and had the first safety of his career in the Cowboys' 34–23 loss. Wilcox recorded the safety, along with DeMarcus Lawrence in the fourth quarter, stopping Redskin' running back Alfred Morris in the endzone. He recorded 53 combined tackles (37 solo), three pass deflections, an interception, and a forced fumble in 13 starts and 16 games. He also played 821 defensive snaps and in 77.7% of the Cowboys' defensive plays.

During the 2015, Wilcox began developing an identity for delivering hard hits, but also missing tackles. Pro Football Focus ranked him 47th of 63 safeties in tackle efficiency. He also missed 2.6% of his tackles while in deep coverage and was ranked the 79th best overall safety, out of 89 who qualified, for the season.

==== 2016 ====
Wilcox entered training camp on the roster bubble after losing his starting free safety job to Byron Jones after a difficult 2015 season. The Dallas Cowboys also drafted a safety in Kavon Frazier and had an upcoming and competent backup in Jeff Heath. Head coach Jason Garrett named Wilcox the backup strong safety to Barry Church to start the 2016 season.

Due to the proven performance escalated that was placed in the 2011 Collective Bargaining Agreement, Wilcox base salary for 2016 was raised from $690,000 to $1.68 million. This was due to him playing in 45.2% of the defensive snaps in his first three seasons, above the required 35%.

In Week 9, Wilcox returned to the starting lineup at the Cleveland Browns after Barry Church fractured his arm the game prior against the Philadelphia Eagles. He recorded three combined tackles in Dallas' 35–10 victory. On November 13, 2016, Wilcox earned a season-high nine combined tackles and deflected a pass in a 35–30 win against the Pittsburgh Steelers. During a Week 12 contest against the Washington Redskins, Wilcox recorded four solo tackles, but left the Cowboys' 31–26 victory after suffering a thigh contusion. The injury caused him to miss the next three games (Weeks 13–15). Wilcox returned in Week 16 and made three combined tackles, defended two passes, and intercepted a pass attempt by Matthew Stafford during the Dallas Cowboys 42–21 defeat of the Detroit Lions. He finished the 2016 season with 49 combined tackles (37 solo), six pass deflections, and one interception in 13 games and four starts. Although Wilcox played a smaller role in the 2016 season, he was able to improve his play and his pass coverage ability.

=== Tampa Bay Buccaneers ===
On March 11, 2017, the Tampa Bay Buccaneers signed Wilcox to a two-year, $6.25 million contract with $3.12 million guaranteed. Throughout training camp, Wilcox competed with Chris Conte, Keith Tandy, and Justin Evans for a job as one of the starting safeties, but struggled and was projected as a reserve player.

=== Pittsburgh Steelers ===
On September 3, 2017, the Pittsburgh Steelers acquired Wilcox in a trade with the Tampa Bay Buccaneers to improve their depth at safety, following injuries to Jordan Dangerfield and Mike Mitchell. The Pittsburgh Steelers traded their sixth-round pick in the 2018 NFL draft (Jack Cichy) for Wilcox and a seventh-round pick in the 2019 NFL draft Wilcox became expendable after the Buccaneers signed coveted free agent T. J. Ward, who had been released by the Denver Broncos the day prior in a cost-cutting measure.

On September 7, it was reported that he agreed to restructure his contract he initially signed with the Buccaneers. The terms of his new contract are for two-years, $5.5 million deal with a $1.35 million signing bonus. This was done in order to open up more cap space for the 2017 season. Wilcox had $1.35 million of his base salary converted into a signing bonus and prorated it with the length of the contract.

He was named the backup free safety to Mike Mitchell to begin the regular season. Wilcox made his Pittsburgh Steelers' debut in their season-opening 21–18 victory over the Cleveland Browns and finished with two combined tackles. He delivered a helmet-to-helmet hit on Browns' wide receiver Corey Coleman in the fourth quarter and was knocked unconscious in the process. The Pittsburgh Steelers received a 15-yard unnecessary roughness penalty and Wilcox was fined $24,309 by the NFL days later. He missed the following week after being diagnosed with a concussion. On September 24, he collected five combined tackles and intercepted Mike Glennon for his first pick with the Steelers, as they lost 17–23 to the Chicago Bears. The following week, he made his first start as a member of the Steelers and finished with three solo tackles during a 26–9 victory over the Baltimore Ravens. He appeared in 12 games (one start), making 12 tackles, one interception and one pass defensed.

On April 30, 2018, Wilcox was released by the Steelers, after drafting two safeties in the 2018 NFL draft and signing two safeties in free agency.

=== New York Jets ===
On June 6, 2018, Wilcox signed with the New York Jets. He was released by the team on October, 8 to make room for Rashard Robinson.

=== Indianapolis Colts ===
On December 18, 2018, Wilcox was signed by the Indianapolis Colts.

=== Atlanta Falcons ===
On April 22, 2019, Wilcox signed with the Atlanta Falcons. On July 22, he suffered a torn ACL in practice and was ruled out for the season.

On August 9, 2020, Wilcox re-signed with the Falcons. He was released by Atlanta on September 5. Wilcox was re-signed to the team's practice squad on October 8. He was released again on October 20.

== Personal life ==
Wilcox was raised by his parents, James Wilcox Sr. and Marshell Wilcox, in Cairo, Georgia. His mother suffered from lupus and did oxygen therapy due to scarring on her lungs. Due to her conditioning worsening, she had been using an oxygen machine full-time since 2010. Marshell also suffered from lung sarcoidosis. During the 2013 NFL Draft, she was in the hospital with pneumonia. On August 13, 2013, his mother died. His father previously played running back for Fort Valley State and had an invitation to attend training camp with the Miami Dolphins.
