= Pasadena Robinson Memorial =

- Interactive map of Pasadena Robinson Memorial
- Location: 95 Garfield Ave, Pasadena, CA
- Coordinates: 34°8′50.4″N 118°8′40.7″W
- Designer: Ralph Helmick, John Outterbridge, and Stuart Schechter
- Material: Bronze
- Dedicated date: Nov. 6, 1997
- Dedicated to: Jackie and Mack Robinson

The Pasadena Robinson Memorial is a memorial dedicated to Jackie Robinson and Mack Robinson, located in Pasadena, California.

== Background ==
The Pasadena Robinson Memorial consists of two bronze busts, of Jackie and Mack Robinson. Jackie’s face is positioned so he looks east, toward New York City and his eventual career with the Brooklyn Dodgers, while Mack faces Pasadena City Hall because he settled in Pasadena and worked for the city. Created by artists Ralph Helmick, John Outterbridge, and Stuart Schechter, the memorial was funded by the Robinson Memorial Foundation with support from members of the Robinson family and the City of Pasadena.

== Design ==
Each bust is 9 feet (2.7 m) high, 6 feet (1.8 m) wide, 2,700 pounds (1,200 kg), and detailed with bas reliefs of the athletes and their accomplishments.

== Gallery ==
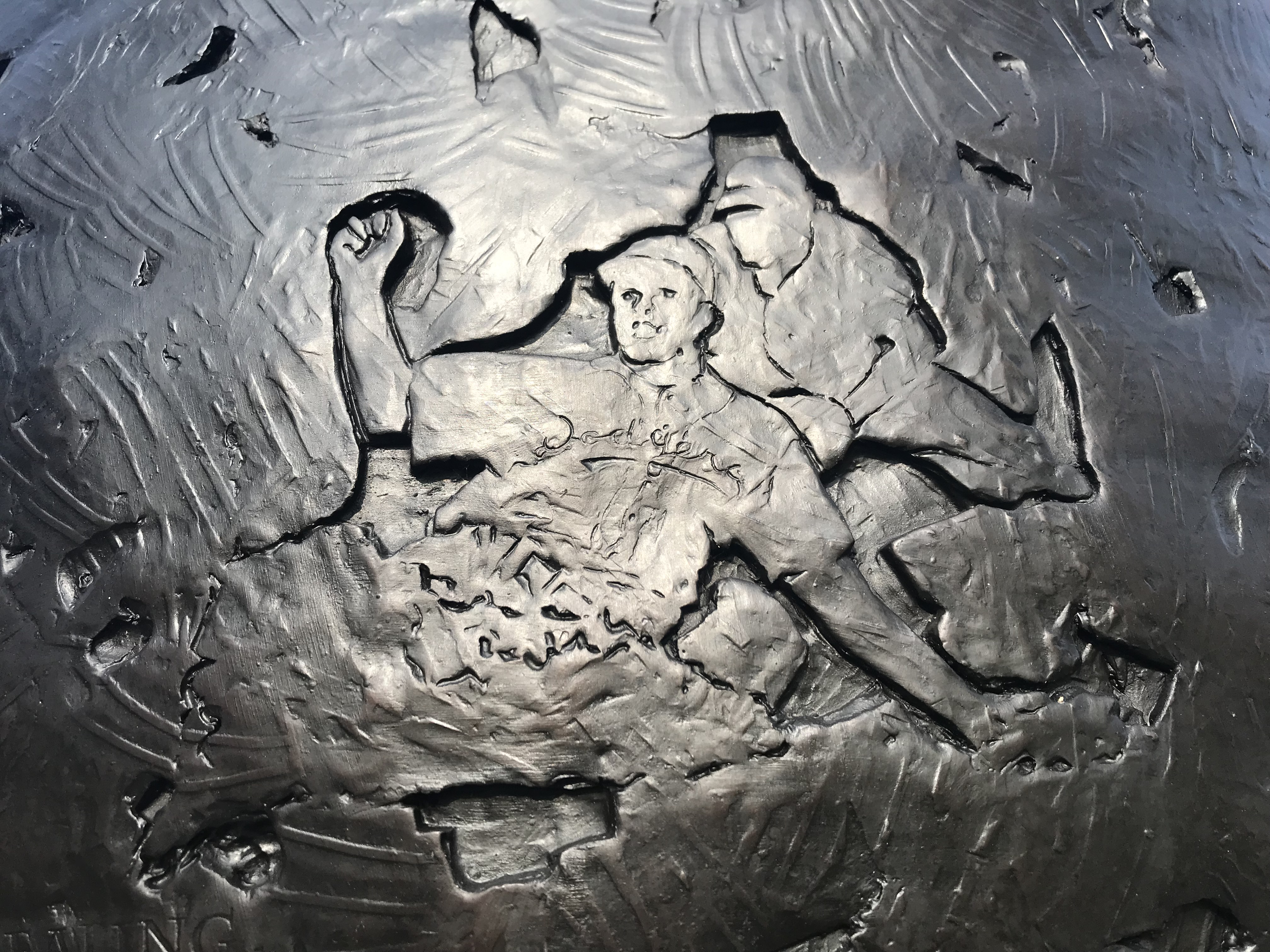
Example of bas reliefs in the sculptures.

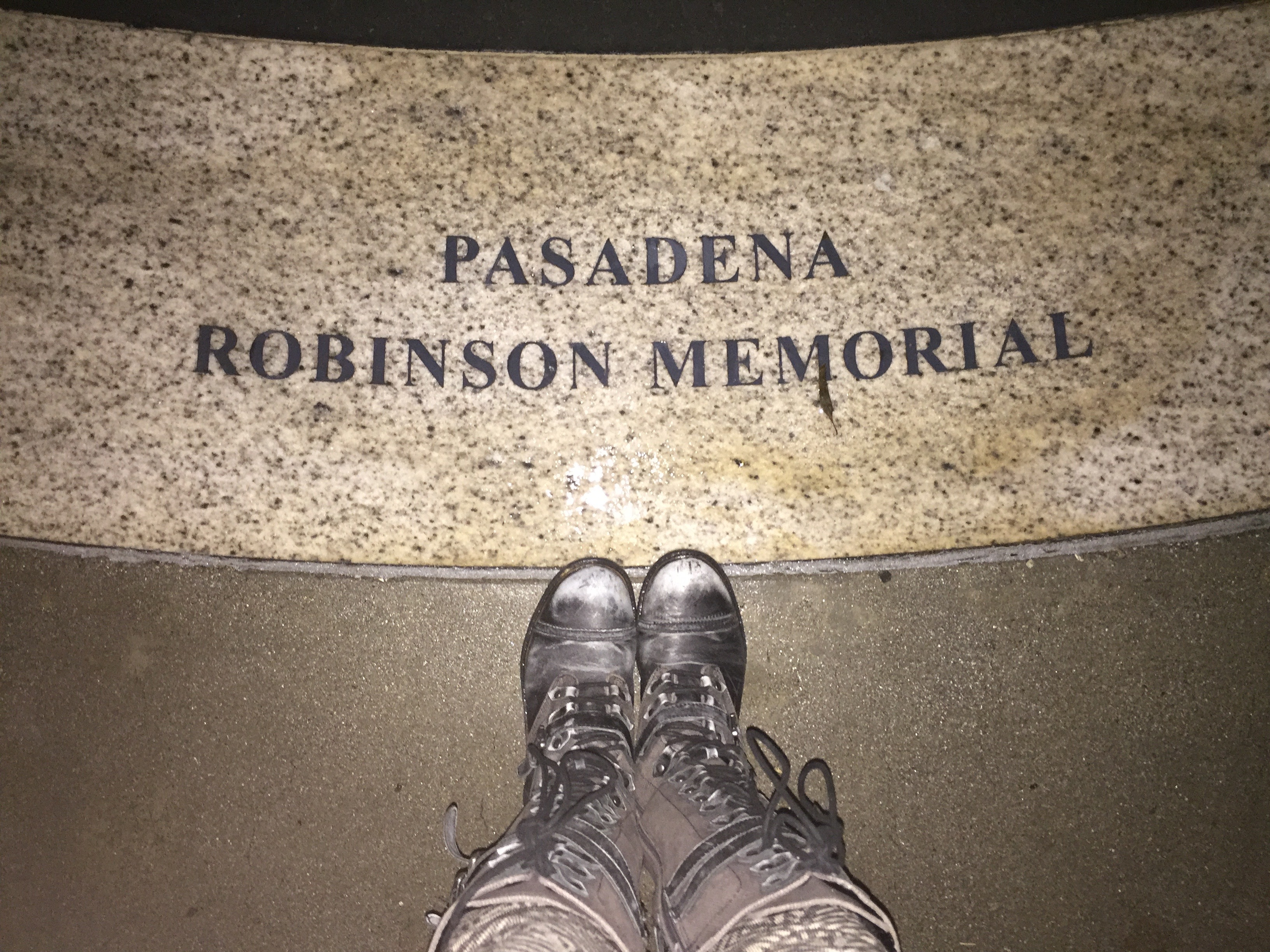
Pasadena Robinson Memorial.
