= Johnnie Marshall =

American musician (born 1961)

- Born: Johnnie B. Marshall Jr. June 2, 1961 (age 65); Whigham, Georgia, United States
- Genre: Electric blues
- Occupations: Guitarist, songwriter, singer
- Instruments: Guitar, vocals
- Years active: 1990s–present
- Label: JSP Records

Johnnie B. Marshall Jr. (born June 2, 1961) is an American electric blues guitarist, songwriter, and singer. His best known songs are "Found Another Woman" and "98 Cents in the Bank". Discovered by Johnny Rawls in the mid 1990s, Marshall has released three albums and continues as a live performer to the present day.

== Life and career ==
Marshall was born in Whigham, Grady County, Georgia, United States. He sang in a gospel choir as a child, and later learned to play the drums to back another gospel group. Marshall soon became more interested in the electric guitar, and had lessons to assist him in playing the instrument. He became proficient enough to form his first band, the Blues Ignitors. However, he needed to find full-time employment working in a meat packing factory, to support his own growing family. In his spare time, Marshall regularly attended his local juke joint, Dave's CC Club, in Tallahassee, Florida, where he studied the musicians who performed there. In addition, Marshall performed there himself and one night was spotted by another musician on the bill, Johnny Rawls. In the late 1990s, Rawls helped to develop Marshall's burgeoning career. This led to Rawls playing rhythm guitar, supplying some vocals and producing Marshall's debut album.

Live for Today was released by JSP Records in 1998. The album was well received, with AllMusic noting that "As debuts go, this is more impressive than most." Special guests on the recording included Eddie Kirkland, Sonny Rhodes, Slam Allen, and George Boone. The album contained eleven tracks, all of them original songs, and Marshall either wrote, or co-penned, eight sides. These included "Dave's C.C. Groove", written as a homage to his humble beginnings in his old club. Marshall went on tour to support the album's release, performing across the United States and with a few dates in Europe.

On his follow-up release the next year, With All My Might, Marshall included a cover of the Bruce Feiner penned song "Brother Dave C.", with thanks specifically to his former club's owner.

By 2000, Marshall and his live band performed a repertoire that had a number of blues standards that included "Five Long Years," "Hoochie Coochie Man," "Call It Stormy Monday (But Tuesday Is Just as Bad)" and "Don't Start Me Talkin'." Marshall's third album, 98 Cents in the Bank (2001), was also issued by JSP Records, and included one of his best known songs as the title track.

In 2009, Marshall worked alongside Sam Lay.

The Johnnie Marshall Blues Band performed on July 4, 2015, at the Bradfordville Blues Club, Tallahassee, Florida, and were scheduled to appear there again on New Year's Eve in 2017. The Johnnie Marshall Blues Band also appeared in September 2016, at the inaugural Florida Jazz & Blues Festival in Cascades Park (Tallahassee).

== Family life ==
Marshall is married and has three children.

== Confusion ==
He is not to be confused with the similarly named contemporary R&B singer, who released the album, When the Smoke Clears (2010).

== Discography ==
Year	Title	Record label
1998	Live for Today	JSP Records
1999	With All My Might	JSP Records
2001	98 Cents in the Bank	JSP Records

== See also ==
- List of electric blues musicians
