= Arthur Fiedler Footbridge =

Footbridge in Boston, Massachusetts, U.S.

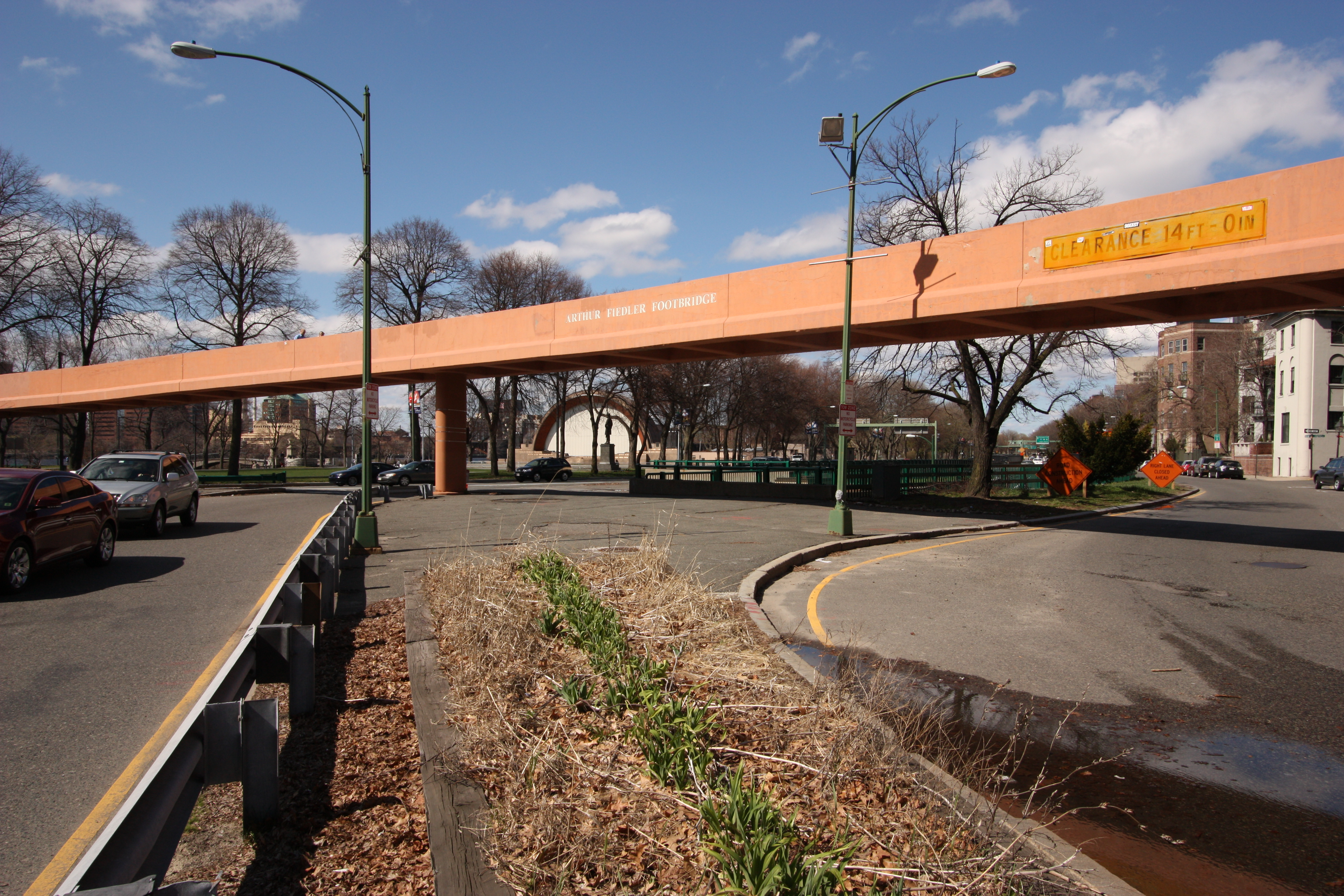
- The bridge in 2011
- Coordinates: 42°21′22″N 71°4′24″W
- Locale: Boston, Massachusetts, U.S.
- Named for: Arthur Fiedler

Location
- Interactive map of Arthur Fiedler Footbridge

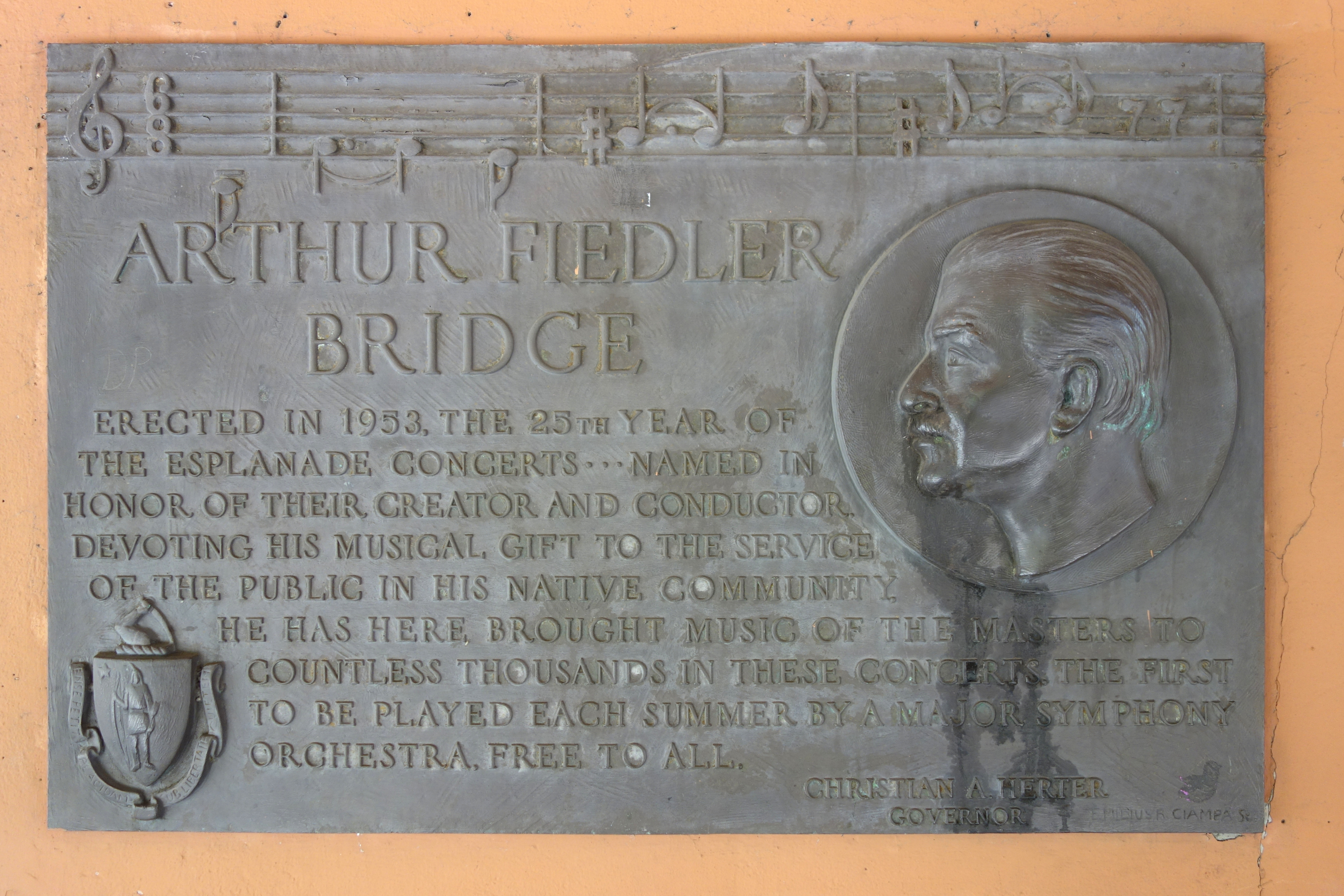
Plaque in 2014

The Arthur Fiedler Footbridge is a wheelchair accessible footbridge named after Arthur Fiedler. It crosses Storrow Drive in the Beacon Hill and Back Bay neighborhoods of Boston, Massachusetts, United States.

The bridge was built in 1953, in brutalist style, and dedicated in 1954 to honor 25 years of concerts by the Boston Pops Orchestra at the Esplanade. It was renovated in 2021.
