= Downtown Getdown =

The City of Tallahassee's Downtown Getdown is a seasonal festival in fall that happens in the central business district in the City of Tallahassee, Florida. The festival involves concerts, stands for food, dancing, street entertainers, make up artist, clowns, grilling, and fun for everyone. The city attracts people from all over the area, including Gadsden County, Wakulla County, Jefferson County, Jackson County, Gulf County, Liberty County, Madison County, Taylor County, and even south Georgia counties, including Thomas and Grady counties.

The festival attracts tens of thousands of people every year and directly benefits United Way of the Big Bend.

The GetDowns are supported by title sponsor Capital City Bank and supporting sponsors, Bud Light along with Tri-Eagle Sales, Aarons, Inc, Tallahassee Democrat, WCTV, Clear Channel Radio, Coke and the City of Tallahassee.
