= Stevie Ray Vaughan Memorial =

Bronze sculpture in Austin, Texas, U.S.

- The sculpture in 2011
- Artist: Ralph Helmick
- Year: 1993
- Type: Sculpture
- Medium: Bronze
- Subject: Stevie Ray Vaughan
- Dimensions: 240 cm × 110 cm × 400 cm (94 in × 43 in × 156 in);
- Location: Austin, Texas, United States; 30.263109°N 97.750672°W

Stevie Ray Vaughan Memorial is a bronze sculpture of Stevie Ray Vaughan by Ralph Helmick. The statue is an iconic landmark along the Ann and Roy Butler Hike-and-Bike Trail on Auditorium Shores of Lady Bird Lake in Austin, Texas, United States, an outdoor venue where Vaughan performed many concerts.

== Description and history ==
The Stevie Ray Vaughan Memorial is an approximately eight-foot-tall bronze statue. The statue depicts Vaughan in a calm stance cloaked in a poncho and wide-brimmed hat, with his electric guitar by his side. A flat bronze “shadow” behind the statue is a sculpted silhouette of Vaughan playing guitar. The sculpture is installed on a low, limestone rubble masonry and concrete pedestal.

Helmick began working independently on the project. Other funding came from private donations. Argos Foundry of Brewster, New York fabricated the art piece in 1993. With strong public backing, the City of Austin approved its permanent placement along the hike-and-bike trail. The Austin Parks & Recreation Department installed the work in 1994 and maintains it. It has become a popular tourist attraction, and often has flowers and other devotions at its base.
