= Willie Harris =

American baseball player (born 1978)

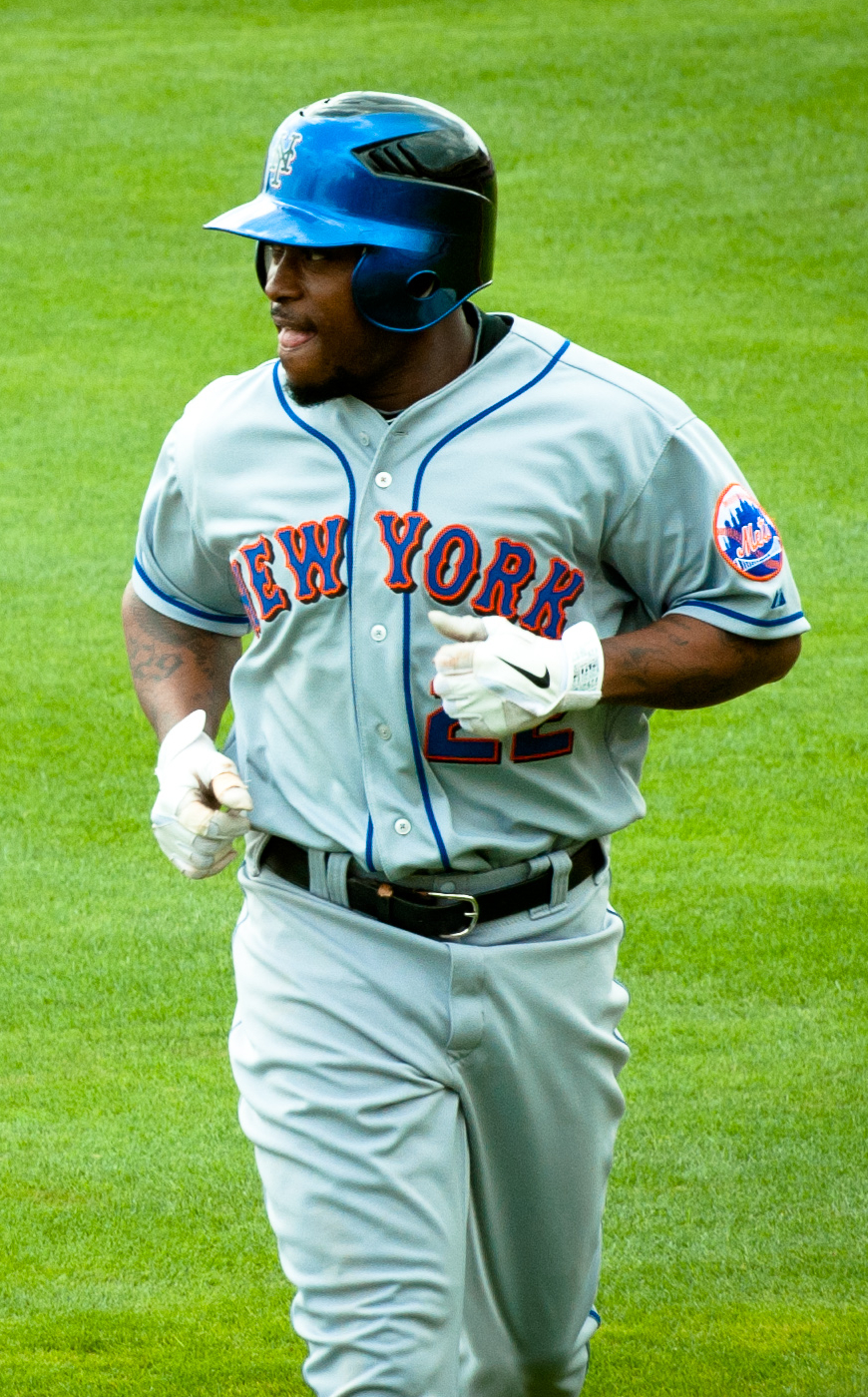
- Harris with the New York Mets in 2011

Cincinnati Reds – No. 99
- Outfielder / Second baseman / Coach
- Born: June 22, 1978 (age 48); Cairo, Georgia, U.S.
- Batted: Left Threw: Right

MLB debut
- September 2, 2001, for the Baltimore Orioles

Last MLB appearance
- June 24, 2012, for the Cincinnati Reds

MLB statistics
- Batting average: .238
- Home runs: 39
- Runs batted in: 212
- Stats at Baseball Reference

Teams
- As player: Baltimore Orioles (2001); Chicago White Sox (2002–2005); Boston Red Sox (2006); Atlanta Braves (2007); Washington Nationals (2008–2010); New York Mets (2011); Cincinnati Reds (2012); As coach: Chicago Cubs (2021–2024); Cincinnati Reds (2026–present)

Career highlights and awards
- World Series champion (2005)

William Charles Harris (born June 22, 1978) is an American professional baseball coach who currently serves as the third base coach for the Cincinnati Reds of Major League Baseball (MLB). He is also a former outfielder and second baseman who played for the Baltimore Orioles, Chicago White Sox, Boston Red Sox, Atlanta Braves, Washington Nationals, New York Mets and Cincinnati Reds between 2001 and 2012. With the White Sox, he won the 2005 World Series against the Houston Astros. He batted left-handed and threw right-handed.

He attended Middle Georgia State University and Kennesaw State University and lives in Cairo, Georgia during the off-season. He is the nephew of former third baseman and shortstop for the Milwaukee Brewers and San Francisco Giants, Ernest Riles.

== Playing career ==
Versatility and speed are his biggest strengths, as Harris has the ability to play all three outfield positions as well as second base, where he started 28 games in 2005. He started two games at shortstop in 2005. He can also play third base. His most productive season came in 2004, when he posted career-numbers in average (.262), RBI (27), runs (68), hits (107), doubles (15) and at-bats (409). Harris also notched a career high of 19 stolen bases. In 2005, he stole 10 bases in 56 games.

In the 2005 playoffs, Harris went 2-for-2 in the postseason with an RBI, one stolen base, and one run scored. Harris' successful pinch-hit single in Game 4 of the 2005 World Series against the Houston Astros would prove to be decisive after Harris scored on an RBI single by Jermaine Dye. Not only was the run the game-winner, it was the only run which would be scored in the Series-clinching Game 4.

=== 2006 ===
The Boston Red Sox signed Harris to a one-year, split contract. He went to spring training camp as a non-roster invitee, but he was figured to have a strong chance to make the Opening Day roster. On April 20, Harris had his contract purchased by the Red Sox and was added to the 40-man roster. Harris was designated for assignment on July 18. Three days later, he cleared waivers and was assigned to the Triple–A Pawtucket Red Sox.

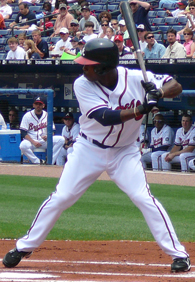
Harris with the Braves in 2007.

=== 2007 ===
The Atlanta Braves and Oakland Athletics completed a trade on April 29, 2007, as the Braves sent outfielder Ryan Langerhans to the A's in exchange for a player to be named later or cash considerations. To fill Langerhans' spot, Atlanta purchased the contract of Harris from the Triple–A Richmond Braves.

Harris went on to have a career year in 2007. He hit near .400 during the month of May and went into the All-Star Break with a .342 average. He led the team with 17 stolen bases. On June 30, Harris tied a career personal record with 3 stolen bases in a 6–5 win over the Miami Marlins. He posted a remarkable night on July 21: In a 14–6 rout of the St. Louis Cardinals, Harris went 6-for-6 with four singles, two triples, six RBI, four runs scored, and a stolen base. He became just the second player in Atlanta history and the seventh in franchise history to have six hits in a game. But Harris' numbers in the second half of the season dropped precipitously. He had a .214 average, a .294 on-base percentage, and a .354 slugging average after the all-star break.

On August 9, the Braves were beating the NL East-leading New York Mets 7-3 entering the bottom of the 9th at Shea Stadium. After Braves reliever Tyler Yates yielded three runs to bring the Mets within one, Óscar Villarreal came on to pitch. The first hitter he faced, first baseman Carlos Delgado, hit what appeared to be a solo home run to make it a tie game. Harris ranged back in left field, stopped just before the wall and jumped, robbing the home run and preserving the lead.

Harris was designated for assignment on December 4, 2007. Harris was not offered a new contract by the Braves and became a free agent on December 12.

=== 2008–2009 ===
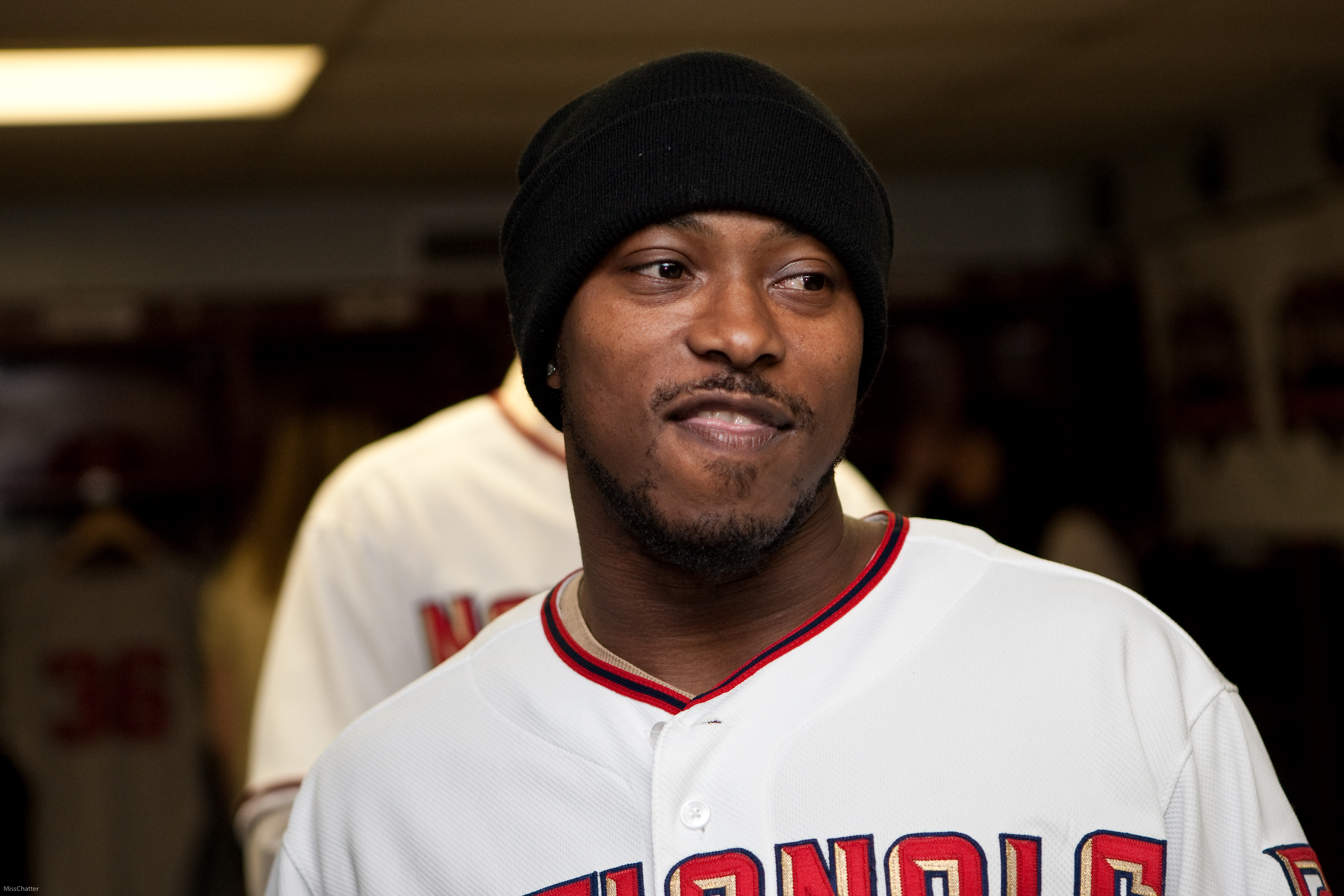
Harris during his tenure with the Nationals in 2009.

On December 13, 2007, Harris signed with the Washington Nationals. He proved an effective insurance policy, playing second base, third base, shortstop and all three outfield positions over the course of the season. He was known for playing stellar defense, and made several outstanding athletic catches in the outfield. On August 22, 2008, Harris hit his 11th and 12th home runs of the year, including his first career grand slam that gave the Nationals a 6–4 lead. He also hit a two–run home run, collected 6 RBI to give him 38 for the season, scored 3 times, and stole a base in the Nationals' 13–5 win against the Chicago Cubs at Wrigley Field. Harris finished the season with 13 home runs, six more than he hit in the previous seven years of his career combined.

During the 2008–2009 offseason, he signed a two-year contract with the Nationals, worth 3 million dollars (1.5 million per season). On April 13, 2009, Harris was placed on the 15–day disabled list with a left oblique strain.

=== 2010 ===
On September 24, 2010, Harris hit the first inside-the-park home run in Nationals history against the Atlanta Braves.

=== 2011 ===
On January 14, 2011, Harris and the New York Mets agreed to a minor-league contract. According to reporter Anthony DiComo, Harris "is all but a lock to make the team in an arrangement that should net him between 250 and 400 plate appearances" in 2011. The deal included an invitation to major league spring training.

Harris played in 126 games for the Mets at all three outfield positions as well as second and third base. He had a .351 on–base percentage and an OPS+ of 88.

=== 2012 ===
On January 23, 2012, Harris signed with the Cincinnati Reds. On June 26, Harris was removed from the 40–man roster and sent outright to the Triple–A Louisville Bats. Harris was hitting at a .114 clip, with a .170 OBP, two RBI, and no home runs in 44 at–bats before being demoted.

== Coaching career ==
Harris started his professional coaching career in the Pioneer Baseball League as the hitting coach for the Great Falls Voyagers in 2016. At the time, the Voyagers were the rookie-level affiliate of the Chicago White Sox.

Harris was named as the Manager of the Richmond Flying Squirrels in the San Francisco Giants organization for the 2018 season. In 2019, Harris was named the Cincinnati Reds baserunning and outfield coordinator.

On December 8, 2020, Harris was hired by the Chicago Cubs as their third base coach. On October 11, 2024, Harris and the Cubs agreed to mutually part ways.

On January 28, 2025, the Cincinnati Reds hired Harris to serve as the manager for their Single-A affiliate, the Daytona Tortugas. On November 3, the Reds promoted Harris to the role of third base coach on their major league coaching staff.

== See also ==
- List of Major League Baseball single-game hits leaders

Preceded by Will Venable	Chicago Cubs third base coach 2021–2024	Succeeded by Quintin Berry
