= Cairo High School =

Public high school in Cairo, Georgia, United States

Location
- 455 5th St SE; Cairo, Georgia 39828; United States; 30°52′20″N 84°12′01″W

Information
- Type: High School (Charter School)
- Motto: With Pride, We Give Our Best
- Established: 1910
- School district: Grady County Schools
- Principal: William Huff
- Teaching staff: 79.40 (on an FTE basis)
- Grades: 9–12
- Enrollment: 1,298 (2023–2024)
- Student to teacher ratio: 16.35
- Colors: Red and black
- Mascot: Syrup Pitcher
- Nickname: Syrupmakers, Syrupmaids
- Rival: Thomasville High School; Thomas County Central High School; Bainbridge High School
- Yearbook: Raconteur
- Website: chs.grady.k12.ga.us
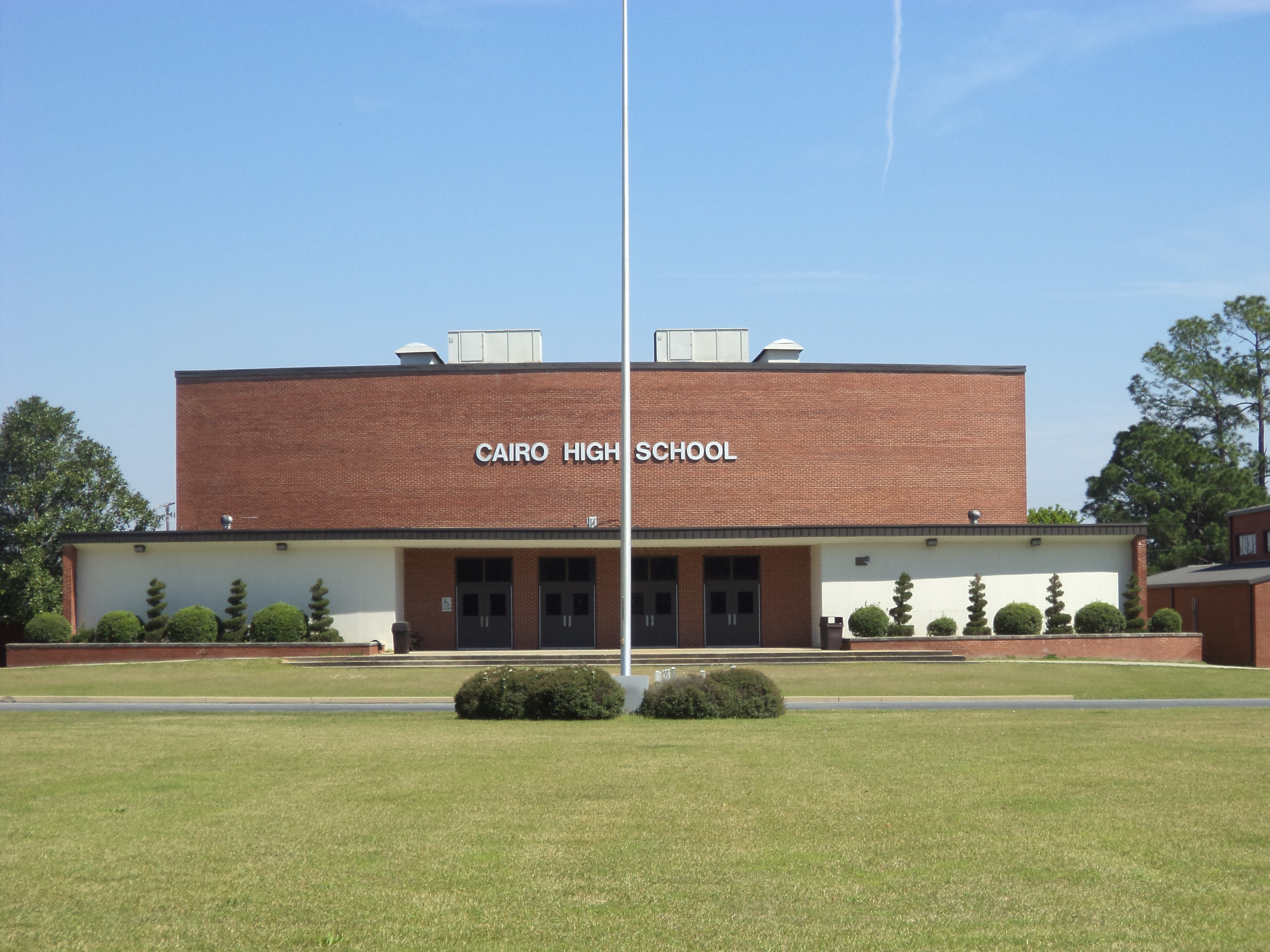
- Cairo High School in 2014

Cairo High School is a public high school in Cairo, Georgia. United States. The school's motto is "With Pride, We Give Our Best." Cairo High School was recognized as the SAT Region Winner for Class AAA and Region 1-AAA for 2005 and 2006. CHS students showed three-year average gains in reading and math SAT scores.

== History ==
Cairo is nicknamed the "syrup city" because Roddenbery's syrup plant was formerly located in Cairo. Cairo High School's athletics teams were known as the Tigers until the late 1940s, when they were renamed the Syrupmakers.

== Mascot ==
The school mascot is depicted as a syrup pitcher. The term is often shortened to "Maids" for the girls or "Makers" for the boys. Local legend describes the name originating from an event where workers from the Roddenbery Syrup Company brought the team company rain jackets to wear during a particularly stormy game.

In 1986, ESPN voted the Syrupmakers the best high school mascot in the US. In 2023, Sports Illustrated named the Syrupmakers as the "Best high school mascot in Georgia with 94.81% of the votes.

== Rivalry trophies ==
The Barnett's Creek Water Bucket is the trophy awarded to the winner of the annual football game between Thomas County Central High School and Cairo High School. This rivalry, dating back to the 1960s, is one of the most prominent in southwest Georgia. In 1994, local fire chiefs Billy Joe Lewis and Logan Lewis established the bucket trophy after discovering an old water bucket near Barnett's Creek, a natural boundary between the counties. The bucket was once used to draw water for firefighting, symbolizing the shared history of the communities.

The Julien Roddenbery Syrup Pitcher Trophy is awarded to the winner of the annual football game between Cairo High School and Thomasville High School. First contested in 1953, this rivalry is one of the longest-standing in southwest Georgia. The trophy is named in honor of Julian Roddenbery, a Cairo businessman and strong supporter of local athletics. The syrup pitcher design symbolizes Cairo's rich history in the syrup industry, a key part of the community's identity. The game remains a highly anticipated tradition, with both schools competing for regional bragging rights and the coveted trophy each year.

== Concert and marching band ==
The Cairo High School band was first established in September 1946 and first took the field in 1947 during a football game.

Joe David III was the band director from 1984 to 1996. He was an inductee into the Georgia Bandmaster's Hall of Fame and was awarded the Georgia Music Educators Association Distinguished Career Award. A music scholarship was established after his death to aid members of the band in a pursuit of a music major in college. The award is $1000 and awarded annually.

The band was referred to as "The Pride of Dixie" and is currently known as the "Pride of the Syrup City."

== Expansion ==
The Career Academy at Cairo High School is a 20,000 square foot facility opened in October 2017. It was funded by a $3.5 million grant from the Technical College System of Georgia's Office of college and Career Transitions. The center provides students with resources for college applications, career planning, and job searches. In collaboration with the University of Georgia, the center helps students transition to higher education or the workforce. is designed to offer students hands-on learning in fields such as welding, healthcare, and digital technology. This initiative aims to address local workforce needs by equipping students with valuable career skills.

In 2021, Cairo High School's West Thomas Stadium, which has been a staple of the community, underwent a major renovation with the installation of an artificial turf field at a cost of $1,006,148. It now boasts a modern playing surface designed to meet high school athletic standards, and aligning with a broader trend of high schools transitioning to artificial turf for improved performance and sustainability. The new field features enhanced drainage, durability, and year-round usability, benefiting not only the school's football team but also markings and goals for soccer.

In 2022, the old student bleachers at the north endzone were removed

In April 2024, the visitor bleachers were replaced.

The JROTC building was damaged in 2018 by Hurricane Michael and in 2019 by a tornado, and was replaced in 2020.

== Notable alumni ==
- Teresa Edwards, former professional basketball player; Olympic gold medalist
- Cliff Hammonds, professional basketball player
- Willie Harris, member of the 2005 World Champion Chicago White Sox; member of the Cincinnati Reds
- David Ponder, former NFL defensive tackle
- Daryle Singletary, country music singer
- Bill Stanfill, former All-Pro National Football League defensive end
- Gordon Thomas, British secret intelligence author and journalist
- Mickey Thomas, lead singer for rock band Starship
- Bobby Walden, NFL football player, member of the Georgia Sports Hall of Fame, nicknamed "The Big Toe from Cairo"
- J.J. Wilcox, professional football player drafted 2013 by Dallas Cowboys (2013-current); safety
- Seaborn Anderson Roddenbery
