= Arthur Fiedler =

American conductor (1894–1979)

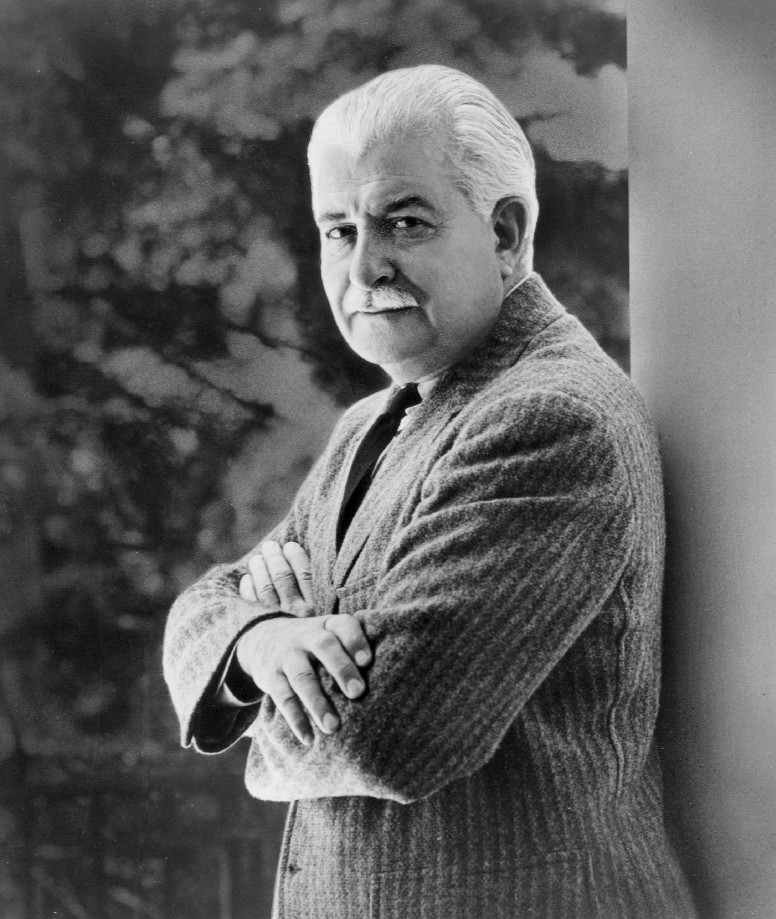
- Fiedler in 1968

Background information
- Born: December 17, 1894; Hyde Park, Boston, Massachusetts, U.S.
- Died: July 10, 1979 (aged 84) Brookline, Massachusetts, U.S.
- Occupation: Conductor
- Instruments: Violin, piano, percussion, organ
- Years active: 1915–1979

Arthur Fiedler (December 17, 1894 – July 10, 1979) was an American conductor notable for his association with both the Boston Symphony and Boston Pops orchestras. With a combination of musicianship and showmanship, he made the Boston Pops one of the best-known orchestras in the United States. Fiedler was sometimes criticized for over-popularizing music, particularly when adapting popular songs or editing portions of the classical repertoire, but he kept performances informal and sometimes self-mocking to attract a bigger audience.

== Life and career ==
Fiedler was born in Boston, Massachusetts, the son of Johanna (née Bernfeld) and Emanuel Fiedler (1859–1944). His parents were Austrian-Jewish émigrés. Emanuel was a violinist who played in the Boston Symphony Orchestra, and Johanna was a pianist. Fiedler grew up in Boston and attended Boston Latin School until his father retired in the early 1900s, and they moved to Vienna, Austria, in 1910. The family soon moved again, this time to Berlin, where young Fiedler studied violin at the Royal Academy of Music (Hochschule für Musik Berlin) under Willy Hess from 1911 to 1915. Fiedler returned to Boston early in World War I. In 1915, he joined the Boston Symphony Orchestra as a violinist under conductor Karl Muck. Fiedler also worked as a pianist, organist, and percussionist. He was not related to former Boston Symphony conductor Max Fiedler.

In 1924, Fiedler formed the Boston Sinfonietta, a chamber music orchestra composed of Boston Symphony members, and started a series of free outdoor concerts.

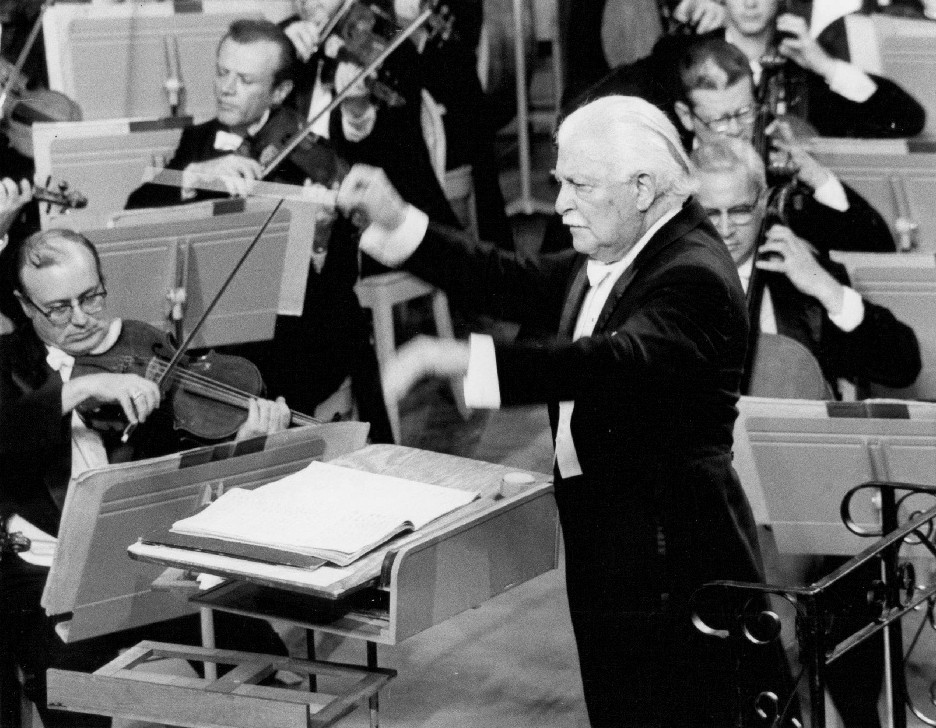
Fiedler conducting the Boston Pops Orchestra in 1969

Fiedler was appointed the eighteenth conductor of the Boston Pops Orchestra in 1930. While the position of conductor of the Boston Pops both before and after Fiedler tended to be a phase of a conductor's career, Fiedler made it his life's work, holding the position for nearly 50 years.

With Fiedler's direction, the Boston Pops reportedly made more recordings than any other orchestra in the world, most of them for RCA Red Seal, with total sales exceeding $50 million. His recordings began in July 1935 at Boston's Symphony Hall with RCA Victor, including a world premiere recording of Jacob Gade's "Jalousie", which eventually sold over a million copies, and the first complete recording of Rhapsody in Blue by George Gershwin (with Jesús María Sanromá as soloist; around that time it also made the first recording of Edward MacDowell's Second Concerto). In 1946, Fiedler conducted the Boston Pops in one of the first American recordings devoted to excerpts from a film score, Dmitri Tiomkin's music for the David O. Selznick Technicolor epic Duel in the Sun. RCA Victor released an album of ten-inch 78-rpm discs complete with photographs from the film.

Fiedler's June 20, 1947, MM-1147 recording of Gaîté Parisienne by Jacques Offenbach was eventually released by RCA as its second long-playing classical album (RCA Victor LM-1001), in March of 1950. Fiedler recorded the same music on June 2, 1954, in stereo and began making regular stereo recordings in 1956. A number of Fiedler's recordings were released as 45-rpm extended-play discs, beginning in 1949, such as Tchaikovsky's Marche Slave and Ketèlbey's In a Persian Market (RCA Victor ERA-2). Besides recording light classics, Fiedler also recorded music from Broadway shows and Hollywood film scores, as well as arrangements of popular music, especially the Beatles. He and the Boston Pops occasionally recorded classical works that were favorites, but not considered as "light" as most of the pieces that he conducted. Fiedler made but a single recording with the Boston Symphony Orchestra: Dvorak's New World Symphony. There were also recordings of chamber music by his Sinfonietta. Fiedler and the Boston Pops recorded exclusively for RCA Victor until 1970 (though the label has continued to issue many new Fiedler/Boston Pops compilations and unreleased recordings). When the Boston Symphony Hall contract with RCA ended, the hall, which included the BSO and the BPO, signed with Deutsche Grammophon for classical releases with co-owned Polydor Records for his arrangements of pop music compositions and then London Records. Fiedler's last album, devoted to disco, was titled Saturday Night Fiedler.

Fiedler was also associated with the San Francisco Pops Orchestra for 26 summers (beginning during 1949) and conducted many other orchestras throughout the world. He was a featured conductor on several of NBC's The Standard Hour programs in 1950 and 1951, conducting the San Francisco Symphony in the War Memorial Opera House; the performances were preserved on transcription discs and later released on audio cassette.

In very rare visiting performances, Fiedler accepted the invitation to conduct Don Caneva's John Hersey High School Bands after reviewing their latest recordings. Caneva said, “I was tremendously pleased and delighted when he said he would accept our invitation, after hearing a recent recording of the band." Fiedler ended up conducting twice for Caneva's bands in 1971 and 1972. In the final 1972 performance, the band opened the Symphonic Winds portion of the concert with the "Festive Overture" by Dmitri Schostakovich, followed with the "American Salute" by Morton Gould. For the conclusion of this portion, Fiedler chose "The Finale From The New World Symphony" by Anton Dvorak. He also conducted Leroy Anderson's "Serenata" with the high school band.

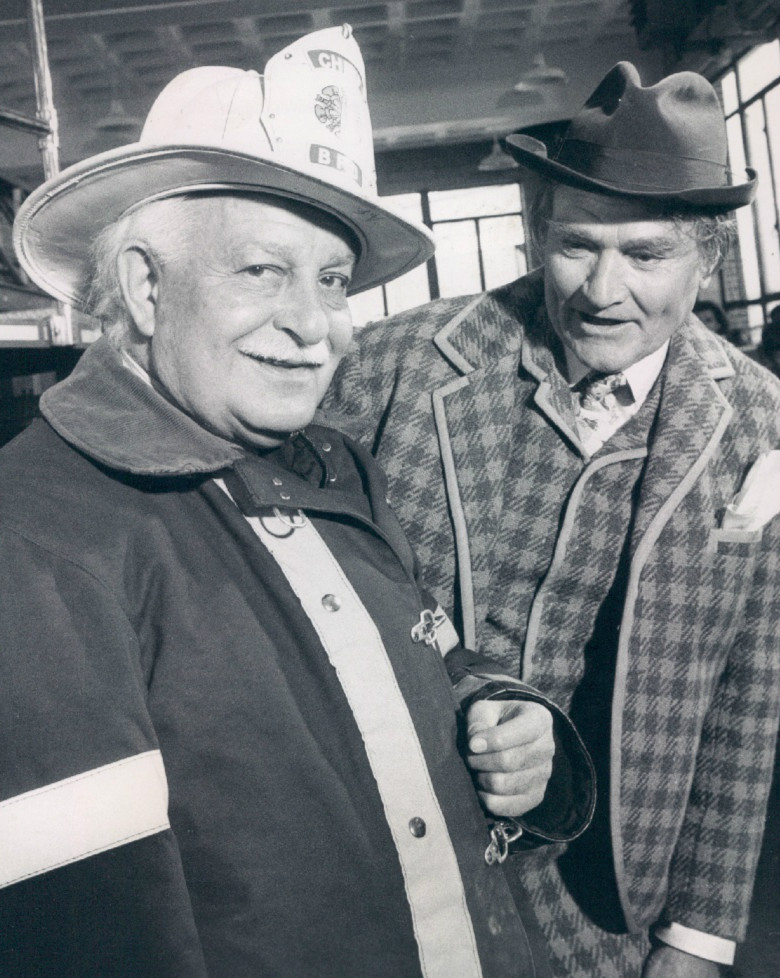
Fiedler dressed for the part of a fireman for a show skit. Red Skelton is dressed as Clem Kadiddlehopper.

Fiedler had many different hobbies. He was fascinated by the work of firefighters and would travel in his own vehicle to large fires in and around Boston at any time of the day or night to watch the firefighters at work. Fiedler was even made an "Honorary Captain" in the Boston Fire Department. Many other fire departments gave him honorary fire helmets and/or badges. The official biography of Fiedler reports that the conductor once helped in the rescue efforts at the tragic Cocoanut Grove fire in Boston in 1942. An avid sailor, he volunteered during the early days of World War II for the Temporary Reserve of the U.S. Coast Guard and was later a member of the Coast Guard Auxiliary.

Fiedler conducted at the nationally televised opening ceremonies of Walt Disney World in 1971. He also appeared on numerous telecasts on Evening at Pops, carried on PBS stations nationwide.

In 1972, Fiedler was awarded an Honorary Doctorate of Music from Berklee College of Music.

Fiedler is best remembered by contemporary audiences for his conducting of the Boston Pops at the outdoor Hatch Memorial Shell on the July 4, 1976, celebration of the U.S. Bicentennial. The rendition of the 1812 Overture led by a jacketless and demonstrative Fiedler, capped by a huge fireworks finale over the Charles River was the climax of all day long network television coverage. The video of the aged but obviously delighted Fiedler puffing out his cheeks to the beat of the music and mugging for his musicians was one of the most talked about images of the country's celebration.

In honor of Fiedler's influence on American music, on October 23, 1976, he was awarded the prestigious University of Pennsylvania Glee Club Award of Merit. Beginning in 1964, this award "established to bring a declaration of appreciation to an individual each year that has made a significant contribution to the world of music and helped to create a climate in which our talents may find valid expression."

On January 10, 1977, Fiedler was presented with the Presidential Medal of Freedom by President Gerald Ford.

== Personal life ==
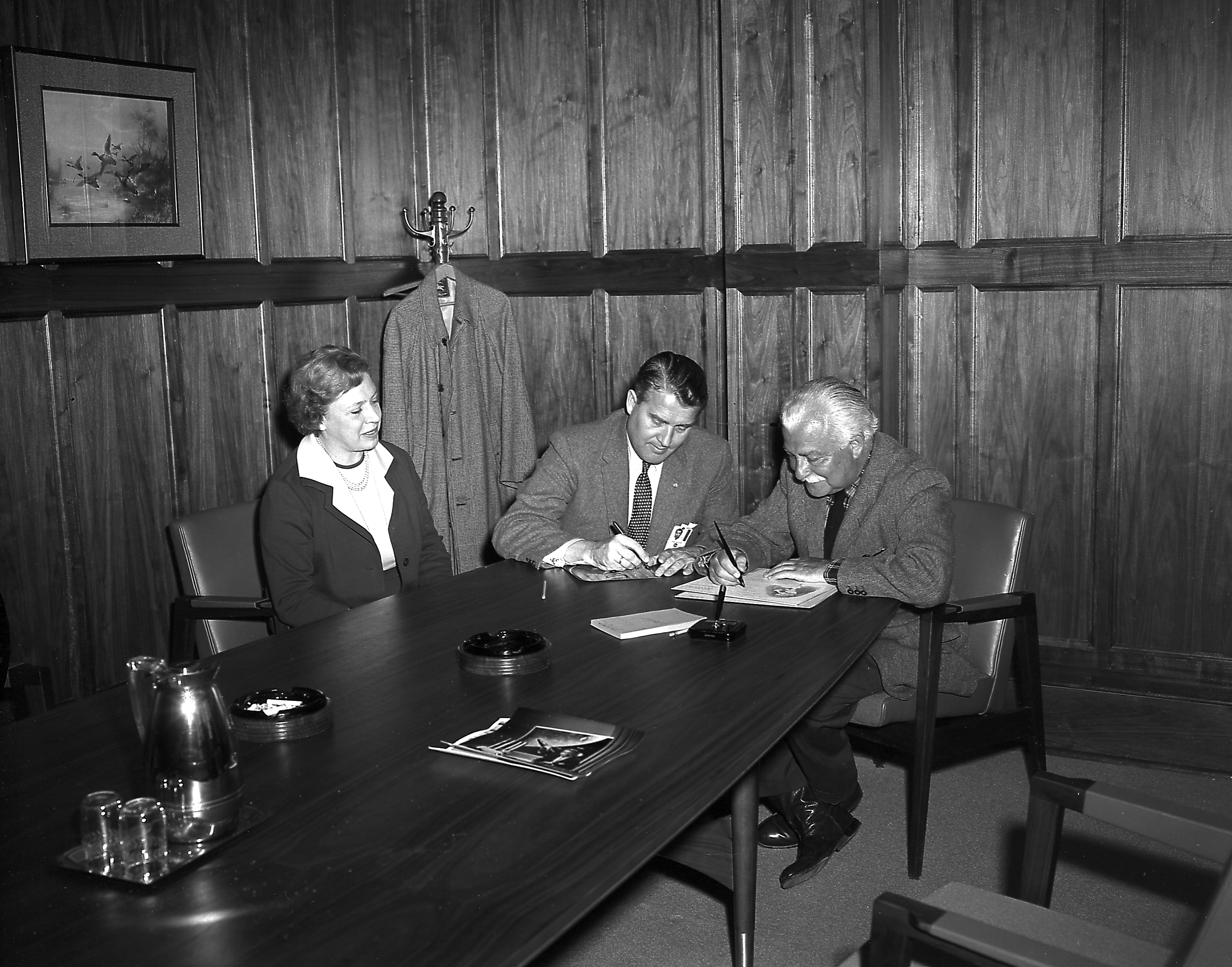
Mr. and Mrs. Arthur Fiedler and Wernher von Braun in his office during the Fiedlers' visit to the Marshall Space Flight Center on March 23, 1962.

In 1942, Fiedler married Ellen Bottomley, and they had three children: Johanna, Peter, and Deborah Stiles.

In 1994, Doubleday published a book written by Fiedler's daughter, Johanna, titled Arthur Fiedler: Papa, the Pops and Me.

== Death ==
In December 1978, Fiedler underwent brain surgery at Tufts Medical Center after suffering congestive heart failure. He recovered two weeks after celebrating his 84th birthday. His final Boston Pops season was in 1979. The season began on May 1 with a concert to mark Fiedler's 50th year as the orchestra's conductor. The works he conducted at that concert include Jacques Offenbach's Overture to La belle Hélène, Gershwin's An American in Paris and Rhapsody in Blue, and Sousa's "The Stars and Stripes Forever". Morton Gould composed a work for the occasion: a march titled "Cheers!". Earl Wild played the piano solo for Rhapsody in Blue. The concert was broadcast on WGBH for its Evening at Pops program. Fiedler made a valedictory appearance on May 5, with James Galway as a flute soloist. Fiedler died of a heart attack on July 10 at his Brookline, Massachusetts home; he was 84 years old. On July 15, the Boston Symphony Orchestra performed a recreation of the July 4, 1976, concert at the Hatch Memorial Shell. It was conducted by the Boston Pops' assistant conductor, Harry Ellis Dickson. Fiedler's funeral service was held at the Memorial Church of Harvard University and his ashes were interred at St. Joseph Cemetery in West Roxbury.

In 1984, Boston honored Fiedler with a stylized sculpture, an oversized bust of him, near the Charles River Esplanade. This area is home to the free concert series that continues through the present day. Composer John Williams succeeded Fiedler as the orchestra's nineteenth conductor. His widow, Ellen Bottomley Fiedler, died October 25, 1984, in Framingham, Massachusetts, at age 70.

Fiedler's collection of programs, photographs and personal notes are now housed within the Howard Gotlieb Archival Research Center of Boston University. The university has a reading room named after him; it contains Fiedler's personal collection of scores and books.

== See also ==
- Arthur Fiedler Footbridge
- Arthur Fiedler Memorial

== Sources ==
- Dickson, Harry Ellis (1981). Arthur Fiedler and the Boston Pops: An irreverent memoir. Boston: Houghton Mifflin. ISBN 0-517-42843-1. OCLC 231756295.
- Fiedler, Johanna (1994). Arthur Fiedler: Papa, the Pops and me. New York: Doubleday. ISBN 0-385-42391-8. OCLC 243805399.
- Wilson, Carol Green (1968). Arthur Fiedler - Music for the Millions: The Story of the Conductor of the Boston Pops Orchestra. New York City: The Evans Publishing Company. OCLC 925661034.

Cultural offices
Preceded by Alfredo Casella	Conductor, Boston Pops Orchestra; 1930–1979	Succeeded by John Williams
