= Mack Robinson (sprinter) =

U.S. silver medal in the 1936 Olympics for athletics

Personal information
- Full name: Matthew MacKenzie Robinson
- Nationality: American
- Born: July 18, 1914 Cairo, Georgia, U.S.
- Died: March 12, 2000 (aged 85) Pasadena, California, U.S.
- Education: University of Oregon
- Height: 6 ft 1 in (185 cm)
- Weight: 170 lb (77 kg)

Sport
- Sport: Track and field
- Events: Sprint, Long jump
Medal record
Men's athletics
Representing the United States
Silver medal – second place	1936 Berlin	200 m

Matthew MacKenzie Robinson (July 18, 1914 – March 12, 2000) was an American track and field athlete. He is best known for winning a silver medal in the 1936 Summer Olympics, where he broke the Olympic record in the 200 meters. He was the older brother of Baseball Hall of Fame member Jackie Robinson.

== Early life ==
Robinson was born in Cairo, Georgia, in 1914. He and his siblings were left fatherless at an early age, leaving their mother, Mallie Robinson, as the sole provider for five children. She performed in a variety of manual labor tasks, and moved with her children to Pasadena, California, while the children were still young. At the start of middle school Robinson was diagnosed with a heart murmur that got worse with age, and was advised to only play non-contact sports. He remained in town for school, and set national junior college records in the 100 meter, 200 meter, and long jump at Pasadena Junior College.

== 1936 Olympics ==
Robinson placed second in the 200 meters at the United States Olympic Trials in 1936, earning himself a place on the Olympic team. He went on to win the silver medal at the Summer Olympics in Berlin, finishing 0.4 seconds behind Jesse Owens. In 2016, the 1936 Olympic journey of the eighteen Black American athletes, including Robinson, was documented in the film Olympic Pride, American Prejudice.

== Later career and life ==
Robinson attended the University of Oregon, graduating in 1941. With Oregon he won numerous titles in NCAA, AAU and Pacific Coast Conference track meets. He has been honored as being one of the most distinguished graduates of the University of Oregon and is a member of the University of Oregon Hall of Fame and the Oregon Sports Hall of Fame.

For a time in the early 1970s, Robinson was a park director of Lemon Grove Park, a park in the East Hollywood part of the City of Los Angeles.

Later in life, he was known for leading the fight against street crime in his home town of Pasadena. The Pasadena Robinson Memorial, dedicated to both Matthew and Jackie, was dedicated in 1997. The memorial statue of Jackie Robinson by sculptor Richard H. Ellis at UCLA Bruins baseball team's home Jackie Robinson Stadium, was installed by the efforts of Robinson.

Several locations are named in honor of Matthew Robinson. In addition to the Pasadena Robinson Memorial, the stadium of Pasadena City College was dedicated to him in 2000. That same year, the United States Postal Service approved naming the new post office in Pasadena the Matthew 'Mack' Robinson Post Office Building.

Robinson died of complications from diabetes, kidney failure, and pneumonia, on March 12, 2000, at a hospital in Pasadena, California; he was 85. He is interred at Mountain View Cemetery and Mausoleum, Altadena, California.
