= Cairo, Georgia =

- City
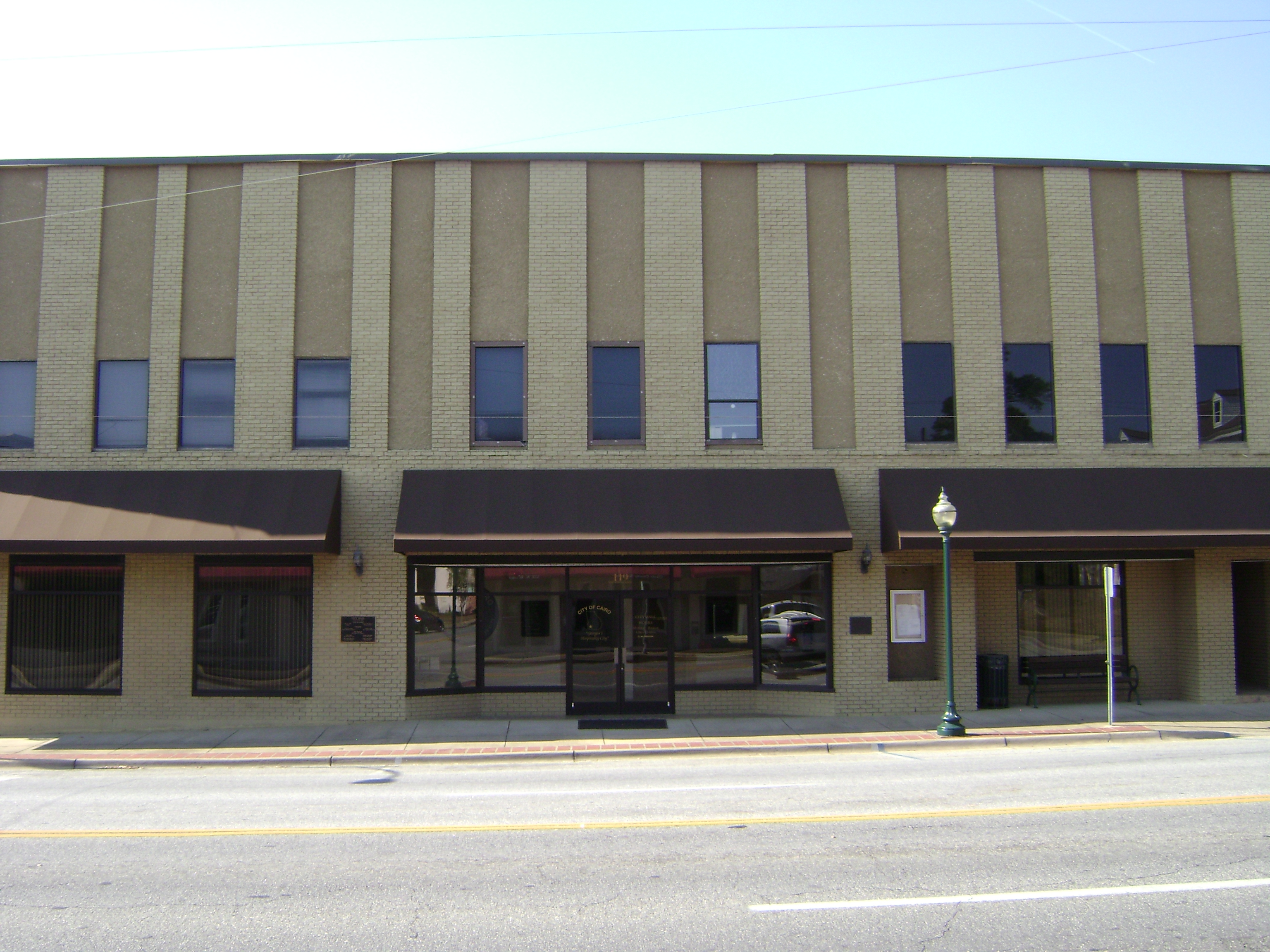
- Cairo City Hall

- Flag Seal
- Nicknames: "Georgia's Hospitality City", and "The Syrup City"
- Location in Grady County and the state of Georgia
- Coordinates: 30°52′39″N 84°12′5″W
- Country: United States
- State: Georgia
- County: Grady

Government
  - Mayor: Booker Gainor

Area
  - Total: 9.95 sq mi (25.77 km^{2})
  - Land: 9.81 sq mi (25.42 km^{2})
  - Water: 0.14 sq mi (0.35 km^{2})
- Elevation: 243 ft (74 m)

Population (2020)
  - Total: 10,179
  - Density: 1,037.1/sq mi (400.44/km^{2})
- Time zone: UTC-5 (Eastern (EST))
  - Summer (DST): UTC-4 (EDT)
- ZIP codes: 39827, 39828
- Area code: 229
- FIPS code: 13-12400
- GNIS feature ID: 0354934
- Website: syrupcity.net

Cairo (/ˈkeɪroʊ/) is a city in Grady County, Georgia, United States. As of the 2020 census, the city had a population of 10,179. The city is the county seat of Grady County.

== History ==
Cairo was founded in 1835. It was incorporated as a town in 1870 and as a city in 1906. In 1905, Cairo was designated seat of the newly formed Grady County. The city was named after Cairo, the capital of Egypt.

== Geography ==
Cairo is located in central Grady County at 30°52′39″N 84°12′5″W (30.8774, -84.2013). U.S. Route 84 (38th Boulevard) passes through the northern part of the city, leading east 14 miles (23 km) to Thomasville and west 24 miles (39 km) to Bainbridge. Valdosta is 59 miles (95 km) to the east, and Dothan, Alabama, is 79 miles (127 km) to the west on US 84. Georgia State Route 93 passes through the center of Cairo as Broad Street and Fifth Street; it leads north 19 miles (31 km) to Pelham and south 12 miles (19 km) to U.S. Route 319, north of the Florida border. Tallahassee, Florida, is 33 miles (53 km) to the south.

According to the United States Census Bureau, Cairo has a total area of 9.8 square miles (25.4 km^{2}), of which 9.7 square miles (25.1 km^{2}) is land and 0.1 square miles (0.3 km^{2}), or 1.38%, is water.

=== Climate ===
The climate in this area is characterized by relatively high temperatures and evenly distributed precipitation throughout the year. According to the Köppen Climate Classification system, Cairo has a humid subtropical climate, abbreviated "Cfa" on climate maps.

Climate data for Cairo, Georgia
Month	Jan	Feb	Mar	Apr	May	Jun	Jul	Aug	Sep	Oct	Nov	Dec	Year
Mean daily maximum °F (°C)	64 (18)	66 (19)	73 (23)	80 (27)	86 (30)	90 (32)	91 (33)	91 (33)	87 (31)	81 (27)	71 (22)	65 (18)	79 (26)
Mean daily minimum °F (°C)	42 (6)	42 (6)	48 (9)	55 (13)	62 (17)	68 (20)	70 (21)	70 (21)	67 (19)	57 (14)	46 (8)	42 (6)	56 (13)
Average precipitation inches (mm)	3.9 (99)	4.1 (100)	5.3 (130)	3.9 (99)	3.4 (86)	5.5 (140)	6.4 (160)	5.6 (140)	4.4 (110)	2.5 (64)	2.6 (66)	3.5 (89)	51.2 (1,300)
Source: Weatherbase

== Demographics ==
Historical population
Census	Pop.	Note	%±
1880	275		—
1890	521		89.5%
1900	690		32.4%
1910	1,505		118.1%
1920	1,908		26.8%
1930	3,169		66.1%
1940	4,653		46.8%
1950	5,577		19.9%
1960	7,427		33.2%
1970	8,061		8.5%
1980	8,777		8.9%
1990	9,035		2.9%
2000	9,239		2.3%
2010	9,607		4.0%
2020	10,179		6.0%
U.S. Decennial Census; 1850-1870 1870-1880; 1890-1910 1920-1930; 1940 1950 1960; 1970 1980 1990; 2000 2010

=== Racial and ethnic composition ===
Cairo city, Georgia – Racial and ethnic composition Note: the US Census treats Hispanic/Latino as an ethnic category. This table excludes Latinos from the racial categories and assigns them to a separate category. Hispanics/Latinos may be of any race.
Race / Ethnicity (NH = Non-Hispanic)	Pop 2000	Pop 2010	Pop 2020	% 2000	% 2010	% 2020
White alone (NH)	3,921	3,416	3,293	42.44%	35.56%	32.35%
Black or African American alone (NH)	4,700	4,601	4,688	50.87%	47.89%	46.06%
Native American or Alaska Native alone (NH)	32	27	27	0.35%	0.28%	0.27%
Asian alone (NH)	53	52	68	0.57%	0.54%	0.67%
Pacific Islander alone (NH)	1	10	3	0.01%	0.10%	0.03%
Other race alone (NH)	4	19	50	0.04%	0.20%	0.49%
Mixed race or Multiracial (NH)	61	98	213	0.66%	1.02%	2.09%
Hispanic or Latino (any race)	467	1,384	1,837	5.05%	14.41%	18.05%
Total	9,239	9,607	10,179	100.00%	100.00%	100.00%

=== 2020 census ===
As of the 2020 census, Cairo had a population of 10,179. The median age was 36.3 years. 27.3% of residents were under the age of 18 and 16.6% of residents were 65 years of age or older. For every 100 females there were 87.4 males, and for every 100 females age 18 and over there were 82.7 males age 18 and over.

98.0% of residents lived in urban areas, while 2.0% lived in rural areas.

There were 3,932 households in Cairo, including 2,169 families; 35.2% of households had children under the age of 18 living in them. Of all households, 34.5% were married-couple households, 18.5% were households with a male householder and no spouse or partner present, and 41.2% were households with a female householder and no spouse or partner present. About 29.6% of all households were made up of individuals and 14.2% had someone living alone who was 65 years of age or older.

There were 4,363 housing units, of which 9.9% were vacant. The homeowner vacancy rate was 1.3% and the rental vacancy rate was 7.5%.

== Education ==
Grady County Schools serves the city. Cairo High School, located in Cairo serves as a central high school for all of Grady County. Elementary schools serving students in the city include Eastside Elementary, Northside Elementary and Southside Elementary. Washington Middle School serves Cairo residents.

A campus of the Southern Regional Technical College is located in Cairo.

== Health ==
Archbold Grady serves the city. A 60-bed acute care hospital, it has been affiliated with John D. Archbold Memorial Hospital in Thomasville since 1985.

== Notable people ==
Notable Cairo people include:

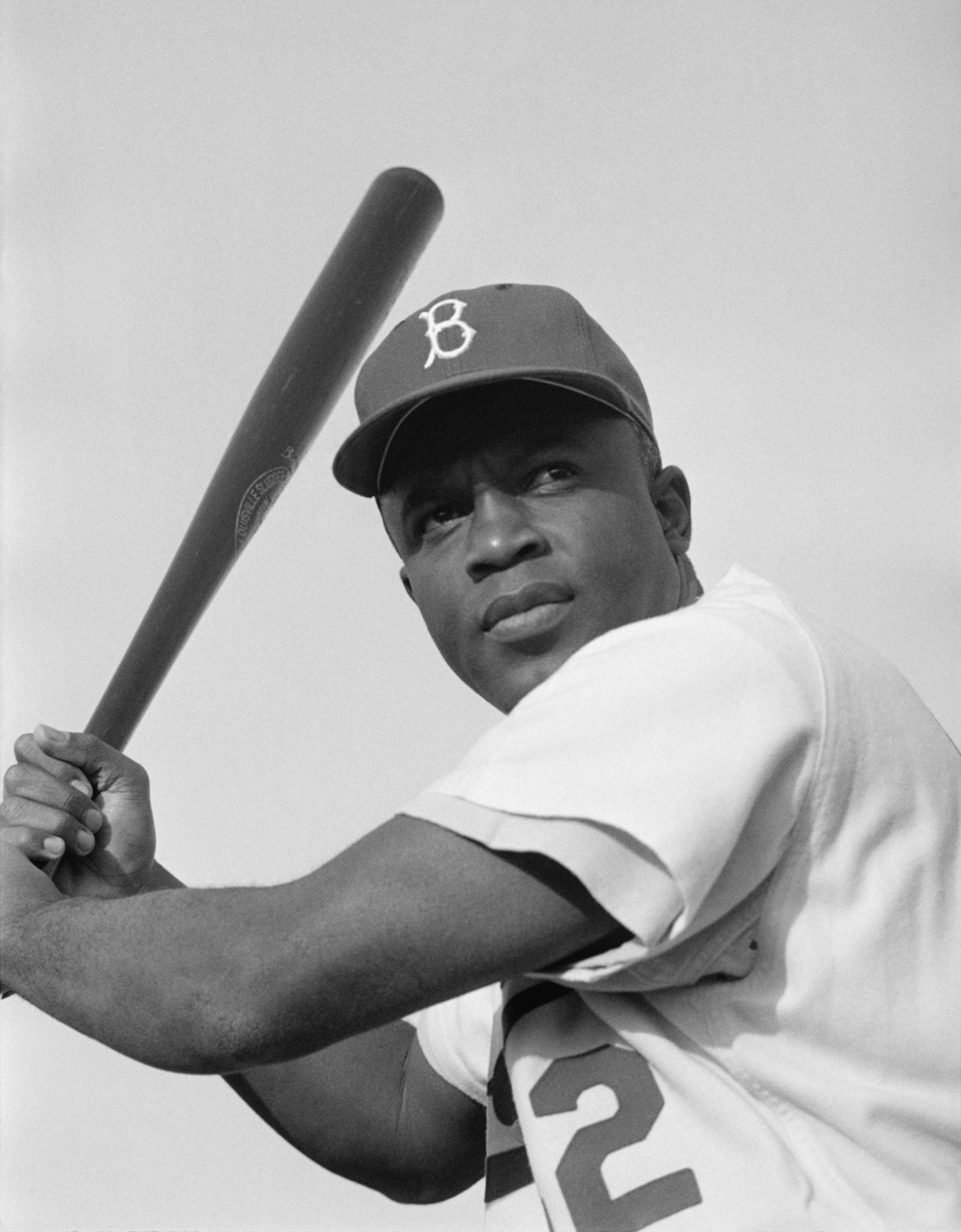
Jackie Robinson,
born 1919,
American professional baseball second baseman who became the first African American to play in Major League Baseball (MLB) in the modern era.

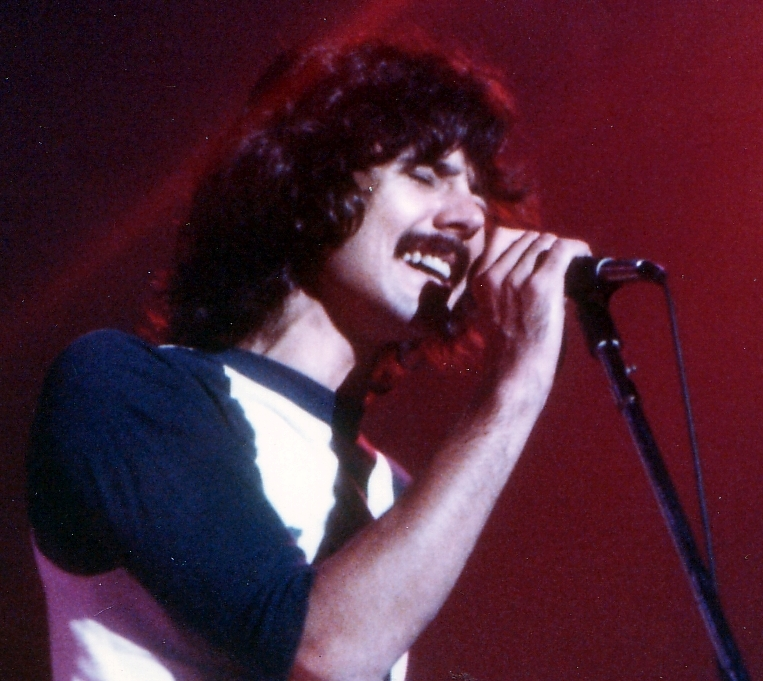
Mickey Thomas,
born 1949,
American rock singer, best known as one of the lead vocalists of Jefferson Starship and Starship.

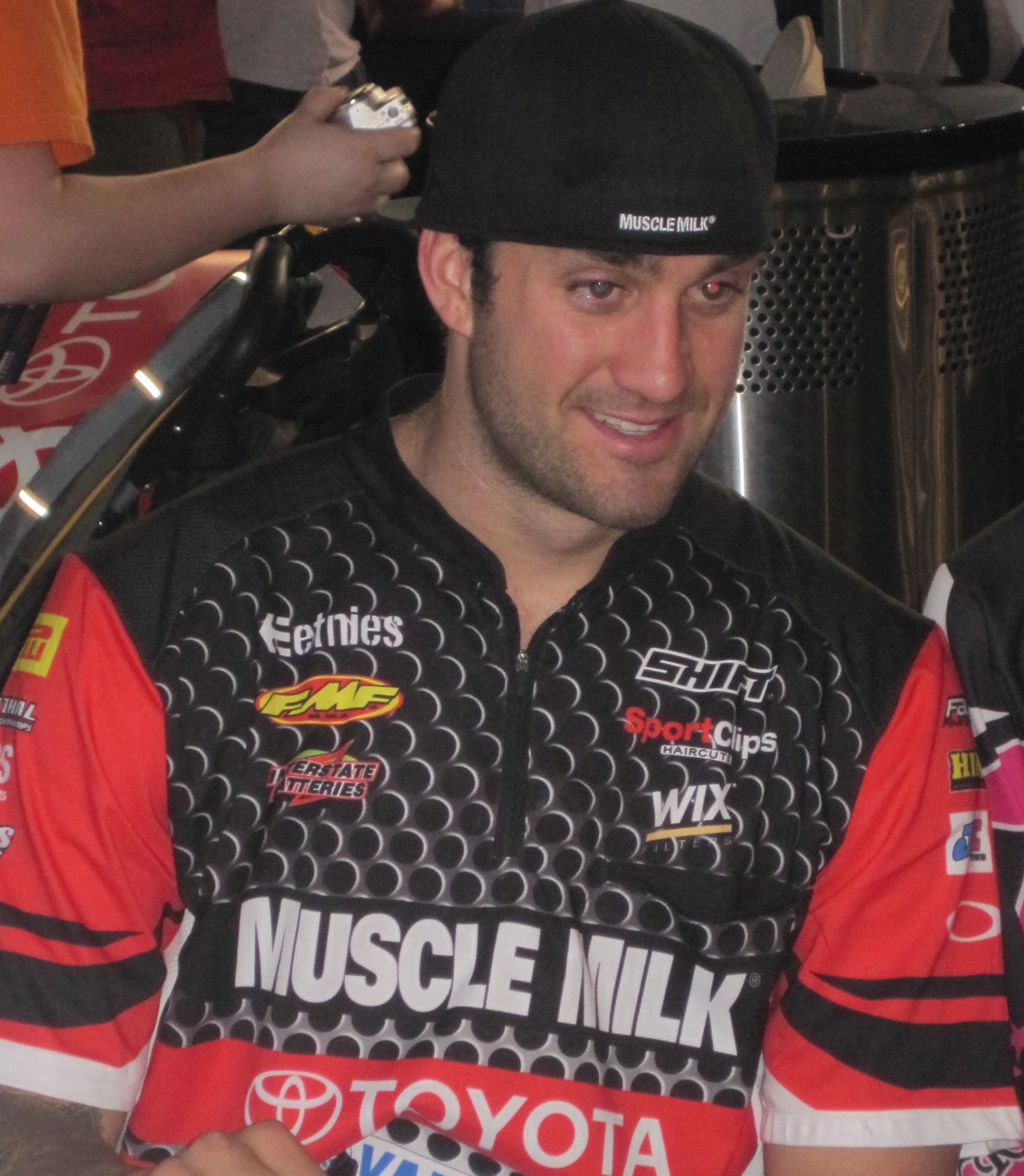
Davi Millsaps,
born 1988,
champion motocross and supercross rider.

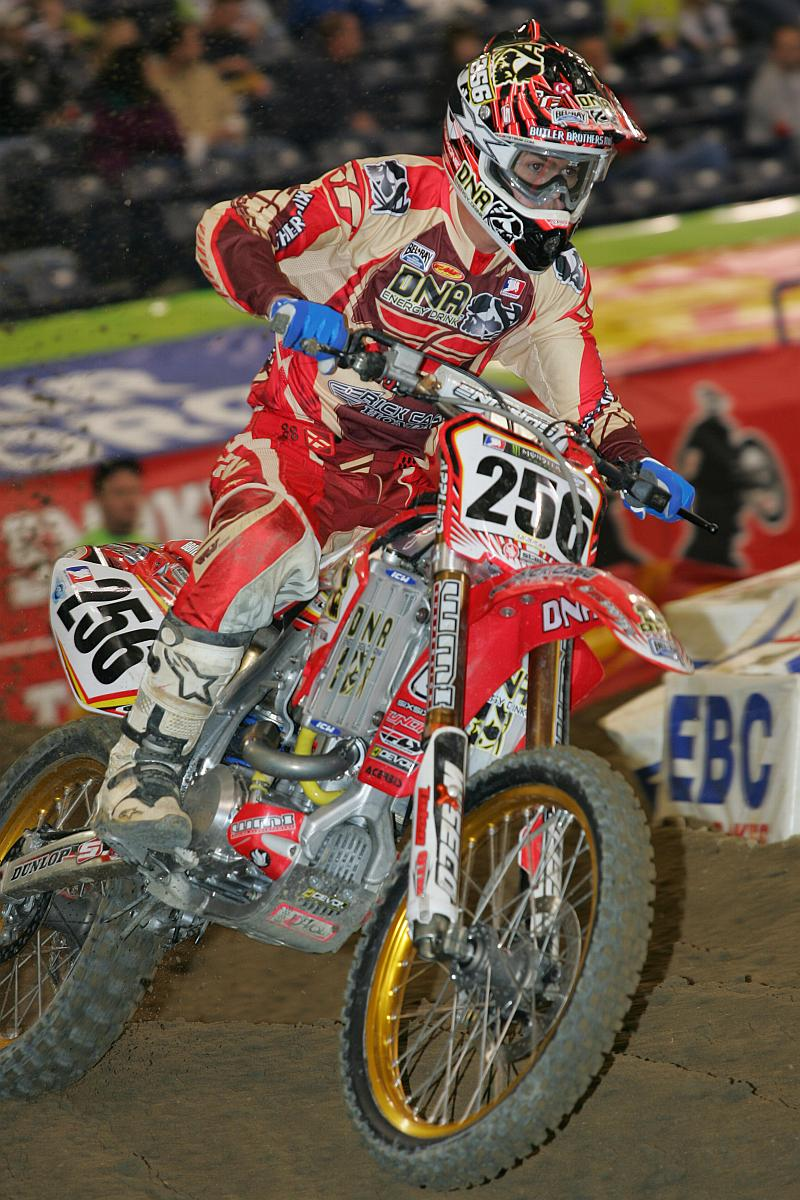
Bryan Johnson,
born 1986,
professional motocross and supercross rider.
- Teresa Edwards, former professional basketball player and an Olympic gold medalist
- Emerson Hancock, former pitcher for University of Georgia and selected to the Seattle Mariners as the 6th overall pick in the 2020 MLB draft.
- Willie Harris, outfielder and second baseman in Major League Baseball from 2001 through 2012, member of the 2005 World Champion Chicago White Sox
- Bryan Johnson, former professional motocross racer.
- John Monds, 2010 Libertarian gubernatorial candidate for the state of Georgia
- David Ponder, former defensive tackle for the Dallas Cowboys
- Ernest Riles, shortstop and third baseman in Major League Baseball
- Jackie Robinson, Baseball Hall of Famer; first person to break the color barrier in Major League Baseball; born in Cairo
- Matthew "Mack" Robinson, Olympic silver medalist, older brother of Jackie Robinson
- Daryle Singletary, country music singer
- George Thornewell Smith, Georgia politician
- Bill Stanfill, former All-Pro National Football League defensive end
- Mickey Thomas, lead singer of Jefferson Starship
- Bobby Walden, former punter for the Pittsburgh Steelers and Minnesota Vikings
- Hurston Waldrep, baseball pitcher
- J. J. Wilcox, safety for the New York Jets
- Arthur L. Williams Jr., founder of Primerica Financial Services
- Curley Williams, country music singer and songwriter; born near Cairo in Grady County
