= List of Toronto Blue Jays first-round draft picks =

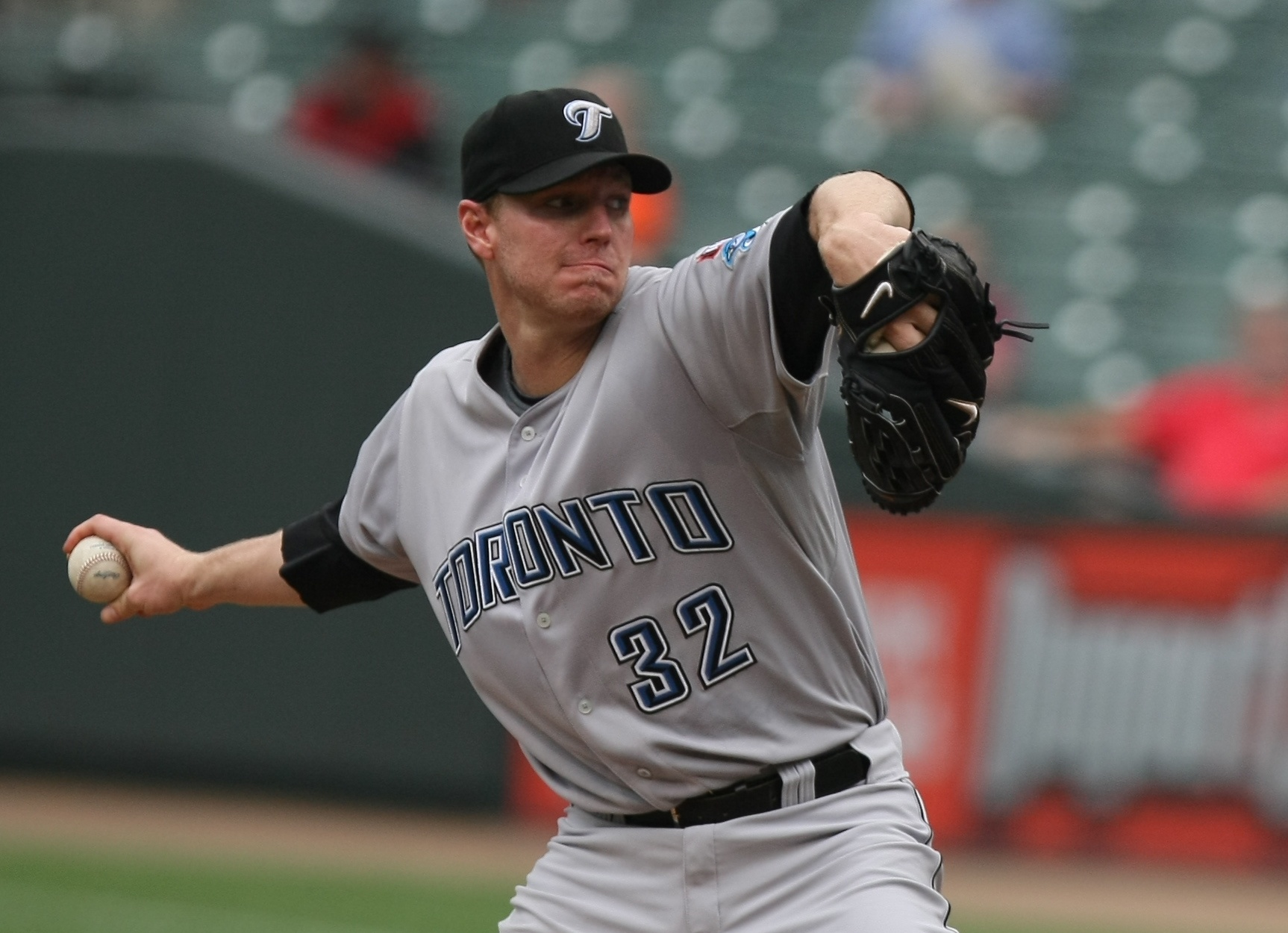
Roy Halladay (1995) is the only Blue Jays' first-round pick to be inducted into the Baseball Hall of Fame, and to win a Cy Young Award with the team.

The Toronto Blue Jays are a Major League Baseball (MLB) franchise based in Toronto, Ontario, Canada. They play in the American League East division. Since the Blue Jays' entrance into the league in 1977, the Blue Jays have selected 72 players in the first round. Officially known as the "First-Year Player Draft", the Rule 4 draft is MLB's primary mechanism for assigning amateur players from high schools, colleges, and other amateur clubs to its teams. The draft order is determined based on the previous season's standings, with the team possessing the worst record receiving the first pick. In addition, teams which lost free agents in the previous off-season may be awarded compensatory or supplementary picks. The First-Year Player Draft is unrelated to the 1976 expansion draft in which the Blue Jays initially filled their roster.

Of the 72 players picked in the first round by Toronto, 35 have been pitchers, the most of any position; 26 of them were right-handed, while nine were left-handed. 14 shortstops, 12 outfielders, four catchers and third basemen, and three first basemen have also been selected. The team has never drafted a player at second base in the first round. 38 players were drafted out of high school, while 31 came from four-year college programs and two from junior colleges. They have also drafted two players from Puerto Rico: Alex Ríos (1999) and Miguel Negrón (2000).

Ed Sprague Jr. (1988), who was with the franchise when they won the World Series in 1992 and 1993, is the only pick to win a championship with the team. No picks have won the MLB Rookie of the Year Award, though Shawn Green (1991) and Alex Ríos (1999) finished fifth in the voting in 1995 and 2004, respectively. Roy Halladay (1995) is the only first-round pick of the Blue Jays to be inducted into the Baseball Hall of Fame, occurring in 2019, and to earn a Cy Young Award with the team, winning in 2003. Jay Schroeder (1979) was drafted as a catcher, but ended up becoming a quarterback for ten years in the National Football League.

The Blue Jays have made 23 selections in the supplemental round of the draft and 31 compensatory picks since their entry into the league in 1977. These additional picks are provided when a team loses a particularly valuable free agent in the previous off-season,^{[V]} or, more recently, if a team fails to sign a draft pick from the previous year. The Blue Jays have failed to sign three of their first-round picks, James Paxton (2009), who opted to return to the University of Kentucky, Tyler Beede (2011), and Phil Bickford (2013). The Blue Jays received the 38th pick in 2010, the 22nd pick in 2012, and the 11th pick in 2015 as compensation.

== Key ==
Year	Links to an article about that year's Major League Baseball draft
Position	Indicates the secondary/collegiate position at which the player was drafted, rather than the professional position the player may have gone on to play
Pick	Indicates the number of the pick
*	Player did not sign with the Blue Jays
§	Indicates a supplemental pick
†	Member of the National Baseball Hall of Fame
'92–'93	Player was a member of Blue Jays' 1992 and 1993 championship teams

== Picks ==
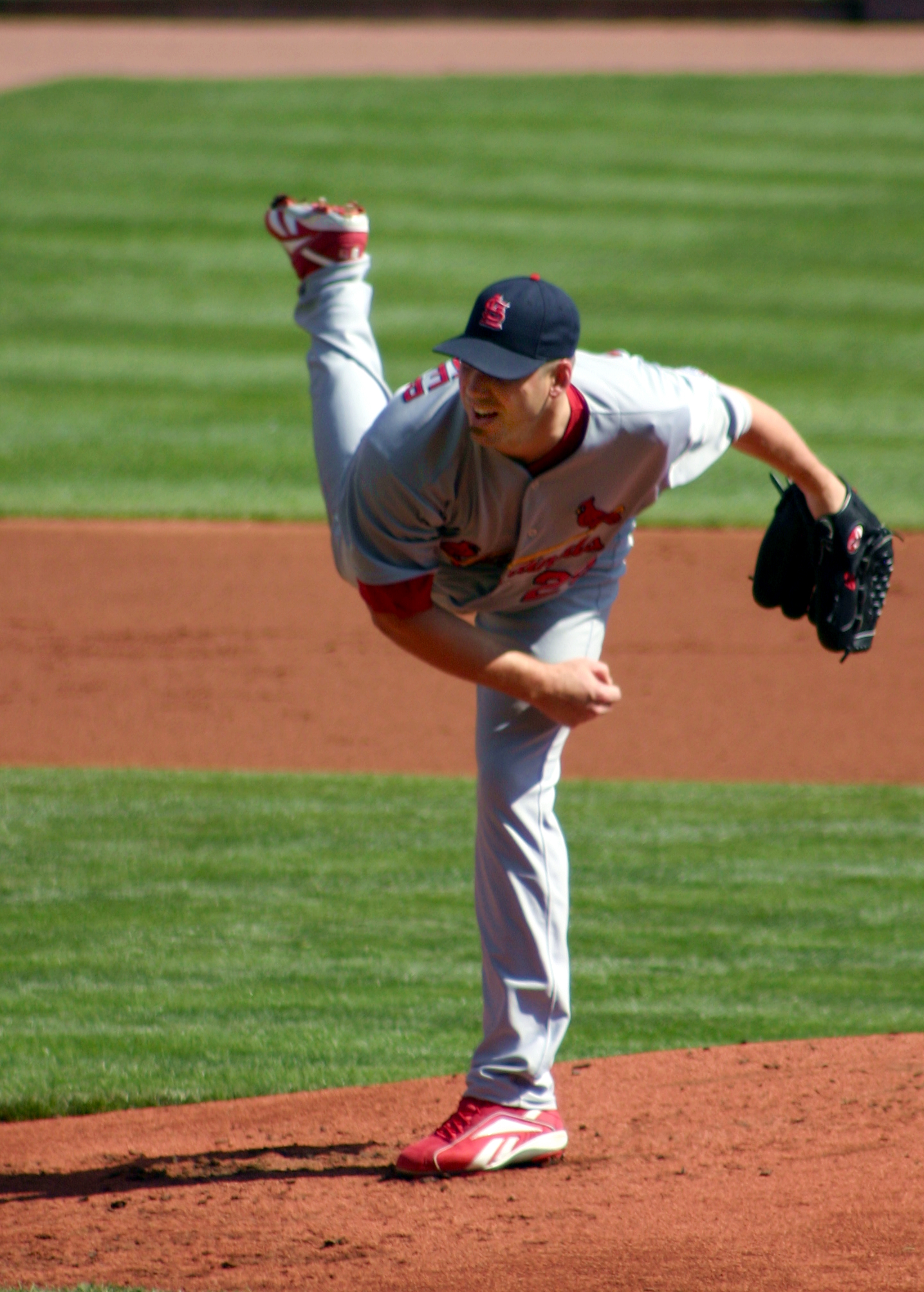
Chris Carpenter (1993), one of four players drafted in the first round of the 1993 draft, won a Cy Young Award with the St. Louis Cardinals.

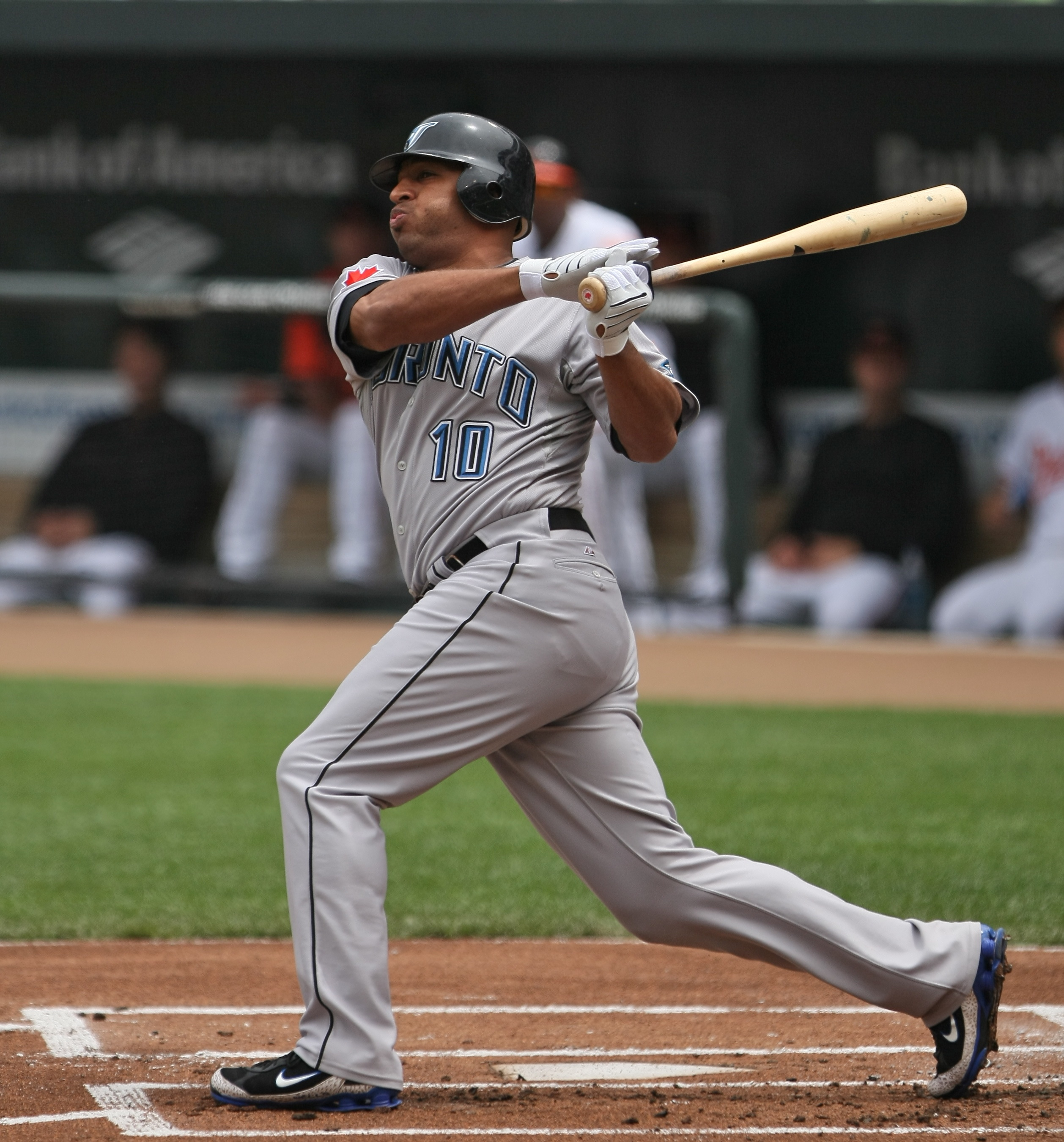
Vernon Wells (1997) is one of seven players drafted with the top five picks in the first round by the Blue Jays.

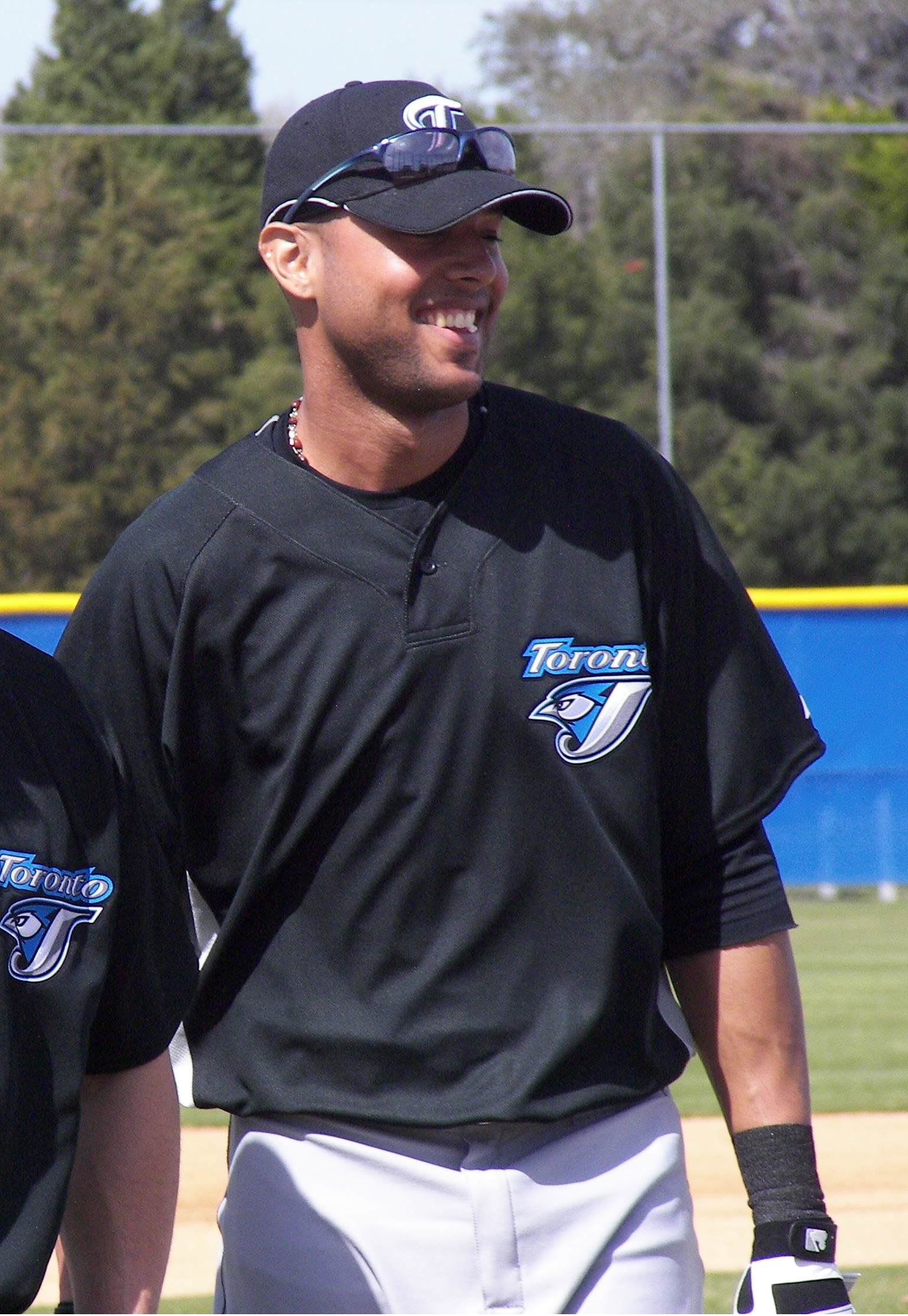
Alex Ríos (1999) is one of two players drafted by the Blue Jays from Puerto Rico.

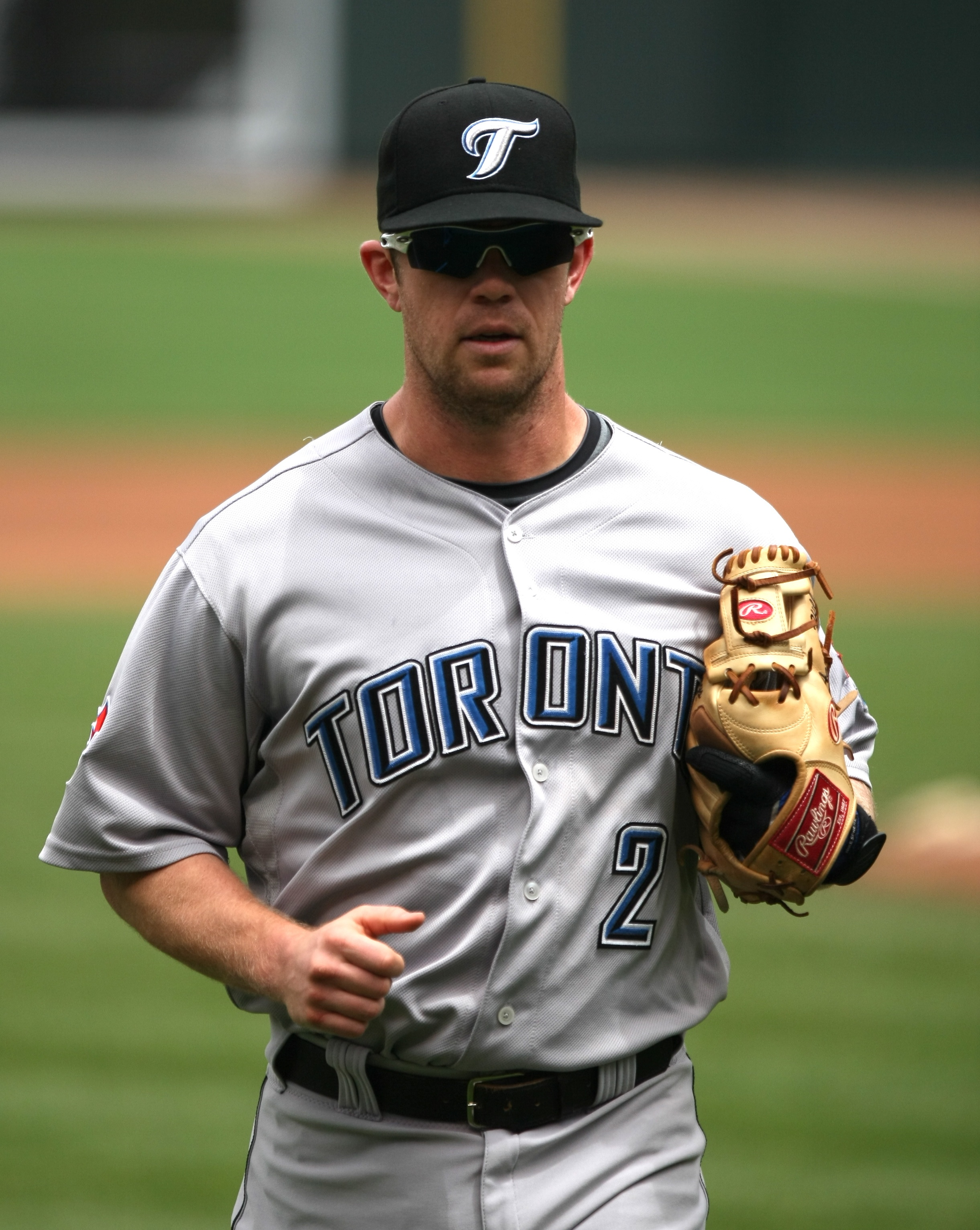
Aaron Hill (2003) was drafted as a shortstop, but was converted to second base and has played over 500 games with the Blue Jays at that position.

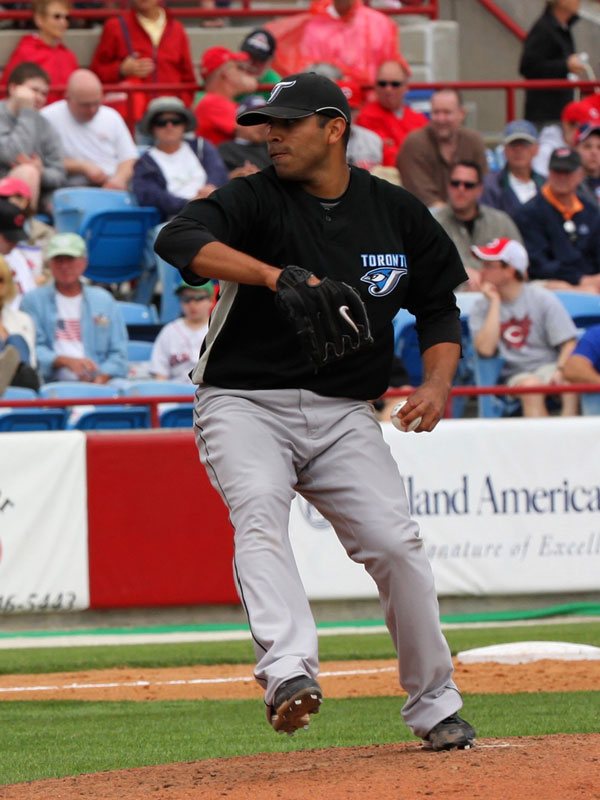
Ricky Romero (2005) is one of twelve players drafted from the state of California by the Blue Jays.

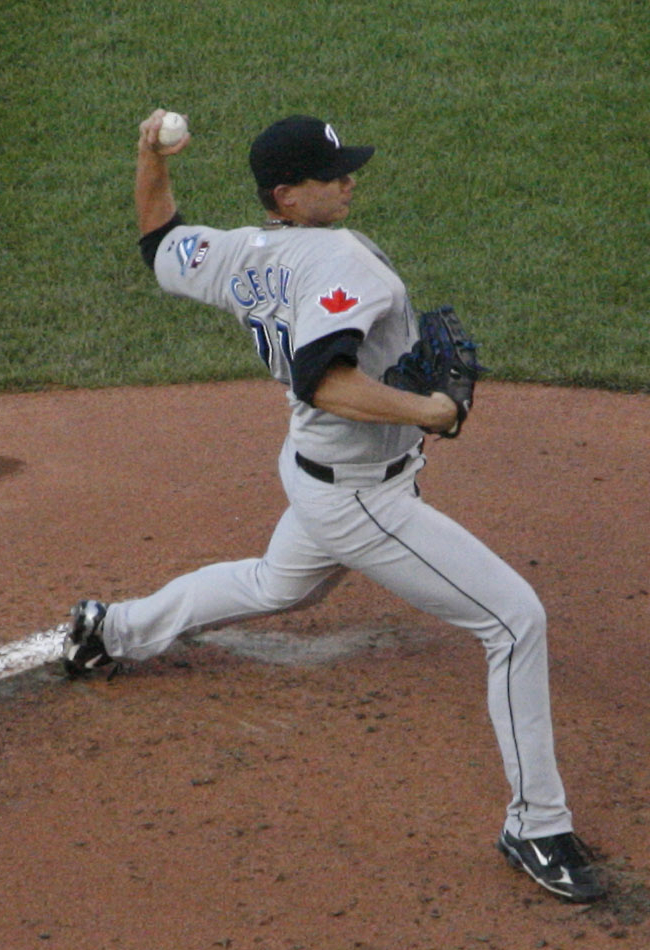
Brett Cecil (2007) is one of five players drafted by the Blue Jays in the first round of the 2007 draft.

Year	Name	Position	School (location)	Pick	Ref
1977	Tom Goffena	Shortstop	Sidney High School (Sidney, Ohio)	25	
1978	Lloyd Moseby	First baseman	Oakland High School (Oakland, California)	2	
1979	Jay Schroeder	Catcher	Palisades High School (Pacific Palisades, California)	3	
1980	Garry Harris	Shortstop	Hoover High School (San Diego, California)	2	
1981	Matt Williams	Right-handed pitcher	Rice University (Houston, Texas)	5	
1981	John Cerutti	Left-handed pitcher	Amherst College (Amherst, Massachusetts)	21^{[a]}	
1982	Augie Schmidt	Shortstop	University of New Orleans (New Orleans, Louisiana)	2	
1983	Matt Stark	Catcher	Los Altos High School (Hacienda Heights, California)	9	
1984	no first-round pick^{[b]}				
1985	Greg David	Outfielder	Barron G. Collier High School (Naples, Florida)	25	
1986	Earl Sanders	Right-handed pitcher	Jackson State University (Jackson, Mississippi)	26	
1987	Alex Sanchez	Right-handed pitcher	University of California, Los Angeles (Los Angeles, California)	13	
1988	Ed Sprague Jr. '92–'93	Third baseman	Stanford University (Stanford, California)	25	
1989	Eddie Zosky	Shortstop	California State University, Fresno (Fresno, California)	19	
1990	Steve Karsay	Right-handed pitcher	Christ The King Regional High School (Queens, New York)	22	
1991	Shawn Green	Outfielder	Tustin High School (Tustin, California)	16^{[c]}	
1991	Jeff Ware	Right-handed pitcher	Old Dominion University (Norfolk, Virginia)	35§^{[d]}	
1991	Dante Powell	Shortstop	Millikan High School (Long Beach, California)	42§^{[e]}	
1992	Shannon Stewart	Outfielder	Miami Southridge High School (Miami, Florida)	19^{[f]}	
1992	Todd Steverson	Outfielder	Arizona State University (Tempe, Arizona)	25	
1992	Brandon Cromer	Shortstop	Lexington High School (Lexington, South Carolina)	34§^{[g]}	
1993	Chris Carpenter	Right-handed pitcher	Trinity High School (Manchester, New Hampshire)	15^{[h]}	
1993	Matt Farner	Outfielder	East Pennsboro High School (Enola, Pennsylvania)	37§^{[i]}	
1993	Jeremy Lee	Right-handed pitcher	Galesburg High School (Galesburg, Illinois)	40§^{[j]}	
1993	Mark Lukasiewicz	Left-handed pitcher	Brevard Community College (Cocoa, Florida)	41§^{[k]}	
1994	Kevin Witt	Shortstop	Bishop Kenny High School (Jacksonville, Florida)	28	
1995	Roy Halladay^{†}	Right-handed pitcher	Arvada West High School (Arvada, Colorado)	17	
1996	Billy Koch	Right-handed pitcher	Clemson University (Clemson, South Carolina)	4	
1996	Joe Lawrence	Shortstop	Alfred M. Barbe High School (Lake Charles, Louisiana)	16^{[l]}	
1996	Pete Tucci	First baseman	Providence College (Providence, Rhode Island)	31§^{[m]}	
1997	Vernon Wells	Outfielder	Bowie High School (Arlington, Texas)	5	
1998	Felipe López	Third baseman	Lake Brantley High School (Altamonte Springs, Florida)	8	
1999	Alex Ríos	Outfielder	San Pedro Martin High School (Guaynabo, Puerto Rico)	19	
2000	Miguel Negrón	Outfielder	Manuela Toro High School (Caguas, Puerto Rico)	18	
2000	Dustin McGowan	Right-handed pitcher	Long County High School (Ludowici, Georgia)	33§^{[n]}	
2001	Gabe Gross	Outfielder	Auburn University (Auburn, Alabama)	15	
2002	Russ Adams	Shortstop	University of North Carolina at Chapel Hill (Chapel Hill, North Carolina)	14	
2003	Aaron Hill	Shortstop	Louisiana State University (Baton Rouge, Louisiana)	13	
2004	David Purcey	Left-handed pitcher	University of Oklahoma (Norman, Oklahoma)	16	
2004	Zach Jackson	Left-handed pitcher	Texas A&M University (College Station, Texas)	32§^{[o]}	
2005	Ricky Romero	Left-handed pitcher	California State University, Fullerton (Fullerton, California)	6	
2006	Travis Snider	Outfielder	Henry M. Jackson High School (Everett, Washington)	14	
2007	Kevin Ahrens	Shortstop	Memorial High School (Houston, Texas)	16^{[p]}	
2007	J. P. Arencibia	Catcher	University of Tennessee (Knoxville, Tennessee)	21	
2007	Brett Cecil	Left-handed pitcher	University of Maryland, College Park (College Park, Maryland)	38§^{[q]}	
2007	Justin Jackson	Shortstop	T. C. Roberson High School (Asheville, North Carolina)	45§^{[r]}	
2007	Trystan Magnuson	Right-handed pitcher	University of Louisville (Louisville, Kentucky)	56§^{[s]}	
2008	David Cooper	First baseman	University of California, Berkeley (Berkeley, California)	17	
2009	Chad Jenkins	Right-handed pitcher	Kennesaw State University (Kennesaw, Georgia)	20	
2009	James Paxton*	Left-handed pitcher	University of Kentucky (Lexington, Kentucky)	37§^{[t]}	
2010	Deck McGuire	Right-handed pitcher	Georgia Institute of Technology (Atlanta, Georgia)	11	
2010	Aaron Sanchez	Right-handed pitcher	Barstow High School (Barstow, California)	34§^{[u]}	
2010	Noah Syndergaard	Right-handed pitcher	Legacy High School (Mansfield, Texas)	38§^{[v]}	
2010	Asher Wojciechowski	Right-handed pitcher	The Citadel, The Military College of South Carolina (Charleston, South Carolina)	41§^{[w]}	
2011	Tyler Beede*	Right-handed pitcher	Lawrence Academy (Groton, Massachusetts)	21	
2011	Jacob Anderson	Outfielder	Chino High School (Chino, California)	35§^{[x]}	
2011	Joe Musgrove	Right-handed pitcher	Grossmont High School (San Diego, California)	46§^{[y]}	
2011	Dwight Smith Jr.	Outfielder	McIntosh High School (Peachtree City, Georgia)	53§^{[z]}	
2011	Kevin Comer	Right-handed pitcher	Seneca High School (Tabernacle Township, New Jersey)	57§^{[aa]}	
2012	D. J. Davis	Outfielder	Stone County High School (Wiggins, Mississippi)	17	
2012	Marcus Stroman	Right-handed pitcher	Duke University (Durham, North Carolina)	22^{[ab]}	
2012	Matt Smoral	Left-handed pitcher	Solon High School (Solon, Ohio)	50§^{[ac]}	
2012	Mitch Nay	Third baseman	Hamilton High School (Chandler, Arizona)	58§^{[ad]}	
2012	Tyler Gonzales	Right-handed pitcher	Madison High School (San Antonio, Texas)	60§^{[ae]}	
2013	Phil Bickford*	Right-handed pitcher	Oaks Christian School (Westlake Village, California)	10	
2014	Jeff Hoffman	Right-handed pitcher	East Carolina University (Greenville, North Carolina)	9	
2014	Max Pentecost	Catcher	Kennesaw State University (Kennesaw, Georgia)	11§^{[af]}	
2015	Jon Harris	Right-handed pitcher	Missouri State University (Springfield, Missouri)	29	
2016	T. J. Zeuch	Right-handed pitcher	University of Pittsburgh (Pittsburgh, Pennsylvania)	21	
2017	Logan Warmoth	Shortstop	University of North Carolina at Chapel Hill (Chapel Hill, North Carolina)	22	
2017	Nate Pearson	Right-handed pitcher	College of Central Florida (Ocala, Florida)	28§^{[ag]}	
2018	Jordan Groshans	Shortstop	Magnolia High School (Magnolia, Texas)	12	
2019	Alek Manoah	Right-handed pitcher	West Virginia University (Morgantown, West Virginia)	11	
2020	Austin Martin	Shortstop	Vanderbilt University (Nashville, Tennessee)	5	
2021	Gunnar Hoglund	Right-handed pitcher	University of Mississippi (Oxford, Mississippi)	19	
2022	Brandon Barriera	Left-handed pitcher	American Heritage Schools (Plantation, Florida)	23	
2023	Arjun Nimmala	Shortstop	Strawberry Crest High School (Dover, Florida)	20	
2024	Trey Yesavage	Right-handed Pitcher	East Carolina University (Greenville, North Carolina)	20	
2025	JoJo Parker	Shortstop	Purvis High School (Purvis, Mississippi)	8	
2026	Cole Carlon	Pitcher	Arizona State (Tempe, Arizona)	39^{[ah]}	

== See also ==
- Toronto Blue Jays minor league players

== Footnotes ==
- ^{V} Through the 2012 draft, free agents were evaluated by the Elias Sports Bureau and rated "Type A", "Type B", or not compensation-eligible. If a team offered arbitration to a player but that player refused and subsequently signed with another team, the original team was able to receive additional draft picks. If a "Type A" free agent left in this way, his previous team received a supplemental pick and a compensatory pick from the team with which he signed. If a "Type B" free agent left in this way, his previous team received only a supplemental pick. Since the 2013 draft, free agents are no longer classified by type; instead, compensatory picks are only awarded if the team offered its free agent a contract worth at least the average of the 125 current richest MLB contracts. However, if the free agent's last team acquired the player in a trade during the last year of his contract, it is ineligible to receive compensatory picks for that player.
- ^{a} The Blue Jays gained a compensatory first-round pick in 1981 from the Milwaukee Brewers for losing free agent Roy Howell.
- ^{b} The Blue Jays lost their first-round pick in 1984 to the Chicago White Sox as compensation for signing free agent Dennis Lamp.
- ^{c} The Blue Jays gained a compensatory first-round pick in 1991 from the San Francisco Giants for losing free agent Bud Black.
- ^{d} The Blue Jays gained a supplemental first-round pick in 1991 for losing free agent George Bell.
- ^{e} The Blue Jays gained a supplemental first-round pick in 1991 for losing free agent Bud Black.
- ^{f} The Blue Jays gained a compensatory first-round pick in 1992 from the Los Angeles Dodgers for losing free agent Tom Candiotti.
- ^{g} The Blue Jays gained a supplemental first-round pick in 1992 for losing free agent Tom Candiotti.
- ^{h} The Blue Jays gained a compensatory first-round pick in 1993 from the Texas Rangers for losing free agent Tom Henke.
- ^{i} The Blue Jays gained a supplemental first-round pick in 1993 for losing free agent David Cone.
- ^{j} The Blue Jays gained a supplemental first-round pick in 1993 for losing free agent Tom Henke.
- ^{k} The Blue Jays gained a supplemental first-round pick in 1993 for losing free agent Jimmy Key.
- ^{l} The Blue Jays gained a compensatory first-round pick in 1996 from the Baltimore Orioles for losing free agent Roberto Alomar.
- ^{m} The Blue Jays gained a supplemental first-round pick in 1996 for losing free agent Roberto Alomar.
- ^{n} The Blue Jays gained a supplemental first-round pick in 2000 for losing free agent Graeme Lloyd.
- ^{o} The Blue Jays gained a supplemental first-round pick in 2004 for losing free agent Kelvim Escobar.
- ^{p} The Blue Jays gained a compensatory first-round pick in 2007 from the Texas Rangers for losing free agent Frank Catalanotto.
- ^{q} The Blue Jays gained a supplemental first-round pick in 2007 for losing free agent Justin Speier.
- ^{r} The Blue Jays gained a supplemental first-round pick in 2007 for losing free agent Frank Catalanotto.
- ^{s} The Blue Jays gained a supplemental first-round pick in 2007 for losing free agent Ted Lilly.
- ^{t} The Blue Jays gained a supplemental first-round pick in 2009 for losing free agent A. J. Burnett.
- ^{u} The Blue Jays gained a supplemental first-round pick in 2010 for losing free agent Marco Scutaro.
- ^{v} The Blue Jays gained a supplemental first-round pick in 2010 for failing to sign draft pick James Paxton.
- ^{w} The Blue Jays gained a supplemental first-round pick in 2010 for losing free agent Rod Barajas.
- ^{x} The Blue Jays gained a supplemental first-round pick in 2011 for losing free agent Scott Downs.
- ^{y} The Blue Jays gained a supplemental first-round pick in 2011 for losing free agent John Buck.
- ^{z} The Blue Jays gained a supplemental first-round pick in 2011 for losing free agent Kevin Gregg.
- ^{aa} The Blue Jays gained a supplemental first-round pick in 2011 for losing free agent Miguel Olivo.
- ^{ab} The Blue Jays gained a compensatory first-round pick in 2012 for failing to sign draft pick Tyler Beede.
- ^{ac} The Blue Jays gained a supplemental first-round pick in 2012 for losing free agent Frank Francisco.
- ^{ad} The Blue Jays gained a supplemental first-round pick in 2012 for losing free agent Jon Rauch.
- ^{ae} The Blue Jays gained a supplemental first-round pick in 2012 for losing free agent José Molina.
- ^{af} The Blue Jays gained a compensatory first-round pick in 2014 for failing to sign draft pick Phil Bickford.
- ^{ag} The Blue Jays gained a supplemental first-round pick in 2017 for losing free agent Edwin Encarnación.
