= Justin Evans =

Justin Evans may refer to:

- Justin Evans (soccer) (born 1977)
- Justin Evans (American football) (born 1995)
