= D. J. Davis =

D. J. Davis may refer to:

- D. J. Davis (baseball) (born 1994), baseball player
- Drew Davis (American football) (born 1989), also known as D. J. Davis, American football player
