= Kennesaw State Owls =

College athletics program of Kennesaw State University

- University: Kennesaw State University
- Conference: Conference USA
- NCAA: Division I (FBS)
- Athletic director: Milton Overton
- Location: Kennesaw, Georgia
- Varsity teams: 18 (8 men's, 10 women's)
- Football stadium: Fifth Third Bank Stadium
- Basketball arena: KSU Convocation Center
- Baseball stadium: Stillwell Baseball Stadium
- Softball stadium: Bailey Park
- Soccer stadium: Fifth Third Bank Stadium
- Lacrosse stadium: Fifth Third Bank Stadium
- Tennis venue: Betty Siegel Courts
- Mascot: Scrappy the Owl
- Nickname: Owls
- Fight song: The KSU Fight Song
- Colors: Black and gold
- Website: ksuowls.com
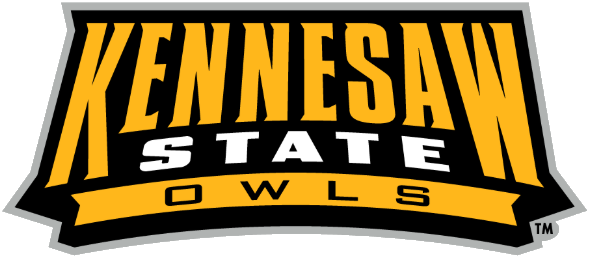

Team NCAA championships
- 5

The Kennesaw State Owls fields 16 varsity athletics teams, competing for Kennesaw State University. After spending ten years in Division II's Peach Belt Conference, the university fully transitioned to Division I status in the National Collegiate Athletic Association at the beginning of the 2009–10 season. All of Kennesaw State's sports teams competed in the Atlantic Sun Conference through the 2023–24 school year, except that football competed as an FCS independent in the 2023 season only. In July 2023, KSU started a transition to the Football Bowl Subdivision in advance of its move to Conference USA, which happened in 2024. Of its 18 varsity sports, only women's lacrosse is not sponsored by CUSA. The school mascot is Scrappy the Owl.

Kennesaw State's athletic department was founded in 1983, and initially offered nine sports: women's basketball, men's soccer, men's & women's cross country, and men's & women's track and field. The program first began competition in the Georgia Intercollegiate Athletic Conference, part of the NAIA. In just 23 years, the school has transitioned to a full NCAA Division I program.

== Conference affiliations ==
=== NAIA ===
The Owls have been affiliated to one athletic conference in their tenure within the NAIA, which is:

- NAIA Independent (1982–1983)
- Georgia Intercollegiate Athletic Conference (Note: During the 1993–94 school year, the Owls began competing for select sports (either with or without a conference schedule) as a provisional member of the NCAA Division II Peach Belt Conference (PBC); with full PBC competition that began on fall 1994.) (1983–1994)

=== NCAA ===
Conference USA logo in Kennesaw State's colors

Since joining the NCAA, the Owls have been affiliated to three athletic conferences in their history, they are:

- Peach Belt Conference (Note: During the 1993–94 school year, the Owls joined the PBC as a provisional member with full competition within conference play that began on fall 1994; while they were finishing their final season in the NAIA and the GCAC.) (1994–2005)
- Atlantic Sun Conference (2005–2024)
- Conference USA (2024–present)

== Sports sponsored ==
| Men's sports | Women's sports |
|---|---|
| Baseball | Basketball |
| Basketball | Cross country |
| Cross country | Golf |
| Football | Lacrosse |
| Golf | Soccer |
| Tennis | Softball |
| Track and field^{1} | Tennis |
| | Track and field^{1} |
| | Volleyball |
^{1} – includes both indoor and outdoor

=== Baseball ===
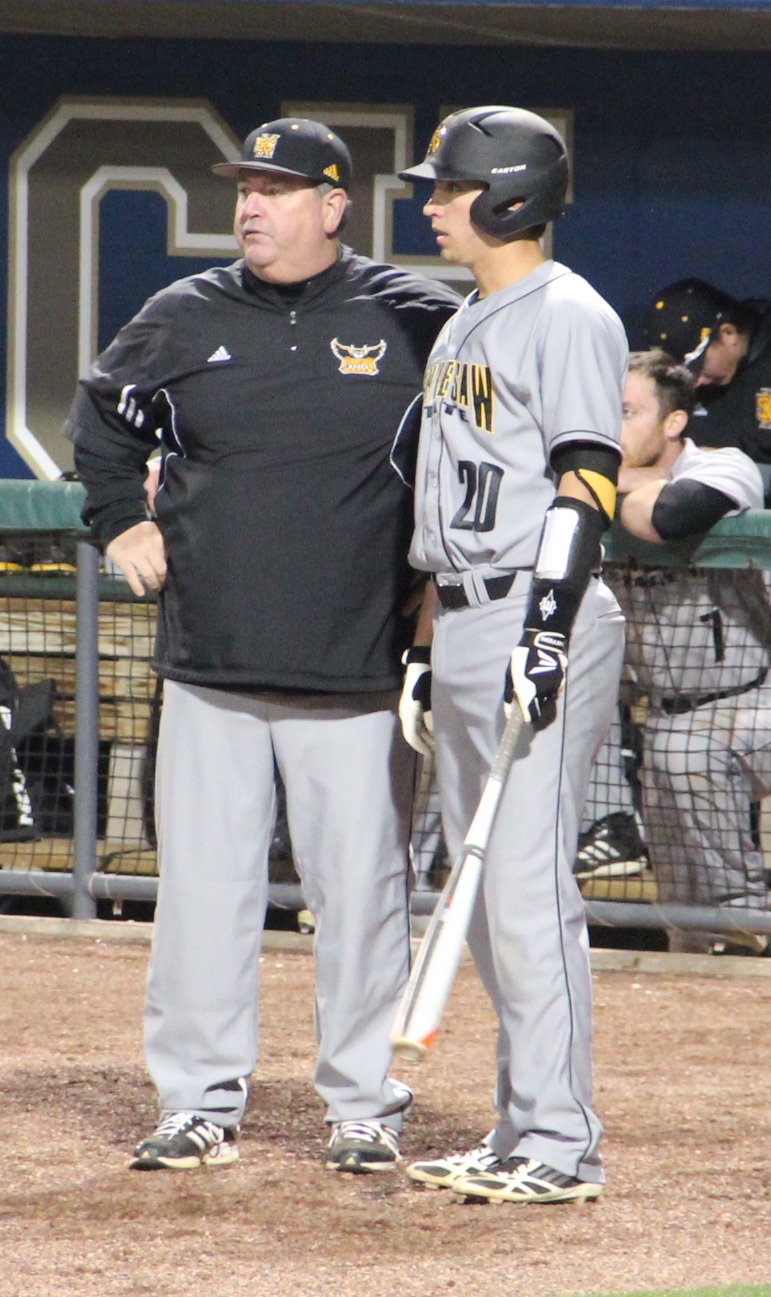
Coach Mike Sansing with an Owls baseball player in 2014

In their short history, the Owls have had 32 players who have been drafted by MLB teams. Five of their alumni have reached the Major Leagues, including Jason Jones of the Texas Rangers, Chad Jenkins of the Toronto Blue Jays, Brett Campbell of the Washington Nationals, and Willie Harris, who earned a World Series ring with the Chicago White Sox in 2005, of the Cincinnati Reds. In 2014, Max Pentecost won the Johnny Bench Award as the best catcher in NCAA's Division I.

In 2009, six Kennesaw State players were selected in the MLB draft. Chad Jenkins was selected by the Toronto Blue Jays with their first round pick (20th overall). Kyle Heckathorn was selected by the Milwaukee Brewers with their supplemental first round pick at 47th overall. Jace Whitmer (Oakland Athletics), Kenny Faulk (Detroit Tigers), Tyler Stubblefield (Atlanta Braves), and Justin Edwards (Cincinnati Reds) were also selected by MLB teams.

==== NAIA era (1984–1994) ====
Kennesaw State's baseball team began play in 1984 as an NAIA program. Jim Nash was the team's first head coach, and led them to a 30–20 record. In 1985, the Owls hired John Barrett to act as head coach. In his only year, he took the team all the way to the NAIA District 25 Tournament with a 31–24 record. The following year, the Owls again hired a new coach, this time tabbing Chip Reese to lead the way. Coach Reese was with the Owls for 5 seasons (1986–1990). During his tenure with the Owls, they competed in the NAIA District 25 Tournament four times, and carried an overall record of 145–126–2. Steve Givens was the next Owls head coach in 1991, and in his only season the team went 35–25 and made yet another appearance in the NAIA District 25 Tournament. Starting in 1992, the Owls gained some head coaching stability with the hiring of Mike Sansing. The Owls experienced an immediate improvement when Sansing was hired, and finished the 1992 season with a record of 39–19, and an appearance in the NAIA Tournament. The first major success for the program came in 1994, when the Owls completed the regular season with a then school-high record of 48 wins. They then proceeded to go undefeated throughout the entire postseason (12–0), beating Southeastern Oklahoma State University in the NAIA World Series final.

| Year | Wins | Losses | Winning Percentage |
|---|---|---|---|
| 1984 | 30 | 20 | .600 |
| 1985 | 31 | 24 | .564 |
| 1986 | 18 | 30 | .375 |
| 1987 | 23 | 29 | .442 |
| 1988 | 34 | 25 | .576 |
| 1989 | 33 | 21 | .611 |
| 1990 | 37 | 21 | .638 |
| 1991 | 33 | 25 | .569 |
| 1992 | 39 | 19 | .672 |
| 1993 | 36 | 16 | .692 |
| 1994 | 48 | 14 | .774 |
| Overall | 362 | 244 | .597 |

==== Division II era (1995–2005) ====
In the year following their NAIA Championship, the Owls moved up to Division II, and joined the Peach Belt Conference. The Owls adjusted to the competition, and won their conference with a 19–4 record (43–14 overall). The Owls also made it to the NCAA South Atlantic Regional after winning the Peach Belt Tournament with a 5–0 record. After their success in 1995, they followed it in 1996. Instead of getting stalled during the NCAA South Atlantic Regional again, the Owls beat Columbus State three game to one, and moved on to the NCAA Division II World Series in Montgomery, Alabama. During the World Series, Kennesaw State defeated Southern Colorado 9–3, Adelphi 8–7, Delta State 3–1, and finally, defeated St. Joseph's 4–0 in the championship game. Following their 1996 National Championship, Kennesaw had additional postseason appearances from 1997 to 2005. From 1997 to 1999, the Owls made three straight appearances in the Division II World Series, losing each time in the finals or semi-finals. During the 2000–2005 seasons, Kennesaw State racked up 238–112 record, and made the postseason five more times, with an appearance in the Division II World Series in 2003.

| Year | Wins | Losses | Winning Percentage |
|---|---|---|---|
| 1995 | 43 | 14 | .754 |
| 1996 | 48 | 17 | .738 |
| 1997 | 48 | 14 | .774 |
| 1998 | 61 | 5 | .924 |
| 1999 | 49 | 14 | .778 |
| 2000 | 38 | 20 | .655 |
| 2001 | 45 | 15 | .750 |
| 2002 | 48 | 13 | .787 |
| 2003 | 40 | 18 | .690 |
| 2004 | 32 | 24 | .571 |
| 2005 | 37 | 22 | .627 |
| Overall | 489 | 176 | .735 |

==== Division I era (2006–present) ====
The program transitioned to Division I in 2006. They began play in the Atlantic Sun Conference, and during the mandatory four-year reclassification period, the Owls notched 116 wins, two second place conference finishes and had eight players selected in the Major League Baseball Draft. In the 2011 campaign, the Owls had a big win when they defeated No. 8 Georgia Tech at Stillwell Stadium in front of 1,142 fans. In 2012, the Owls had their most successful postseason campaign in Division I, making it all the way to the A-Sun Championship game against Belmont where they lost 10–4. In the 2013 season, the Owls made it to the Atlantic Sun Championship again and were defeated by East Tennessee State 7–2.

The 2014 season has been the best season for KSU baseball, by far. The Owls won their first A-Sun Championship in 2014 by beating Lipscomb 7–1. They then proceeded to their first NCAA Regional and won in Tallahassee. The Owls moved on to the Super Regional, but lost to Louisville in two games.

| Year | Wins | Losses | Winning Percentage | Notes |
|---|---|---|---|---|
| 2006 | 24 | 32 | .429 | |
| 2007 | 32 | 23 | .582 | |
| 2008 | 30 | 26 | .536 | |
| 2009 | 30 | 22 | .577 | |
| 2010 | 23 | 32 | .418 | |
| 2011 | 32 | 15 | .681 | |
| 2012 | 34 | 25 | .576 | |
| 2013 | 30 | 30 | .500 | |
| 2014 | 40 | 24 | .625 | 2014 ASUN Conference Champions |
| 2015 | 28 | 28 | .500 | |
| 2016 | 29 | 27 | .518 | |
| 2017 | 25 | 32 | .439 | |
| 2018 | 25 | 30 | .455 | |
| 2019 | 27 | 29 | .482 | |
| 2020 | 10 | 8 | .556 | Season canceled on March 12 due to Coronavirus pandemic |
| 2021 | 29 | 22 | .569 | |
| 2022 | 36 | 28 | .563 | 2022 ASUN Conference Champions |
| Overall | 455 | 421 | .519 | |

=== Men's basketball ===
==== NAIA era (1985–86 to 1993–94) ====
Beginning in the 1985–86 season, the Kennesaw State Owls basketball teams began play as an NAIA team, competing in the GIAC conference. The Owls were led by head coach Phil Zenoni during their tenure in NAIA, where they compiled a 145–122 record.

| Season | Wins | Losses | Winning Percentage |
|---|---|---|---|
| 1985–86 | 7 | 21 | .250 |
| 1986–87 | 14 | 16 | .467 |
| 1987–88 | 14 | 16 | .467 |
| 1988–89 | 17 | 14 | .548 |
| 1989–90 | 15 | 13 | .536 |
| 1990–91 | 18 | 11 | .621 |
| 1991–92 | 21 | 10 | .677 |
| 1992–93 | 19 | 12 | .613 |
| 1993–94 | 20 | 9 | .690 |
| Overall | 145 | 122 | .543 |

==== Division II era (1994–95 to 2004–05) ====
| Season | Wins | Losses | Winning Percentage |
|---|---|---|---|
| 1994–95 | 8 | 19 | .296 |
| 1995–96 | 12 | 15 | .444 |
| 1996–97 | 20 | 7 | .741 |
| 1997–98 | 19 | 10 | .655 |
| 1998–99 | 10 | 17 | .370 |
| 1999–00 | 14 | 11 | .560 |
| 2000–01 | 11 | 15 | .423 |
| 2001–02 | 20 | 10 | .667 |
| 2002–03 | 25 | 10 | .714 |
| 2003–04 | 35 | 4 | .897 |
| 2004–05 | 24 | 6 | .800 |
| Overall | 198 | 124 | .615 |

==== Division I era (2005–06 to present) ====
The Kennesaw State Owls basketball teams currently play NCAA Division I basketball in the Atlantic Sun Conference. The team was formed in the Convocation Center on the campus of KSU. The teams previously played in the Spec Landrum Center, which served as the home floor when the men won the NCAA Division II National Championship in 2004.

On April 20, 2011, Kennesaw State University officials named Lewis Preston as the Owls' new men's basketball Head Coach.

Preston took a leave of absence in January 2014, citing personal and medical reasons. Preston was replaced by Jimmy Lallathin on an interim basis for the remainder of the 2013–14 season. In March 2014, Lallathin was promoted to permanent head coach. After going 10–22 in his only season in charge of the program, Lallathin was reassigned within the athletics department and eventually removed as head coach as the result of an internal investigation.

On April 26, 2015, Kennesaw State reached an agreement with former National Coach of the Year and Boston College head man, Al Skinner to be their sixth head coach in program history. Skinner led the Owls to an 11–20 record in his first season but went 7–7 in conference for the first .500 conference record in Kennesaw State Division I history.

On February 21, 2019, Skinner announced his resignation from Kennesaw State effective at the end of the season. He was replaced at the start of the 2019–20 season by Amir Abdur-Rahim. After a difficult first season, Abdur-Rahim eventually led Kennesaw to win the 2023 ASUN Conference tournament and a 14 seed in the NCAA tournament.

| Season | Wins | Losses | Winning Percentage | Conference record |
|---|---|---|---|---|
| 2005–06 | 12 | 17 | .414 | |
| 2006–07 | 13 | 18 | .419 | 10–8 |
| 2007–08 | 10 | 20 | .333 | 7–7 |
| 2008–09 | 7 | 22 | .241 | 2–16 |
| 2009–10 | 13 | 20 | .394 | 7–13 |
| 2010–11 | 8 | 23 | .258 | 6–14 |
| 2011–12 | 3 | 28 | .097 | 0–18 |
| 2012–13 | 3 | 27 | .111 | 2–16 |
| 2013–14 | 6 | 25 | .194 | 3–15 |
| 2014–15 | 10 | 22 | .312 | 4–10 |
| 2015–16 | 11 | 20 | .355 | 7–7 |
| 2016–17 | 14 | 18 | .438 | 7–7 |
| 2017–18 | 10 | 20 | .333 | 6–8 |
| 2018–19 | 6 | 26 | .188 | 3–13 |
| 2019–20 | 1 | 28 | .034 | 0–16 |
| 2020–21 | 5 | 19 | .208 | 2–13 |
| 2021–22 | 13 | 18 | .419 | 7–9 |
| 2022–23 | 26 | 9 | .743 | 15–3 |
| Overall | 145 | 371 | .281 | |

=== Women's basketball ===
The Kennesaw State Owls women's basketball team is led by second-year head coach and former Miami Hurricane Octavia Blue.

| Season | Wins | Losses | Winning Percentage |
|---|---|---|---|
| 2005–06 | 5 | 22 | .185 |
| 2006–07 | 13 | 16 | .448 |
| 2007–08 | 16 | 12 | .571 |
| 2008–09 | 15 | 14 | .517 |
| 2009–10 | 11 | 19 | .367 |
| 2010–11 | 9 | 21 | .300 |
| 2011–12 | 14 | 17 | .452 |
| 2012–13 | 7 | 24 | .226 |
| 2013–14 | 6 | 24 | .200 |
| 2014–15 | 17 | 13 | .567 |
| 2015–16 | 11 | 19 | .367 |
| 2016–17 | 10 | 20 | .333 |
| 2017–18 | 7 | 19 | .269 |
| 2018–19 | 9 | 22 | .290 |
| 2019–20 | 13 | 16 | .448 |
| 2020–21 | 7 | 12 | .368 |
| 2021–22 | 9 | 19 | .321 |
| Overall | 179 | 309 | .367 |

=== Cross country ===
Kennesaw State's men's cross country team is currently coached by David Poteet. In the 2009 season, the Owls finished first in five of their eight meets, including a first-place finish in their conference at the A-Sun Cross Country Championship. The men ended the 2009 season finishing eighth at the NCAA South Region Championship. The women's team finished first in four of their seven meets in the 2009 season. The women finished second in their conference at the A-Sun Cross Country Championship. The Cross Country team was also featured in an article of the September, 2010 issue of Running Times magazine.

In the 2010 season, the team made it, for the second straight year since being eligible for postseason competition, to the NCAA South Regional where they finished ninth.

=== Golf ===
The Kennesaw State men's golf team opened its fall season in 2011 with the first round of the Carpet Capital Collegiate Classic to finish in 12th place.

=== Soccer ===
Kennesaw State started women's soccer in 2002. In their first year of competition the school finished 18–0–1 and earned a trip to the national tournament. The following year Kennesaw State won the Division II National Championship. 2004 was the start of the transition to Division I and during the 2006 season, the Owls won the Atlantic Sun Conference regular season title. After winning their second straight A-Sun title in 2007, the Owls made their first appearance in the NCAA Women's Soccer Championships, falling to Florida State, 3–0, in the first round.

On November 5, 2009, the KSU Owls defeated Jacksonville in overtime. This win put the Owls in the finals versus Belmont on November 7, 2009. In the finals, Jade Dempster found the net with a penalty-kick goal in the 87th minute lifting Kennesaw State to its second Atlantic Sun Women's Soccer Championship in three seasons with a 2–1 victory against Belmont. The Owls earn the conference's automatic bid to the 2009 NCAA tournament.

The Owls opened a new home in 2010. KSU and the Atlanta Beat of Women's Professional Soccer entered into a public-private partnership to build the new Kennesaw State University Soccer Stadium, now known as Fifth Third Bank Stadium, near the KSU campus. The facility, which opened on May 2, 2010, has been home to the Owls ever since. The Beat played there until WPS folded after its 2011 season. The stadium became home to Atlanta United 2, the reserve side for Major League Soccer's Atlanta United FC, in 2019. The stadium was host to the 2011 NCAA Women's College Cup.

=== Softball ===
==== NAIA era (1983–1994) ====
The softball program was founded in the fall of 1983 by Gary Wiseman, with the intent to compete in both slowpitch and fastpitch. The program instead began as slowpitch only, and lasted that way until 1990.

The Lady Owls began intercollegiate softball in 1985, with head coach Medra Ashmore leading the way. She led the Owls to a 75–24 record in her two-year tenure, and also captured the NAIA District 25 Championship in 1986.

In 1987, Scott Whitlock, a man who would become one of the all-time winningest coaches in NCAA history, began coaching the Lady Owls. In his first year with the Owls, Whitlock guided the team to a 36–5 record, and captured the Georgia Conference Championship. Whitlock had much of the same success in NAIA competition in 1989 and 1990 as well, leading the Owls to a 40–4 record in 1989 (winning the Georgia Conference Championship for the second year in a row), and a 33–2 record in 1990, where they captured their second NAIA District 25 Championship.

Following the 1990 season, the Owls made a seamless transition from competing in slowpitch to fastpitch. They went on to a 41–11 record in 1991 and made an appearance in the NAIA World Series that year. The following three years (1992–1994), the Owls dominated their conference again, with records of 46–8 (1992), 41–6 (1993), and 48–4 (1994). In their four years as a fastpitch NAIA program, the Owls appeared in the NAIA National Tournament every year, and also won the NAIA Tri-District 10 Tournament all four years as well.

The team joined the Peach Belt Conference in 1993, but did not keep a conference record and still competed in the NAIA postseason in the 1993–94 season.

==== NCAA Division II era (1995–2005) ====
In 1995, the Lady Owls jumped from NAIA to NCAA Division II, where they competed in the Peach Belt Conference. In their first year of competition at the Division II level, the Owls posted a 53–5 record, en route to winning the National Championship. They followed this performance in 1996, going 49–8, and won another National Championship.

From 1997 to 2005, the Owls made seven more appearances in the NCAA Division II World Series (1997, 1999, 2000, 2001, 2002, 2004, 2005) and finishing as the runner up in 2000.

==== NCAA Division I era (2006–present) ====
With all of their success in Division II, the Owls moved up to the NCAA's highest classification starting with the 2006 season and began competing in the Atlantic Sun Conference.

In their first year of Division I play, the Owls went 38–17 and tied for second in the Atlantic Sun. The following year (2007), they went 44–20 and captured the regular season Atlantic Sun Championship.

From 2008 to 2011, the Owls have combined to go 112–100, and have produced a winning record in every season except 2009.

| Level | Wins | Losses | Winning Percentage |
|---|---|---|---|
| Slow Pitch | 228 | 39 | .854 |
| NAIA | 176 | 29 | .859 |
| Division II | 559 | 82 | .872 |
| Division I | 194 | 135 | .590 |
| Overall | 1157 | 285 | .802 |

=== Track and field ===
The Kennesaw State track men's track team won the Indoor & Outdoor Conference Championships in 2008 and 2010. Formerly an assistant for Kansas State, Andy Eggerth was named the new head coach of Kennesaw State Track and Field in fall of 2010 and was named A-Sun Coach of the Year for 2011.

=== Volleyball ===
In the 2010 season, the volleyball team won nine out of ten Atlantic Sun Conference matches, finished in second in the A-Sun, and had four student-athletes receive All-Conference Honors. Head Coach Karen Weatherington was named A-Sun Coach of the Year. The Owls flew into the A-Sun Championships, where a bye moved the Owls into the semifinals for the first time in program history.

=== Lacrosse ===
Kennesaw State University President Daniel S. Papp and KSU Director of Athletics Vaughn Williams announced the addition of women's lacrosse as the university's 17th NCAA Division I championship sport, with intercollegiate competition beginning in the spring of 2013.

The Kennesaw State Owls women's lacrosse program will compete in the Atlantic Sun Conference, which will be sponsoring the sport for the first time beginning in 2013. The Owls have been members of the conference since the fall of 2005, with all 16 of Kennesaw State's existing varsity sports competing for A-Sun championships.

The addition of women's lacrosse at KSU fulfills a commitment made to the Atlantic Sun Conference when Kennesaw State joined the A-Sun in 2005, at which time KSU officials agreed to add a new sport to the Athletic Department's offerings. At the university's request, the A-Sun has granted KSU several delays, however now it is time for the university to begin launching the new sport.

=== Football ===
Kennesaw State has considered adding a football team at various points in its history. Future plans for the school include a football stadium. The school has concluded a feasibility survey which affirmed it would be possible to have Division I football. On November 9, 2007, a survey was administered by Student Government with 77.6 percent of respondents voting in favor of starting a football program. Participation in the survey was supposed to be restricted to enrolled students only; however, due to a design flaw, anyone could take the survey an unlimited number of times.

Kennesaw State convened a football committee in late 2009, consisting of students, faculty, staff, alumni, business and community leaders, as well as friends and benefactors of KSU. The group, led by former University of Georgia football coach and athletic director Vince Dooley, provided a final report of its recommendations to KSU President Daniel Papp in September 2010.

The results of the report were released in a September 15, 2010 press conference, featuring Papp and Dooley, at the KSU Convocation Center. It was announced that the school would plan to launch a football program at the FCS level in 2014, with the team playing home games at KSU Soccer Stadium.

As of July 1, 2015, the KSU football program competed as members of the Big South Conference since the ASUN did not sponsor football at the time; under the terms of an alliance between the two conferences, football-playing members of the ASUN played as Big South members.

The ASUN technically began sponsoring football in 2021, entering into a separate partnership with the Western Athletic Conference (WAC), which had reinstated football at the FCS level in that season. The ASUN–Big South partnership ended when the ASUN launched its own football league in the 2022 season, with KSU as one of its six charter members. The partnership with the WAC remains in place, with playoff-eligible members of both conferences competing for a single automatic berth in the FCS playoffs.

==== The start – 2015 season ====
The Program began playing games in the fall of 2015, with a 56–16 win against East Tennessee State. The Owls finished the season 6–5 (2–4 in the Big South).

==== Early success – 2017 and 2018 ====
In the program's fourth year of existence (third season played, as the 2014 season was practice only and every player took a red shirt) the Owls won the 2017 Big South Championship, going 5–0 in conference play. Kennesaw State received the conference's automatic bid to the FCS playoffs in both those seasons, in 2017 as an unseeded team the Owls hosted Samford in a rematch of the season opener, Kennesaw avenged the early season loss and went on the next week to upset the third-ranked Jacksonville State Gamecocks. At the time that was by far the best win in program history. After the huge win the Owls traveled to sixth-ranked Sam Houston State for the quarterfinals, the Owls dropped the game 34–27, but had a huge swing of momentum heading into the 2018 season. Kennesaw State finished the season ranked eighth in the FCS STATS Poll (highest media poll in the FCS) and 9th in the Coach's Poll.

The 2018 season saw The Owls open at fifth in both polls, the highest in program history. Kennesaw lost its third straight season opener, a tough road loss to nearby Georgia State. It was the program's first game against an FBS team and ended with a 24–20 loss at Georgia State Stadium. After the hiccup the Owls did not look back, winning 11 games in a row. After a 56–17 road win against Gardner-Webb, Kennesaw was voted to the Number 2 spot in both the FCS STATS and Coach's Polls, behind only North Dakota State. Just like 2017, Kennesaw finished 5–0 in the Big South winning a second consecutive conference championship. That made the Owls the first team to win the conference outright in back to back season since former member Liberty did so in 2007 and 2008. The regular season was completed with an instant classic against Jacksonville State at SunTrust Park. A five overtime shootout ending in a 60–52 owl victory is now regarded as the most exciting in school history. Holding a 10–1 regular season record, Kennesaw received a first round bye as the fourth seed in the FCS playoffs. In the second round the Owls hosted the Wofford Terriers, winning 13–10. The Owls lost in the quarterfinals for the second year in a row the following week at home against South Dakota State. Kennesaw finished the season ranked 5th in the FCS STATS poll and 4th in the coach's poll, the best in the short history.

At the conclusion of the 2019 season that saw Kennesaw go 11–3, the Owls tallied a 48–15 total record from the start of the program. That put the Owls as the winningest startup football program through the first five years of playing football.

== National championships ==
=== Team ===
| Association | Division | Sport | Year | Opponent/Runner-Up | Score |
|---|---|---|---|---|---|
| NCAA | Division II | Softball | 1995 | Bloomsburg | 3–2 (5 inn.) |
| NCAA | Division II | Softball | 1996 | Nebraska–Omaha | 6–4 |
| NCAA | Division II | Baseball | 1996 | Saint Joseph's (IN) | 4–0 |
| NCAA | Division II | Women's soccer | 2003 | Franklin Pierce | 2–0 |
| NCAA | Division II | Men's basketball | 2004 | Southern Indiana | 84–59 |

=== Individual ===
| Association | Division | Sport | Year | Individual(s) | Event | Score |
|---|---|---|---|---|---|---|
| NCAA | Division II | Women's cross country | 1999 | Marjo Venalainen | Individual title | 20:48.20 |
| NCAA | Division II | Women's cross country | 2000 | Marjo Venalainen | Individual title | 21:33.60 |

== Facilities ==
- Fifth Third Bank Stadium
- KSU Convocation Center
- Stillwell Baseball Stadium

== Notable alumni ==
=== Baseball ===
- Alan Busenitz
- Max Pentecost

=== Football ===
- Darnell Holland
- Bronson Rechsteiner, known in WWE as Bron Breakker

=== Women's soccer ===
- Maylee Atthin-Johnson
- Sara Clapham
- Rebecca Nolin
- Tiffany Sornpao
