= Sammy Brown =

American gridiron football player (born 1990)

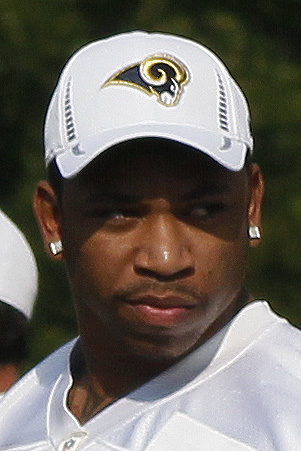

No. 57, 94
- Position: Defensive end

Personal information
- Born: April 17, 1990 (age 36); Hattiesburg, Mississippi, U.S.
- Listed height: 6 ft 2 in (1.88 m)
- Listed weight: 243 lb (110 kg)

Career information
- High school: Stone (Wiggins, Mississippi)
- College: Houston
- NFL draft: 2012: undrafted

Career history
- St. Louis Rams (2012)*; Miami Dolphins (2012); St. Louis Rams (2012–2013); Winnipeg Blue Bombers (2015)*; Edmonton Eskimos (2015)*; Winnipeg Blue Bombers (2015)*; Saskatchewan Roughriders (2016)*; Ottawa Redblacks (2016)*
- * Offseason or practice squad member only

Awards and highlights
- Third-team All-American (2011)
- Stats at Pro Football Reference

Sammy Brown (born April 17, 1990) is an American former professional football linebacker. He was a member of the Ottawa Redblacks of the Canadian Football League (CFL). He was signed by the Rams as an undrafted free agent in 2012. He played college football for the Houston Cougars and the Mississippi Gulf Coast Bulldogs.

He has also played for the Miami Dolphins.

== College career ==
Brown attended Stone High School in Wiggins, Mississippi. He spent his first two college seasons competing at Mississippi Gulf Coast Community College, where he totaled 64 tackles, one forced fumble, and two interceptions. He transferred to the University of Houston for the spring semester of his sophomore season and participated in spring practice. In his junior season, he played in all 12 games, starting 11 of them. He led Conference USA and finished fifth in the NCAA in tackles for loss with 20. He finished the season with 76 total tackles. In his senior season, Brown played in all 14 of Houston's games, and finished with 93 total tackles, 30 tackles for loss, and 13.5 sacks. Brown's 30 tackles for loss ranked second in the NCAA.

== Professional career ==
=== St. Louis Rams (first stint) ===
On May 5, 2012, he was signed by the Rams as an undrafted free agent. At the conclusion of 2012 training camp, Brown was released with the intention of him clearing waivers and being re-signed to the practice squad. However, he was picked up by the Miami Dolphins on waivers.

=== Miami Dolphins ===
Brown was claimed on waivers by the Dolphins on September 1, 2012. He was a healthy inactive in the team's season opener versus the Houston Texans. After 10 days with the team, Brown was released on September 11, 2012.

=== St. Louis Rams (second stint) ===
On September 14, the Rams brought Brown back, signing him to their practice squad. Brown became notable during the team's week 7 preparation, when Rams coach Jeff Fisher had Brown practice while wearing a long blond wig to emulate Green Bay Packers linebacker Clay Matthews. Brown was elevated to the active roster on November 30, 2012, to give the team a full group of linebackers in the absence of the injured Mario Haggan. He was once again released on August 26, 2014.

=== Winnipeg Blue Bombers ===
Added to the Winnipeg Blue Bombers (CFL) roster on May 14, 2015. Released a month later, on June 15, 2015.

=== Edmonton Eskimos ===
Signed to the practice roster of the Edmonton Eskimos (CFL) on September 15, 2015. Released on October 2, 2015.

=== Saskatchewan Roughriders ===
Was on the roster of the Saskatchewan Roughriders (CFL), but was transferred to the suspended list on May 29, 2016. He was released by the Riders on June 29, 2016.

=== Ottawa Redblacks ===
Brown signed onto the practice roster of the Ottawa Redblacks (CFL) on September 20, 2016; but was released on October 10, 2016. He was on and off the Redblacks roster for the remainder of the 2016 season and he was eventually released on April 10, 2017.

== Post Football Career ==
After his career in professional football, Brown transitioned into the realm of education and youth athletics in the St. Louis area. As a High School football coach at Oakville Sr. High school. Here, he coaches his prodigy Cale Cook. Currently, he serves as a recess aide and lunch lady at a local elementary school and frequently substitutes at Blarney Stone Elementary School. Additionally, he engages in motivational speaking within the school district, sharing his insights on “having that dog” and empowering children to pursue their dreams.
