= Rebecca Nolin =

English footballer and coach

Personal information
- Full name: Rebecca Jane Nolin
- Birth name: Rebecca Jane Hall
- Date of birth: 12 April 1983 (age 43)
- Place of birth: Kowloon, Hong Kong
- Height: 1.70 m (5 ft 7 in)
- Position: Defender

Youth career
- Caversham Ladies
- Slough Town Ladies

College career
Years	Team	Apps	(Gls)
2003–2006	Kennesaw State Owls		

Senior career*
Years	Team	Apps	(Gls)
2001–2003	Chelsea		
2007–2009	Atlanta Silverbacks Women	37	(3)
2010	Atlanta Beat	11	(0)
2011	Atlanta Silverbacks Women		

Managerial career
- 2014–2016: Valdosta State Blazers
- * Club domestic league appearances and goals

Rebecca Jane Nolin (née Hall; born 12 April 1983) is an English football coach and former professional player who represented Atlanta Beat of Women's Professional Soccer (WPS) as a defender and midfielder. She also played for Atlanta Silverbacks Women and Chelsea.

== Career ==
=== England ===
Nolin was born in Hong Kong but grew up in Windsor, England. She began playing for Slough Town Ladies at aged 15 and later joined Chelsea in 2001. After becoming captain of Chelsea in 2001 and having trials with the England Under-18 squad, Nolin was offered a scholarship by Kennesaw State University in 2003.

=== United States ===
In four seasons as a starter with the Kennesaw State Owls, Nolin's team won the NCAA Division II and move up to Division I. She captained the side, was named in various select-teams and scored 16 goals from defense. After graduating in Sports Management, Nolin joined Atlanta Silverbacks Women for their 2007 W-League campaign. In three seasons with the Silverbacks, Nolin made 11, 14 and 12 appearances respectively.

=== Professional ===
In 2010, Nolin attended the open trials for the new WPS franchise Atlanta Beat on the advice of her university coach. She was selected and signed to the team for their inaugural season.

In May 2010, Nolin scored Atlanta Beat's first goal at their new Kennesaw State University Soccer Stadium, during an exhibition game against Tampa Bay Hellenic. The last-minute header secured a 1–1 draw for the Beat; Nolin described scoring at her old university's facility as a "...dream come true". When St. Louis Athletica folded mid-way through the season, Atlanta Beat inherited six of their players (including Nolin's compatriot Eniola Aluko). However, Nolin retained her own place on the roster.

KSU appointed Nolin to the coaching staff of its soccer program in July 2010. She served as head coach of the Valdosta State Blazers for three seasons from 2014 to 2016.
