= Deborah Jones Gambrell =

American judge

Personal details
- Born: 1951 or 1952 (age 73–74) Jasper County, Mississippi, U. S.
- Party: Democratic

Deborah Gambrell Chambers (née Jones; born 1951 or 1952) is an American lawyer and judge in Hattiesburg, Mississippi. She has led legal groups, been part of various boards, and served with civic groups.

Gambrell was born in Jasper County, Mississippi. She was the eldest of six children. Her parents were educators Needham Jones, a former Tuskegee Airman, and Myrtle Jones. She went to Locker High School in Wiggins, Mississippi and the University of Southern Mississippi, graduating in 1972. While studying at Jackson School of Law (predecessor of Mississippi College School of Law), she was a mother of two children. She graduated cum laude in 1978. Gambrell was then admitted to the bar in December 1978 and began practicing law.

Gambrell is a Democrat. In 1980, she became court justice of Forrest County, and continued serving until 2011. In January 2011, Governor Haley Barbour appointed Gambrell chancery judge for Mississippi's 10th district.

== Honors ==
In 1973, Gambrell was honored in the Outstanding Young Women of America program. In 2009, she was honored with House Resolution 70. In 2014, she was inducted into the University of Southern Mississippi's Hall of Fame. In 2022, she received a judicial excellence award.

== Personal life ==
Deborah Jones originally married Andrew Gambrell. They had two daughters, born 1972 and 1975. They divorced in July 1981. She later married Vincent Chambers. They had four daughters, including triplets born in 1992. She lives in McLaurin, Mississippi.
