= Fred Stillwell Stadium =

Baseball venue in Georgia, United States

- Interactive map of Fred Stillwell Stadium
- Location: State University Road, Kennesaw, Georgia, US
- Coordinates: 34.033464°N 84.581850°W
- Owner: Kennesaw State University
- Operator: Kennesaw State University
- Capacity: 1,200
- Surface: Natural grass
- Scoreboard: Electronic
- Record attendance: 1,455 (Georgia, April 4th, 2013)
- Field size: Left field: 331 feet (101 m); Left center field: 370 feet (110 m); Center field: 400 feet (120 m); Right center field: 367 feet (112 m); Right field: 330 feet (100 m)

Construction
- Opened: 1984
- Closed: 2024
- Demolished: 2024

Tenants
- Kennesaw State Owls (NCAA) (1984–present); Peach Belt Tournament (1998); NCAA Division II Regional (1998)

Website
- Stillwell Baseball Stadium

Fred Stillwell Stadium was a baseball venue located in Kennesaw, Georgia, US. It was home to the Kennesaw State Owls. Stillwell Stadium was home to the program since its 1984 inception until the 2024 when it was demolished to be replaced by Mickey Dunn Stadium, built on the same location. Its seating capacity was 1,200 spectators.

The park featured seating from bullpen to bullpen and also terrace-style seating beyond the left field fence. A press box was located behind home plate. Stillwell was part of the Bobbie Bailey Athletic Complex, which also features a clubhouse and workout facilities.

Kennesaw Mountain is located south of the field and is visible if one looks past home plate from the outfield.

In 1998, the field hosted both the Peach Belt Conference Baseball Tournament and an NCAA Division II regional tournament.

== See also ==
- List of NCAA Division I baseball venues
