= Stevon Moore =

American football player (born 1967)

No. 27
- Position: Safety

Personal information
- Born: February 9, 1967 (age 59); Wiggins, Mississippi
- Listed height: 5 ft 11 in (1.80 m)
- Listed weight: 210 lb (95 kg)

Career information
- High school: Stone
- College: Mississippi
- NFL draft: 1989: 7th round, 181st overall pick

Career history
- New York Jets (1989); Miami Dolphins (1990–1991); Cleveland Browns (1992–1995); Baltimore Ravens (1996–1999)

Awards and highlights
- First-team All-SEC (1988)

Career NFL statistics
- Tackles: 643
- Interceptions: 10
- Fumble recoveries: 11
- Stats at Pro Football Reference

Stevon Nathaniel Moore (born February 9, 1967) is an American former professional football player from Wiggins, Mississippi who was selected by the New York Jets in the seventh round of the 1989 NFL draft with the 181st overall pick. A 5'11", 204-lb. safety from the University of Mississippi, Moore played in nine NFL seasons from 1990 to 1999.
