= W. P. Locker School =

Secondary school in Mississippi, United States

Locker High School

Location
- 532 E Central Ave; Wiggins, Mississippi 39577; United States
- Coordinates: 30.8509447°N 89.1337816°W

Information
- Former name: Stone County Training School
- Type: Public
- Grades: K–12

W. P. Locker School was a public secondary school in Wiggins, Mississippi, United States. It was the only high school in Stone County, Mississippi for black students until the public schools were integrated in 1969. The buildings are now Stone Middle School.

== History ==
Stone county did not provide any educational opportunities for black students past grade 8 until 1955, when Stone County Training School was built. The first high school for black students in Stone County was renamed W.P. Locker High School in 1959 in honor of W. P. Locker, who was born a slave in 1854 in North Carolina, and later became an educator. Although it was called a high school, Locker contained grades K–12. In 1969, due to federally mandated integration, the Locker students were transferred to Stone High School. Locker was demoted to a middle school, and its principal, Needham Jones, a former Tuskegee airman, was demoted to assistant principal at the middle school, although he was more qualified than the white principal of Stone. Jones sued and won, but retired rather than take the position of principal at Stone High School.

== Notable alumni ==
- Deborah Jones Gambrell, judge
