= Stone High School (Mississippi) =

Location
- 1376 Tomcat Trail; Wiggins, MS; 39577; United States; 30°50′20″N 89°08′39″W

Information
- Type: Public
- School district: Stone County School District
- Principal: Cyntria Young
- Teaching staff: 53.99 (FTE)
- Grades: 9–12
- Enrollment: 722 (2023-2024)
- Student to teacher ratio: 13.37
- Colors: Blue and White
- Mascot: Tomcat
- Website: www.stoneschools.org/stone-high-school

Stone High School is a public high school located in Wiggins, Mississippi, United States. It is the only high school in the Stone County School District.

== History ==
Prior to federally mandated integration in 1969, Stone County maintained separate schools for white students and black students. Stone High School served the white students, while Stone County Training School, built in 1955 and renamed W.P. Locker High School in 1959, served African-American students. After integration, Locker became Stone Middle School. Locker's principal, Needham Jones, a former Tuskegee airman, was demoted to assistant principal at Stone Middle, although he was more qualified than the white principal at Stone High. Jones sued and won, but retired rather than take the position of principal at Stone High.

In 2016, a group of white students at Stone High put a noose around a black student's neck. Local law enforcement discouraged the student's family from filing a report. The student was disciplined by the school and removed from the football team by coach John Feaster, the school's first African-American coach in any sport. In 2016, 75% of the school's 800 students were white.

A 2017 report showed that white students were 3.2 times more likely to be in an AP class than black students, and that black students were 3 times more likely to be disciplined than white students.

On July 23, 2026, school board members held a ribbon-cutting ceremony to celebrate the opening of Stone County's new high school located in Wiggins. Financing for the US$30 million construction project was achieved through a 2022 bond referendum supported by 60% of county voters plus supplemental funding through grants. In addition to the high school, the campus also includes a recently constructed career and technical education center and a new football, track and field stadium with synthetic turf. Property for the 40-acre (16 ha) campus was donated by local businessmen.

== Gallery ==
Career & technical education center

Tomcat stadium

== Notable alumni ==
- Chris Boykin, television personality
- Sammy Brown, professional football player
- D.J. Davis, professional baseball player
- Justin Evans, professional football player
- Marcus Hinton, professional football player
- Rebekah Jones, data scientist and geographer
- Fred Lewis, professional baseball player
- Stevon Moore, professional football player

== Notable faculty ==
- Ode Burrell, professional football player, coached at Stone High
