= Kennesaw State Owls baseball =

Atlantic Sun NCAA Division I baseball team

Kennesaw State Owls
- 2026 Kennesaw State Owls baseball team
- Founded: 1984
- Overall record: 419–393
- University: Kennesaw State University
- Head coach: Ryan Coe (5th season)
- Conference: Conference USA
- Location: Kennesaw, Georgia
- Home stadium: Fred Stillwell Stadium (Capacity: 900)
- Nickname: Owls
- Colors: Black and gold

College World Series champions
- Division II: 1996

College World Series runner-up
- Division II: 1998, 1999

College World Series appearances
- Division II: 1996, 1997, 1998, 2003

NCAA regional champions
- 2014

NCAA tournament appearances
- Division II; 1995, 1996, 1997, 1998, 1999, 2000, 2001, 2002, 2003, 2005 Division I 2014, 2022

Conference tournament champions
- 2014, 2022

Conference regular season champions
- 2016

The Kennesaw State Owls baseball team represents Kennesaw State University, which is located in Kennesaw, Georgia. The Owls are an NCAA Division I college baseball program that competes in Conference USA. They began competing in Division I in 2006, joining Conference USA in 2024.

The Kennesaw State Owls play all home games on campus at Fred Stillwell Stadium. Under the direction of Head Coach Mike Sansing, the Owls have played in one NCAA tournament. Over their fifteen seasons in the Atlantic Sun Conference (ASUN), they won one conference regular season title and two ASUN tournaments.

Since the program's inception in 1984, eight Owls have gone on to play in Major League Baseball, highlighted by 2005 World Series champion Willie Harris. Over the program's 37 seasons, 55 Owls have been drafted, including Max Pentecost and Chad Jenkins who were selected in the first round of the 2014 and 2009 drafts, respectively. The Owls won the NAIA World Series in 1994. They joined NCAA Division II in 1995 and won the 1996 NCAA Division II baseball tournament.

== Conference membership history (Division I only) ==
- 2006–2024: ASUN Conference
- 2025–present: Conference USA

== Fred Stillwell Stadium ==
Fred Stillwell Stadium is a baseball stadium on the Kennesaw State campus in Kennesaw, Georgia, that seats 900 people. It opened in 1984. A record attendance of 1,314 was set on April 3, 2012 in a game against Georgia Tech.

== Head coaches (Division I only) ==
Records taken from the 2020 KSU baseball record book.

Season	Coach	Years	Record	Pct.
2006–2021	Mike Sansing	15	419–393	.516
2022–present	Ryan Coe	3	93–81	.534
Totals	2 coaches	18 seasons	512–474	.519

== Year-by-year NCAA Division I results ==
Records taken from the 2020 KSU baseball record book.

Statistics overview
Season	Coach	Overall	Conference	Standing	Postseason
Atlantic Sun Conference (2006–present)
2006	Mike Sansing	24–32	12–18	T-8th	
2007	Mike Sansing	32–23	13–14	T-5th	
2008	Mike Sansing	30–26	21–12	2nd	
2009	Mike Sansing	30–22	20–9	2nd	
2010	Mike Sansing	23–32	12–15	8th	
2011	Mike Sansing	32–25	18–11	3rd	ASUN tournament
2012	Mike Sansing	34–25	15–11	3rd	ASUN tournament
2013	Mike Sansing	30–30	13–14	T-6th	ASUN tournament
2014	Mike Sansing	40–24	17–9	3rd	ASUN tournament Louisville Super Regional
2015	Mike Sansing	28–28	10–10	6th	ASUN tournament
2016	Mike Sansing	29–27	17–4	1st	ASUN tournament
2017	Mike Sansing	25–32	10–11	5th	ASUN tournament
2018	Mike Sansing	25–30	11–10	3rd	ASUN tournament
2019	Mike Sansing	27–29	11–13	7th	
2020	Mike Sansing	10–8	0-0	N/A	Season canceled on March 12 due to Coronavirus pandemic
2021	Mike Sansing	29-22	13-8	2nd (East)	ASUN tournament
2022	Ryan Coe	36-28	19-11	1st (East)	ASUN tournament Hattiesburg Regional
Total:		455–421			
National champion Postseason invitational champion Conference regular season champion Conference regular season and conference tournament champion Division regular season champion Division regular season and conference tournament champion Conference tournament champion

== NCAA Division I Tournament history ==
- The NCAA Division I baseball tournament started in 1947.
- The format of the tournament has changed through the years.
- Kennesaw State began playing Division I baseball in 2006.

Year	Record	Pct	Notes
2014	3–3	.500	Eliminated by Louisville in Louisville Super Regional
2022	1–2	.333	Eliminated by Southern Miss in Hattiesburg Regional
Totals	4–5	.444	

== Awards and honors (Division I only) ==
- Over their 15 seasons in Division I, two Owls have been named to an NCAA-recognized All-America team.
- Over their 15 seasons in the ASUN Conference, 18 different Owls have been named to the all-conference first-team.

=== Johnny Bench/Buster Posey Award ===
Year	Name
2014	Max Pentecost

=== All-Americans ===
Year	Position	Name	Team	Selector
2009	P	Chad Jenkins	3rd	CB
2014	C	Max Pentecost	1st	ABCA
2014	C	Max Pentecost	1st	BA
2014	C	Max Pentecost	1st	CB
2014	C	Max Pentecost	1st	NCBWA
2022	OF	Josh Hatcher	3rd	CB

=== Freshman All-Americans ===
Year	Position	Name	Selector
2013	SS	Kal Simmons	CB
2015	DH	Taylor Allum	CB
2016	SS	David Chabut	CB
2018	3B	Tyler Simon	CB
2022	1B	Donovan Cash	CB, NCBWA

=== ASUN Conference Player of the Year ===
Year	Position	Name
2014	C	Max Pentecost

=== ASUN Conference Defensive Player of the Year ===
Year	Position	Name
2017	2B	Grant Williams

=== ASUN Conference Pitcher of the Year ===
Year	Handedness	Name
2009	Right	Chad Jenkins

=== ASUN Conference Coach of the Year ===
Year	Name
2016	Mike Sansing

=== ASUN Conference Freshman of the Year ===
Year	Position	Name
2022	1B	Donovan Cash

Taken from the 2020 KSU baseball record book. Updated March 15, 2020.

== Owls in the Major Leagues ==
= All-Star	= Baseball Hall of Famer

Athlete	Years in MLB	MLB teams
Willie Harris	2001–2012	Baltimore Orioles, Chicago White Sox, Boston Red Sox, Atlanta Braves, Washington Nationals, New York Mets, Cincinnati Reds
Brian Mallette	2002	Milwaukee Brewers
Jason Jones	2003	Texas Rangers
Jason Childers	2006	Tampa Bay Devil Rays
Brett Campbell	2006	Washington Nationals
Chad Jenkins	2012–2015	Toronto Blue Jays
Justin Freeman	2013	Cincinnati Reds
Alan Busenitz	2017–2018, 2023–2024	Minnesota Twins, Cincinnati Reds
Richard Lovelady	2019–2025	Kansas City Royals, Oakland Athletics, Chicago Cubs, Tampa Bay Rays, Toronto Blue Jays, New York Mets
Travis Bergen	2019–2021	San Francisco Giants, Toronto Blue Jays, Arizona Diamondbacks

Sources Updated 11 August 2025.

== See also ==
- List of NCAA Division I baseball programs
