= Justin Evans (American football) =

American football player (born 1995)

No. 21, 30
- Position: Safety

Personal information
- Born: August 26, 1995 (age 31); Hattiesburg, Mississippi, U.S.
- Listed height: 6 ft 0 in (1.83 m)
- Listed weight: 199 lb (90 kg)

Career information
- High school: Stone (Wiggins, Mississippi)
- College: Mississippi Gulf Coast CC (2013–2014); Texas A&M (2015–2016)
- NFL draft: 2017: 2nd round, 50th overall pick

Career history
- Tampa Bay Buccaneers (2017–2020); New Orleans Saints (2022); Philadelphia Eagles (2023)

Awards and highlights
- Second-team All-SEC (2016)

Career NFL statistics
- Total tackles: 169
- Forced fumbles: 2
- Fumble recoveries: 2
- Interceptions: 4
- Defensive touchdowns: 1
- Stats at Pro Football Reference

Justin Evans (born August 26, 1995) is an American former professional football player who was a safety in the National Football League (NFL). He played college football at Mississippi Gulf Coast before transferring to the Texas A&M Aggies.

== Professional career ==
=== Pre-draft ===
Evans received an invitation to the Senior Bowl and was able to impress scouts during practice. He was unable to participate during the actual game due to injury. He attended the NFL Combine and only completed the bench press due to a quad injury. Evans also participated at Texas A&M's Pro Day and completed the majority of combine drills he was unable to finish at the combine. He opted to not run the short shuttle and three-cone drill. The majority of NFL draft experts and analysts projected Evans to be a second or third round pick. He was ranked the sixth best strong safety by DraftScout.com, the tenth best safety by Sports Illustrated, and was ranked the ninth best safety in the draft by ESPN.

Pre-draft measurables
Height	Weight	Arm length	Hand span	Wingspan	40-yard dash	10-yard split	20-yard split	Vertical jump	Broad jump	Bench press	Wonderlic
5 ft 11 5/8 in (1.82 m)	199 lb (90 kg)	32 in (0.81 m)	9 3/4 in (0.25 m)	6 ft 4 5/8 in (1.95 m)	4.60 s	1.57 s	2.67 s	41.5 in (1.05 m)	10 ft 9 in (3.28 m)	14 reps	25
All values from NFL Combine/Texas A&M's Pro Day

=== Tampa Bay Buccaneers ===
External videos
- Buccaneers draft Justin Evans 50th overall
- 2017 NFL Draft Profile: Justin Evans

==== 2017 ====
The Tampa Bay Buccaneers selected Evans in the second round (50th overall) of the 2017 NFL draft. Evans was the seventh safety drafted in 2017. On May 25, 2017, Evans signed a four-year, $5.19 million contract with the team.

Throughout training camp, Evans competed to be a starting safety against J. J. Wilcox, Chris Conte, and Keith Tandy.

External videos
- Evans dives in the end zone for an interception
- Justin Evans picks off Brett Hundley on a deep pass

He made his professional regular season debut in the Buccaneers against the Chicago Bears and made one solo tackle during a 29–7 victory. On October 5, 2017, Evans earned his first career start after Keith Tandy sustained a hip injury. Evans collected a season-high nine combined tackles, deflected two passes, and made his first career interception during a 19–14 loss against the New England Patriots in Week 5 on Monday Night Football. He intercepted a pass by Patriots' quarterback Tom Brady, that was initially intended for wide receiver Chris Hogan, and returned it for a two-yard gain on the first drive of the game. In Week 15, Evans recorded six combined tackles and sustained an ankle injury during a 24–21 loss against the Atlanta Falcons. On December 20, 2017, the Buccaneers placed Evans on injured reserve due to an ankle injury. Evans finished his rookie season in 2017 with 66 combined tackles (50 solo), six pass deflections, and three interceptions in 14 games and 11 starts.

==== 2018–2020 ====
Evans entered training camp slated as a starting safety, but saw competition from Chris Conte, Keith Tandy, and Jordan Whitehead. Head coach Dirk Koetter named Evans and Chris Conte the starting safeties to begin the regular season in 2018.

External videos
- Justin Evans scoops up Gillislee's fumble for a TD
- Evans jumps onfeon of JuJu for INT on Big Ben

He started in the Buccaneers' season-opener at the New Orleans Saints and made five combined tackles and returned a fumble recovery for a 34-yard touchdown during a 48–40 victory. Evans recovered a fumble and returned it for a 34-yard touchdown during the second quarter after teammate Vernon Hargreaves forced the fumble by Saints' running back Mike Gillislee. On September 24, 2018, Evans made six combined tackles, a pass deflection, and an interception during a 30–27 loss against the Pittsburgh Steelers in Week 3. Evans sustained a toe injury in Week 10 and missed the next two games (Weeks 11–12). In Week 10, he collected a season-high nine combined tackles during a 16–3 loss against the Washington Redskins. On December 2, 2018, Evans recorded two solo tackles during a 24–17 win against the Carolina Panthers in Week 13, but was carted off the field in the second quarter after aggravating his toe injury. He missed the next two games (Weeks 14–15) before he was placed on injured reserve on December 18, 2018. He finished the 2018 NFL season with 59 combined tackles (43 solo), two pass deflections, one interception, a fumble recovery, and one touchdown. He received an overall grade of 67.7 from Pro Football Focus, which ranked as the 52nd best grade among all qualified safeties in 2018.

On September 10, 2019, Evans was placed on injured reserve with an Achilles injury. He was placed on the active/physically unable to perform list (PUP) at the start of training camp on July 28, 2020. Evans was moved to the reserve/PUP list at the start of the regular season on September 5. On December 22, Evans was waived by the Buccaneers with a "failed physical" designation.

=== New Orleans Saints ===
On April 4, 2022, after missing the 2021 season, Evans signed a one-year contract with the New Orleans Saints.

=== Philadelphia Eagles ===
On March 20, 2023, Evans signed with the Philadelphia Eagles. He was named the Eagles starting safety to begin the season. He was placed on injured reserve on October 13, with a knee injury.
