= Max Pentecost =

American baseball player (born 1993)

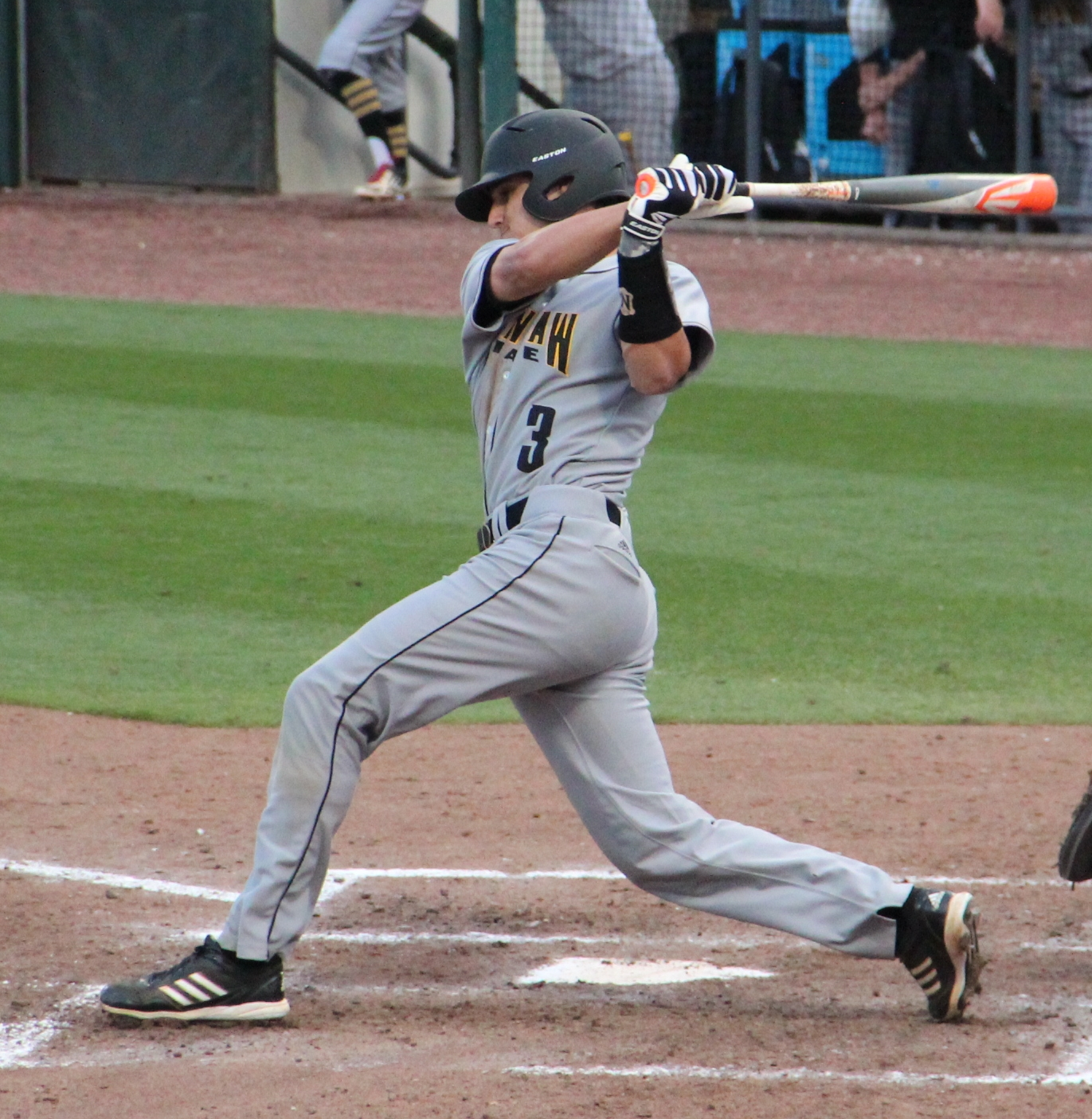
- Catcher
- Born: March 10, 1993 (age 33); Winder, Georgia, U.S.
- Bats: Right Throws: Right
- Stats at Baseball Reference

Maxwell Glen Pentecost (born March 10, 1993) is an American former professional baseball catcher. Prior to playing professionally, Pentecost attended Kennesaw State University, where he played college baseball for the Kennesaw State Owls baseball team. He was selected in the first round of the 2014 Major League Baseball draft by the Blue Jays.

== High school and college ==
Pentecost attended Winder-Barrow High School in Winder, Georgia. He suffered an arm injury during his senior year, which required surgery. The Texas Rangers selected Pentecost in the seventh round, with the 234th overall selection, of the 2011 Major League Baseball (MLB) Draft. He opted not to sign with Texas, instead enrolling at Kennesaw State University, where he played college baseball for the Kennesaw State Owls in the Atlantic Sun Conference. After his sophomore year at Kennesaw State, he played collegiate summer baseball for the Bourne Braves of the Cape Cod Baseball League (CCBL), where he was named the league's most valuable player and Perfect Game's College Summer Player of the Year. Pentecost was named to the CCBL Hall of Fame in 2023. As a junior, Pentecost won the Atlantic Sun Player of the Year Award and Johnny Bench Award. He was also a finalist for the Dick Howser Trophy.

== Professional career ==
Pentecost was seen by Jim Callis of MLB.com as a likely first round pick in the upcoming 2014 Major League Baseball draft, and the best pure catcher in the draft. The Toronto Blue Jays selected Pentecost in the first round, with the 11th overall selection. Pentecost signed with the Blue Jays on July 2, for the full bonus slot value of $2.9 million. He was assigned to the Gulf Coast Blue Jays of the Rookie-level Gulf Coast League because he did not have his passport at the time. Blue Jays GM Alex Anthopoulos had intended to assign Pentecost to the Vancouver Canadians of the Low-A Northwest League. In his second professional game on July 8, he went 5-for-5 with two doubles, two runs scored and two runs batted in (RBI). Pentecost was promoted to Vancouver on July 15. He played until August 7, when a wrist injury ended his season. In 25 total games, Pentecost batted .324 with 12 RBI. On October 1, Pentecost was named eighth-best prospect in the Northwest League by Baseball America.

In January 2015, Pentecost was named by MLB as the 10th best catching prospect in baseball. He underwent shoulder surgery in February 2015, and missed the entire 2015 season while rehabbing. Prior to the start of the 2016 minor league season, Pentecost was ranked 9th on MLB's top 10 catching prospects list. He opened the 2016 minor league season on the disabled list with the Lansing Lugnuts of the Single-A Midwest League. On May 12, Pentecost appeared in his first game in over 16 months, and hit the first home run of his professional career in a 5–0 win for the Lugnuts. As he was not cleared to catch, Pentecost continued to play as a designated hitter. After hitting .314 with seven home runs and 34 RBI the Lugnuts in 62 games, Pentecost was promoted to the High-A Dunedin Blue Jays. He played 12 games with Dunedin in 2016, and hit .245 with three home runs and seven RBI. Aside from one rehab game in the Gulf Coast League, Pentecost spent the entire 2017 season with Dunedin. He was limited to 72 games due to two separate disabled list stints, and hit .274 with nine home runs and 54 RBI. Pentecost played for the Peoria Javelinas of the Arizona Fall League (AFL) during the offseason, but he was deactivated in the last week of the AFL's season due to shoulder pain. The Blue Jays opted not to place him on their 40-man roster to protect him from the Rule 5 draft.

On January 24, 2018, the Blue Jays invited Pentecost to spring training. He spent the 2018 season with the New Hampshire Fisher Cats of the Double-A Eastern League, hitting .253 with 10 home runs and 52 RBI in 89 games.

On March 22, 2019, it was announced that Pentecost had left Blue Jays' spring training, and was considering retirement. His retirement was confirmed on April 3.
