= Chad Jenkins =

American baseball player (born 1987)

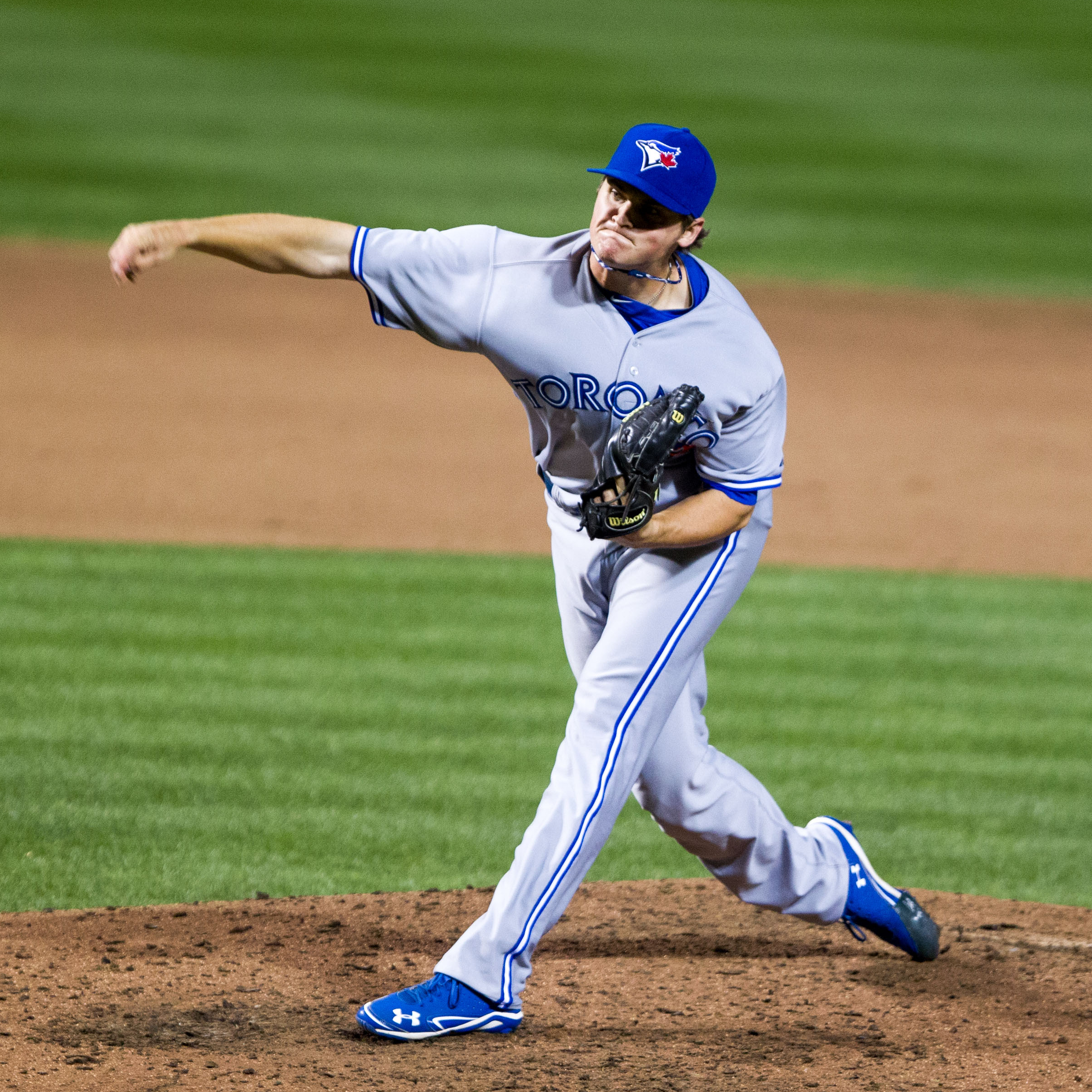
- Jenkins with the Toronto Blue Jays in 2012
- Pitcher
- Born: December 22, 1987 (age 38); Chattanooga, Tennessee, U.S.
- Batted: Right Threw: Right

MLB debut
- August 7, 2012, for the Toronto Blue Jays

Last MLB appearance
- October 1, 2015, for the Toronto Blue Jays

MLB statistics
- Win–loss record: 3–4
- Earned run average: 3.31
- Strikeouts: 51
- Stats at Baseball Reference

Teams
- Toronto Blue Jays (2012–2015)

Stephen Chadwick Jenkins (born December 22, 1987) is an American former professional baseball pitcher. He played in Major League Baseball (MLB) for the Toronto Blue Jays.

== Career ==
Jenkins played high school baseball at Cherokee High School in Georgia. Jenkins attended Kennesaw State University, where he played college baseball for the Owls under head coach Mike Sansing. As a junior, Jenkins was named the A-Sun Pitcher of the Year after going 8–1 with a 2.54 ERA, along with a 9.6 K/9, and a 1.03 WHIP.

=== Toronto Blue Jays ===
Jenkins was selected in the first round (20th overall) of the 2009 MLB draft by the Toronto Blue Jays, and was given a $1,359,000 signing bonus. Baseball America ranked Jenkins as the Blue Jays 3rd best prospect going into 2010. Jenkins was called up to the Blue Jays on August 5, 2012, after posting a record of 5-9 with a 4.96 ERA in Double-A.

Jenkins made his major league debut on August 7, 2012, throwing the last 3 innings in a 4-1 loss to the Tampa Bay Rays. He surrendered only 2 hits, while striking out 2 and not issuing a walk.

Jenkins was called up from the Double-A New Hampshire Fisher Cats by the Blue Jays on May 11, 2013. He was optioned down to the Triple-A Buffalo Bisons on June 1. After a stint on the disabled list, he was optioned down to the Fisher Cats on August 10. Jenkins was recalled by the Blue Jays on August 24.

Jenkins was optioned to the Buffalo Bisons on March 16, 2014, and recalled on April 26. He was recalled for the fourth time in the 2014 season on June 3, and for the fifth time on July 31. Jenkins pitched 6 shutout innings in relief of Mark Buehrle on August 10 and earned the win, 6–5, after a 19-inning marathon against the Detroit Tigers. The game was the longest in Blue Jays franchise history in terms of both innings and time elapsed (6 hours, 37 minutes). Jenkins was optioned back to Buffalo on August 16, and was recalled to Toronto on August 27, 2014. On September 4, Jenkins was hit by a ball during batting practice while in the outfield shagging fly balls. It broke his right hand, ending his season.

Jenkins was optioned to the Buffalo Bisons on March 25, 2015. He was recalled on May 3, and returned to Buffalo on May 8. On September 11, Jenkins was called up by the Blue Jays.

On February 6, 2016, Jenkins was designated for assignment by the Blue Jays to make room on the 40-man roster for Gavin Floyd. He was outrighted to Triple-A Buffalo on February 12. Jenkins was invited to Major League spring training, and was assigned to minor league camp on March 25. On June 30, Jenkins was released.
