= 2016 College Baseball All-America Team =

This is a list of college baseball players named first team All-Americans for the 2016 NCAA Division I baseball season. From 2015 to 2018, there were six generally recognized All-America selectors for baseball: the American Baseball Coaches Association, Baseball America, Collegiate Baseball Newspaper, D1Baseball, the National Collegiate Baseball Writers Association, and Perfect Game. In order to be considered a "consensus" All-American, a player must have been selected by at least four of these.

== Key ==
| A | American Baseball Coaches Association |
| B | Baseball America |
| C | Collegiate Baseball Newspaper |
| D | D1Baseball.com |
| N | National Collegiate Baseball Writers Association |
| P | Perfect Game |
| | Member of the National College Baseball Hall of Fame |
| | Consensus All-American – selected by all six organizations |
| | Consensus All-American – selected by four or five organizations |

== All-Americans ==
| Position | Name | School | # | A | B | C | D | N | P | Other awards and honors |
|---|---|---|---|---|---|---|---|---|---|---|
| Starting pitcher | Thomas Hatch | Oklahoma State | 1 | — | — | — | ✓ | — | — | |
| Starting pitcher | Drew Harrington | Louisville | 2 | — | — | ✓ | — | ✓ | — | |
| Starting pitcher | Kevin Hill | South Alabama | 1 | — | — | ✓ | — | — | — | |
| Starting pitcher | Connor Jones | Virginia | 3 | ✓ | — | — | — | ✓ | ✓ | |
| Starting pitcher | Eric Lauer | Kent State | 6 | ✓ | ✓ | ✓ | ✓ | ✓ | ✓ | Collegiate Baseball Player of the Year National Pitcher of the Year |
| Starting pitcher | Joey Lucchesi | Southeast Missouri State | 1 | — | — | ✓ | — | — | — | |
| Starting pitcher | Kade McClure | Louisville | 1 | — | — | — | — | ✓ | — | |
| Starting pitcher | A. J. Puckett | Pepperdine | 5 | ✓ | ✓ | ✓ | ✓ | — | ✓ | |
| Starting pitcher | Cody Sedlock | Illinois | 1 | — | ✓ | — | — | — | — | |
| Starting pitcher | Logan Shore | Florida | 6 | ✓ | ✓ | ✓ | ✓ | ✓ | ✓ | |
| Starting pitcher | Tyler Wilson | Rhode Island | 2 | ✓ | — | — | — | — | ✓ | |
| Relief pitcher | Shaun Anderson | Florida | 1 | — | — | — | — | ✓ | — | |
| Relief pitcher | Zack Burdi | Louisville | 1 | — | — | — | — | ✓ | — | |
| Relief pitcher | Sam Donko | VCU | 1 | — | — | — | — | ✓ | — | |
| Relief pitcher | Bryan Garcia | Miami (FL) | 1 | — | — | — | — | ✓ | — | Stopper of the Year |
| Relief pitcher | Pat Krall | Clemson | 1 | — | — | — | — | — | ✓ | |
| Relief pitcher | Mike Morrison | Coastal Carolina | 1 | — | — | ✓ | — | — | — | |
| Relief pitcher | Troy Rallings | Washington | 6 | ✓ | ✓ | ✓ | ✓ | ✓ | ✓ | |
| Catcher | Zack Collins | Miami (FL) | 5 | ✓ | ✓ | — | ✓ | ✓ | ✓ | Johnny Bench Award |
| Catcher | Nick Feight | UNC Wilmington | 1 | — | — | ✓ | — | — | — | |
| Catcher | Chris Okey | Clemson | 1 | — | — | — | — | ✓ | — | |
| First baseman | Pete Alonso | Florida | 3 | — | — | — | ✓ | ✓ | ✓ | |
| First baseman / DH | Jameson Fisher | Southeastern Louisiana | 3 | ✓ | — | ✓ | ✓ | — | — | |
| First baseman | Eric Gutierrez | Texas Tech | 1 | — | ✓ | — | — | — | — | |
| Second baseman | Ryne Birk | Texas A&M | 1 | — | ✓ | — | — | — | — | |
| Second baseman | Brian Mims | UNC Wilmington | 2 | ✓ | — | — | — | ✓ | — | |
| Second baseman | Jake Noll | Florida Gulf Coast | 2 | — | — | — | ✓ | — | ✓ | |
| Second baseman | Trey York | East Tennessee State | 2 | ✓ | — | ✓ | — | — | — | |
| Shortstop | C. J. Chatham | Florida Atlantic | 2 | ✓ | — | ✓ | — | — | — | |
| Shortstop | Sheldon Neuse | Oklahoma | 3 | — | — | — | ✓ | ✓ | ✓ | Brooks Wallace Award |
| Shortstop | Taylor Walls | Florida State | 1 | — | ✓ | — | — | — | — | |
| Third baseman / DH | Will Craig | Wake Forest | 6 | ✓ | ✓ | ✓ | ✓ | ✓ | ✓ | |
| Third baseman | Nick Senzel | Tennessee | 1 | — | — | — | — | — | ✓ | |
| Third baseman | Boomer White | Texas A&M | 1 | — | ✓ | — | — | — | — | |
| Outfielder | Seth Beer | Clemson | 5 | ✓ | ✓ | — | ✓ | ✓ | ✓ | Dick Howser Trophy |
| Outfielder | Alex Call | Ball State | 1 | — | — | ✓ | — | — | — | |
| Outfielder | Anfernee Grier | Auburn | 1 | — | ✓ | — | — | — | — | |
| Outfielder | Kyle Lewis | Mercer | 5 | ✓ | ✓ | ✓ | ✓ | — | ✓ | Golden Spikes Award ABCA Player of the Year Baseball America Player of the Year |
| Outfielder | Connor Owings | Coastal Carolina | 2 | ✓ | — | — | — | ✓ | — | |
| Outfielder | Corey Ray | Louisville | 4 | ✓ | — | — | ✓ | ✓ | ✓ | |
| Outfielder | Ryan Scott | Little Rock | 2 | ✓ | — | ✓ | — | — | — | |
| Designated hitter | G. K. Young | Coastal Carolina | 2 | ✓ | — | — | — | ✓ | — | |
| Utility player | Darick Hall | Dallas Baptist | 2 | — | — | ✓ | — | — | ✓ | |
| Utility player | Brendan McKay | Louisville | 4 | ✓ | ✓ | — | ✓ | ✓ | — | John Olerud Award |

== See also ==
- List of college baseball awards
