= 2016 UC Santa Barbara Gauchos baseball team =

American college baseball season

2016 UC Santa Barbara Gauchos baseball

Louisville Super Regional champions Nashville Regional champions
- Conference: Big West Conference

Ranking
- Coaches: No. 7
- AP: No. 6
- Record: 43–20–1 (13–11 Big West)
- Head coach: Andrew Checketts (5th season)
- Assistant coaches: Neil Walton (4th season); Eddie Cornejo (5th season); Matt Harvey (2nd season)
- Home stadium: Caesar Uyesaka Stadium

2016 Big West Conference baseball standings
	Conf.						Overall
Team	W		L		T	PCT	W		L		T	PCT
#28 Cal State Fullerton †^{y} ‍‍‍	17	–	7	–	0	.708	36	–	22	–	0	.621
Long Beach State ‍‍‍^{y}	15	–	9	–	0	.625	37	–	21	–	0	.638
No. 6 UC Santa Barbara ‍‍‍^{y}	13	–	11	–	0	.542	38	–	18	–	1	.675
Cal Poly ‍‍‍	12	–	12	–	0	.500	32	–	25	–	0	.561
Hawaii ‍‍‍	12	–	12	–	0	.500	23	–	30	–	0	.434
UC Riverside ‍‍‍	12	–	12	–	0	.500	26	–	29	–	0	.473
UC Irvine ‍‍‍	11	–	13	–	0	.458	31	–	25	–	0	.554
Cal State Northridge ‍‍‍	11	–	13	–	0	.458	33	–	22	–	0	.600
UC Davis ‍‍‍	5	–	19	–	0	.208	17	–	36	–	0	.321
† – Conference champion y – Invited to the NCAA tournament As of June 5, 2016; Rankings from Collegiate Baseball

The 2016 UC Santa Barbara Gauchos baseball team represented the University of California, Santa Barbara in the 2016 NCAA Division I baseball season, the team competed in the Big West Conference and was led by head coach Andrew Checketts, who was in his fifth season with the program. They played their home games at Caesar Uyesaka Stadium.

The Gauchos finished the season with a 43–20–1 overall record. In the Big West Conference, they had a record of 13–11, and finished third in the standings. The team earned an at-large bid to the 2016 NCAA Tournament. The Gauchos won the Nashville Regional, hosted by Vanderbilt. They then won the Louisville Super Regional. For the first time in program history, UC Santa Barbara reached the College World Series in Omaha, Nebraska. They lost to Oklahoma State in the first round before beating Miami (FL). They then lost to eventual runner-up Arizona, finishing with a 1–2 record in the College World Series.

== Notable players ==
Shane Bieber was a pitcher who played for the Gauchos in 2016. He later went on play professionally, joining the Cleveland Guardians of Major League Baseball.

== Schedule ==
Legend
	Gauchos win
	Gauchos loss
	Postponement
**Bold**	Gauchos team member

2016 UC Santa Barbara Gauchos baseball game log (43–20–1)
Regular season (37–18–1)

February (7–1)
Date	Time (PST)	TV	Opponent	Rank	Stadium	Score	Win	Loss	Save	Attendance	Overall	BWC
February 19	2:00 p.m.	—	San Francisco*	—	Caesar Uyesaka Stadium; Santa Barbara	8–2	**Bieber (1–0)**	Ponticelli (0–1)	None	400	1–0	—
February 20 (DH)	11:00 a.m.	—	San Francisco*	—	Caesar Uyesaka Stadium	6–5	**Nelson (1–0)**	Parker (0–1)	None	320	2–0	—
February 20 (DH)	2:30 p.m.	—	San Francisco*	—	Caesar Uyesaka Stadium	13–5	**Bettencourt (1–0)**	Post (0–1)	None	360	3–0	—
February 21	1:00 p.m.	—	San Francisco*	—	Caesar Uyesaka Stadium	7–3	**Record (1–0)**	Goodman (0–1)	None	369	4–0	—
February 23	2:00 p.m.	—	vs. St. Mary's*	—	Caesar Uyesaka Stadium	4–7	Loeprich (1–0)	**Bettencourt (1–1)**	Gonsolin (2)	179	4–1	—
Tony Gwynn Legacy Tournament
February 26	1:00 p.m.	—	vs. Kentucky*	—	Tony Gwynn Stadium; San Diego, California	11–4	**Bieber (2–0)**	Brown (0–2)	None	200	5–1	—
February 27	1:00 p.m.	—	vs. Bryant*	—	Tony Gwynn Stadium	16–2	**Davis (1–0)**	Bingel (1–1)	None	876	6–1	—
February 28	10:00 a.m.	—	vs. San Diego*	—	Tony Gwynn Stadium	9–3	**Record (2–0)**	Richan (0–1)	None	450	7–1	—

March (11–4)
Date	Time (PST)	TV	Opponent	Rank	Stadium	Score	Win	Loss	Save	Attendance	Overall	BWC
March 1	2:00 p.m.	—	No. 21 UCLA*	No. 19	Caesar Uyesaka Stadium; Santa Barbara, California	11–6	**Chapman (1–0)**	Burke (0–1)	None	318	8–1	—
March 4	3:00 p.m.	—	at No. 7 Oregon*	No. 19	PK Park; Eugene, Oregon	1–13	Irvin (2–0)	**Bieber (2–1)**	None	1,533	8–2	—
March 5	12:00 p.m.	—	at No. 7 Oregon*	No. 19	PK Park	1–0	**Nelson (2–0)**	Stiles (0–1)	None	1,120	9–2	—
March 6	12:00 p.m.	—	at No. 7 Oregon*	No. 19	PK Park	1–3	Peterson (2–0)	**Record (2–1)**	Nogosek (4)	1,111	9–3	—
March 12 (DH)	11:00 p.m.	—	Hartford*	No. 22	Caesar Uyesaka Stadium	7–4	**Bieber (3–1)**	Gauthier (2–1)	**Bettencourt (1)**	215	10–3	—
March 12 (DH)	2:00 p.m.	—	Hartford*	No. 22	Caesar Uyesaka Stadium	2–1	**Nelson (3–0)**	LaRossa (0–1)	None	230	11–3	—
March 13	1:00 p.m.	—	Hartford*	No. 22	Caesar Uyesaka Stadium	7–6	**Bettencourt (2–1)**	McKay (0–1)	**Nelson (1)**	260	12–3	—
March 18	3:00 p.m.	—	UConn*	No. 21	Caesar Uyesaka Stadium	5–3	**Nelson (4–0)**	Polonia (1–1)	None	350	13–3	—
March 19	2:00 p.m.	—	UConn*	No. 21	Caesar Uyesaka Stadium	9–6	**Hatton (1–0)**	Darras (1–1)	**Bettencourt (2)**	340	14–3	—
March 20	1:00 p.m.	—	UConn*	No. 21	Caesar Uyesaka Stadium	6–2	**Record (3–1)**	Rossomando (0–2)	None	300	15–3	—
March 22	6:00 p.m.	—	at Cal State Bakersfield*	No. 17	Hardt Field; Bakersfield, California	10–4	**Hatton (1–0)**	Carter (0–3)	None	508	16–3	—
March 24	3:00 p.m.	—	USC*	No. 17	Caesar Uyesaka Stadium	10–1	**Bieber (4–1)**	Wheatley (0–2)	None	400	17–3	—
March 25	3:00 p.m.	—	USC*	No. 17	Caesar Uyesaka Stadium	5–2	**Davis (2–0)**	Wegman (2–1)	**Nelson (2)**	550	18–3	—
March 26	2:00 p.m.	—	at USC*	No. 17	Dedeaux Field; Los Angeles, California	5–9	Navilhon (1–2)	**Record** (3–2)	None	1,364	18–4	—
March 29	3:00 p.m.	—	at Pepperdine*	No. 11	Eddy D. Field; Malibu, California	2–6	Green (1–0)	**Chapman (1–1)**	Garcia (1)	335	18–5	—

April (10–5–1)
Date	Time (PST)	TV	Opponent	Rank	Stadium	Score	Win	Loss	Save	Attendance	Overall	BWC
April 1	6:00 p.m.	—	at No. 26 Long Beach State	No. 11	Blair Field; Long Beach, California	4–3	**Bieber (5–1)**	Mathewson (3–3)	**Nelson (3)**	1,616	19–5	1–0
April 2	2:00 p.m.	—	at No. 26 Long Beach	No. 11	Blair Field	3–1	**Davis (3–0)**	McCaughan (4–1)	**Nelson (4)**	1,393	20–5	2–0
April 3	1:00 p.m.	—	at No. 26 Long Beach	No. 11	Blair Field	0–2	Brown (4–2)	**Record (3–3)**	Rivera (11)	1,614	20–6	2–1
April 8	3:00 p.m.	—	at College of Charleston*	No. 12	CofC Baseball Stadium at Patriots Point; Mount Pleasant, South Carolina	7–4	**Bieber (6–1)**	Helvey (4–3)	None	422	21–6	—
April 9	11:30 a.m.	—	at College of Charleston*	No. 12	CofC Baseball Stadium at Patriots Point	3–10	Ober (3–1)	**Davis (3–1)**	None	616	21–7	—
April 10	10:00 a.m.	—	at College of Charleston*	No. 12	CofC Baseball Stadium at Patriots Point	6–6	No Decision			461	21–7–1	—
April 15	3:00 p.m.	—	CSUN	No. 13	Caesar Uyesaka Stadium; Santa Barbara, California	1–0	**Bieber (7–1)**	Rodriguez (3–3)	None	400	22–7–1	3–1
April 16	2:00 p.m.	—	CSUN	No. 13	Caesar Uyesaka Stadium	5–4	**Nelson (5–0)**	Diaz (1–1)	None	425	23–7–1	4–1
April 17	1:00 p.m.	—	CSUN	No. 13	Caesar Uyesaka Stadium	8–2	**Record (4–3)**	O'Neil (3–4)	**Bettencourt (3)**	375	24–7–1	5–1
April 18	3:00 p.m.	—	Nevada*	No. 11	Caesar Uyesaka Stadium	5–4	**Nelson (6–0)**	McMahan (1–1)	None	200	25–7–1	—
April 22	6:00 p.m.	—	at Cal Poly	No. 11	Baggett Stadium; San Luis Obispo, California	0–7	Smith (5–3)	**Bieber (7–2)**	None	1,302	25–8–1	5–2
April 23	6:00 p.m.	—	at Cal Poly	No. 11	Baggett Stadium	5–10	Uelmen (5–0)	**Davis (3–2)**	None	2,269	25–9–1	5–3
April 24	1:00 p.m.	—	at Cal Poly	No. 11	Baggett Stadium	3–4	Zill (4–1)	**Record (4–4)**	Calomeni (6)	1,505	25–10–1	5–4
April 26	3:00 p.m.	—	St. Mary's*	No. 21	Louis Guisto Field; Moraga, California	4–3 (11)	**Bettencourt (3–1)**	Holdgrafer (0–1)	None	124	26–10–1	—
April 29	3:00 p.m.	—	Hawai'i	No. 21	Caesar Uyesaka Stadium	14–2	**Bieber (8–2)**	Hornung (3–7)	None	210	27–10–1	6–4
April 30	2:00 p.m.	—	Hawai'i	No. 21	Caesar Uyesaka Stadium	6–3	**Bettencourt (4–1)**	Chew (0–3)	None	500	28–10–1	7–4

May (9–8)
Date	Time (PST)	TV	Opponent	Rank	Stadium	Score	Win	Loss	Save	Attendance	Overall	BWC
May 1	1:00 p.m.	—	Hawai'i	No. 21	Caesar Uyesaka Stadium; Santa Barbara, California	5–4	**Davis (4–2)**	Valencia (3–1)	None	400	29–10–1	8–4
May 3	3:00 p.m.	—	Pepperdine*	No. 13	Caesar Uyesaka Stadium	4–3	**Hatton (3–0)**	Pendergast (2–3)	**Bettencourt (4)**	150	30–10–1	—
May 6	2:30 p.m.	—	UC Davis	No. 13	Dobbins Stadium; Davis, California	2–6	Brown (1–3)	**Bieber (8–3)**	None	272	30–11–1	8–5
May 7	3:00 p.m.	—	UC Davis	No. 13	Dobbins Stadium	7–3	**Record (5–4)**	Henderson (1–3)	**Nelson (5)**	382	31–11–1	9–5
May 8	1:00 p.m.	—	UC Davis	No. 13	Dobbins Stadium	3–13	Hamby (3–4)	**Hatton (3–1)**	None	402	31–12–1	9–6
May 10	3:00 p.m.	—	Cal State Bakersfield*	No. 26	Caesar Uyesaka Stadium	4–5	Coats (1–0)	**Bettencourt (4–2)**	Gusbeth (3)	200	31–13–1	—
May 13	3:00 p.m.	—	No. 15 Cal State Fullerton	No. 26	Caesar Uyesaka Stadium	3–2	**Bieber (9–3)**	Seabold (6–4)	**Nelson (6)**	600	32–13–1	10–6
May 14	2:00 p.m.	—	No. 15 Cal State Fullerton	No. 26	Caesar Uyesaka Stadium	2–18	Gavin (5–2)	**Davis (4–3)**	None	568	32–14–1	10–7
May 15	1:00 p.m.	—	No. 15 Cal State Fullerton	No. 26	Caesar Uyesaka Stadium	3–6	Prohoroff (1–1)	**Nelson (6–1)**	Serigstad (4)	575	32–15–1	10–8
May 17	6:00 p.m.	—	UCLA*	—	Jackie Robinson Stadium; Pasadena, California	4–3	**Kelly (1–0)**	Forbes (1–2)	**Nelson (7)**	200	33–15–1	—
May 20	6:30 p.m.	—	UC Irvine	—	Anteater Ballpark; Irvine, California	10–3	**Bieber (10–3)**	Surrey (3–6)	None	746	34–15–1	11–8
May 21	7:00 p.m.	Fox Sports	UC Irvine	—	Anteater Ballpark	4–5	Faucher (2–0)	**Nelson (6–2)**	None	605	34–16–1	11–9
May 22	6:00 p.m.	ESPNU	UC Irvine	—	Anteater Ballpark	9–5	**Nelson (7–2)**	Faucher (2–1)	None	541	35–16–1	12–9
May 23	3:00 p.m.	—	Gonzaga*	—	Caesar Uyesaka Stadium	6–5	**Davis (5–3)**	LeBrun (5–3)	None	300	36–16–1	—
May 26	3:00 p.m.	—	UC Riverside	—	Caesar Uyesaka Stadium	1–3	Sodders (7–4)	**Davis (5–4)**	Fagalde (3)	250	36–17–1	12–10
May 27	3:00 p.m.	—	UC Riverside	—	Caesar Uyesaka Stadium	2–1	**Bieber (11–3)**	Delgado (1–8)	**Nelson (8)**	400	37–17–1	13–10
May 28	1:00 p.m.	—	UC Riverside	—	Caesar Uyesaka Stadium	0–6	Landazuri (5–5)	**Record (5–5)**	None	500	37–18–1	13–11

Postseason (6–2)

Vanderbilt Regional (3–0)
Date	Time (PST)	TV	Opponent	Rank	Stadium	Score	Win	Loss	Save	Attendance	Overall	NCAAT Record
June 3	12:00 p.m.	—	vs. No. 21 Washington	—	Hawkins Field; Nashville, Tennessee	3–2 (14)	**Kelly (2–0)**	Nesbitt (6–3)	None	1,898	38–18–1	1–0
June 5	12:00 p.m.	—	vs. Xavier	—	Hawkins Field	5–4	**Davis (6–4)**	Astle (5–5)	**Kelly (1)**	2,039	39–18–1	2–0
June 6	12:00 p.m.	—	vs. Xavier	—	Hawkins Field	14–5	**Record (6–5)**	Jacknewitz (1–7)	None	1,944	40–18–1	3–0

Louisville Super Regional (2–0)
Date	Time (PST)	TV	Opponent	Rank	Stadium	Score	Win	Loss	Save	Attendance	Overall	NCAAT Record
June 11	9:00 a.m.	—	vs. No. 5 Louisville	No. 14	Jim Patterson Stadium; Louisville, Kentucky	4–2	**Bieber (12–3)**	McKay (12–4)	**Nelson (9)**	4,634	41–18–1	4–0
June 12	9:00 a.m.	—	vs. No. 5 Louisville	No. 14	Jim Patterson Stadium	4–3	**Chandler (1–0)**	Burdi (1–3)	None	4,784	42–18–1	5–0

College World Series (1–2)
Date	Time (PST)	TV	Opponent	Rank	Stadium	Score	Win	Loss	Save	Attendance	Overall	NCAAT Record
June 18	12:00 p.m.	ESPN 2	vs. No. 6 Oklahoma State	No. 8	TD Ameritrade Park; Omaha, Nebraska	0–1	Hatch (9–2)	**Bieber (12–4)**	None	20,956	42–19–1	5–1
June 19	12:00 p.m.	ESPNU	vs. No. 2 Miami	No. 8	TD Ameritrade Park	5–3	**Davis (7–4)**	Garcia (9–5)	**Nelson (10)**	15,748	43–19–1	6–1
June 20	12:00 p.m.	ESPN	vs. No. 7 Arizona	No. 8	TD Ameritrade Park	0–3	Cloney (7–4)	**Kelly (2–1)**	Ming (3)	22,133	43–20–1	6–2

*Non-conference game. ^{#}Rankings from D1Baseball. (#) Tournament seedings in parentheses.
All times are in Pacific.

== Rankings ==
Ranking movements Legend: ██ Increase in ranking ██ Decrease in ranking — = Not ranked
	Week																		
Poll	Pre	1	2	3	4	5	6	7	8	9	10	11	12	13	14	15	16	17	Final
Coaches'	—	—*	—*	—	—	22	19	20	19	14	19	14	18	—	21	23	23*	23*	7
Baseball America	—	—	—	—	—	24	18	12	13	9	17	15	24	—	—	—	—*	—*	9
Collegiate Baseball^	—	—	19	22	21	17	11	12	13	11	21	13	26	—	—	—	14	8	6
NCBWA†	—	—	—	—	30	26	22	23	20	14	16	13	16	20	19	21	13	13*	7

^ Collegiate Baseball ranked 40 teams in their preseason poll, but only ranked 30 teams weekly during the season.
† NCBWA ranks 30 teams in their preseason poll, but only ranks 25 teams weekly during the season.
* A new poll was not released for this week, so for comparison purposes, the previous week's ranking is inserted in this week's slot.
