= 2016 NCAA Division I baseball tournament =

US college baseball tournament

- Season: 2016
- Teams: 64
- Finals site: TD Ameritrade Park; Omaha, Nebraska
- Champions: Coastal Carolina Chanticleers (1st title)
- Runner-up: Arizona Wildcats (16th CWS Appearance)
- Winning coach: Gary Gilmore (1st title)
- MOP: Andrew Beckwith (Coastal Carolina)
- Television: ESPN Networks

The 2016 NCAA Division I baseball tournament began on Friday, June 3, 2016, as part of the 2016 NCAA Division I baseball season. The 64-team, double-elimination tournament concluded with the 2016 College World Series (CWS) in Omaha, Nebraska, starting on June 18, 2016, and ending on June 30, 2016. The 64 participating NCAA Division I college baseball teams were selected out of 298 eligible teams. Thirty-one teams were awarded an automatic bid, as champions of their conferences; the remaining 33 teams were selected at-large by the NCAA Division I Baseball Committee.

Teams were divided into sixteen regionals of four teams, which conducted a double-elimination tournament. Regional champions faced each other in Super Regionals, a best-of-three-game series to determine the eight participants of the College World Series. The Atlantic Coast Conference (ACC) set a conference record and tied the all-time mark of having ten teams in the championship field. A tournament-high seven regional hosts came from the Southeastern Conference (SEC), followed by six of the ten ACC schools; however, only Miami (ACC) and Florida (SEC) advanced to Omaha, and they were the first and second teams eliminated, respectively. For the first time since the tournament expanded from 48 teams in 1999, the NCAA did not select any Pac-12 schools to host a regional, and Lubbock, Texas, (Texas Tech) was the westernmost regional host city picked by the selection committee.

In the CWS after Texas Tech lost to Big 12 rival TCU, none of the three national seeds who had reached Omaha had won their opening game. Tech eventually became the fourth team to be eliminated. While Oklahoma State and TCU advanced through the winners' bracket to set up a possible all–Big 12 championship, Arizona and Coastal Carolina won both elimination games to advance to the best-of-three final series.

With each team winning a game in the championship series to force a winner-take-all Game 3, the tournament reached the maximum of 17 games for the first time; the finals expanded in 2003 to a best-of-three format as opposed to a single, winner-take-all championship game. Coastal Carolina won the deciding game, 4–3, becoming the first team since 1956 to win the title in its first CWS appearance. Coastal Carolina won six elimination games in NCAA post-season play – one in a Regional, three in the CWS double-elimination bracket, and two in the Championship Series. The runner-up, Arizona, won six elimination games – three in a Regional and three in the CWS double-elimination bracket, but lost their 7th, the last game of the Championship Series.

This was the first, and as of 2025, only, national championship won by the Coastal Carolina athletic program in any sport. In addition, this remains the only team national championship won in any sport by a member of the Big South Conference (hours after Coastal Carolina won the title game, they officially left the Big South and became members of the Sun Belt Conference.)

== Bids ==
=== Automatic bids ===
School	Conference	Record (Conf)	Berth	Last NCAA appearance
Binghamton	America East	30–23 (19–5)	Tournament	2014 (Stillwater Regional)
Connecticut	American	37–23 (14–9)	Tournament	2013 (Blacksburg Regional)
Clemson	ACC	42–18 (16–14)	Tournament	2015 (Fullerton Regional)
Stetson	Atlantic Sun	29–29 (9–12)	Tournament	2011 (Columbia Regional)
Rhode Island	Atlantic 10	30–25 (18–6)	Tournament	2005 (Long Beach Regional)
TCU	Big 12	42–15 (15–9)	Tournament	2015 (Fort Worth Regional)
Xavier	Big East	30–28 (14–4)	Tournament	2014 (Nashville Regional)
Coastal Carolina	Big South	44–15 (21–3)	Tournament	2015 (College Station Regional)
Ohio State	Big Ten	43–18–1 (15–9)	Tournament	2009 (Tallahassee Regional)
Cal State Fullerton	Big West	35–21 (17–7)	Regular season	2015 (Fullerton Regional)
William & Mary	Colonial	29–29 (14–9)	Tournament	2013 (Raleigh Regional)
Southern Miss	Conference USA	40–18 (20–10)	Tournament	2011 (Atlanta Regional)
Wright State	Horizon	44–15 (23–6)	Tournament	2015 (Champaign Regional)
Princeton	Ivy League	24–19 (13–7)	Championship series	2011 (Austin Regional)
Fairfield	Metro Atlantic	32–24 (17–7)	Tournament	First Appearance
Western Michigan	Mid-American	22–32 (11–13)	Tournament	1989 (Midwest Regional)
Bethune-Cookman	Mid-Eastern	29–25 (17–7)	Tournament	2014 (Coral Gables Regional)
Dallas Baptist	Missouri Valley	41–17 (15–5)	Tournament	2015 (Dallas Regional)
New Mexico	Mountain West	38–21 (20–10)	Tournament	2013 (Fullerton Regional)
Bryant	Northeast	47–10 (26–4)	Tournament	2014 (Baton Rouge Regional)
Southeast Missouri State	Ohio Valley	39–19 (22–8)	Tournament	2002 (Tuscaloosa Regional)
Utah	Pac-12	25–27 (19–11)	Regular season	2009 (Fullerton Regional)
Navy	Patriot	42–14–1 (15–5)	Tournament	2011 (Charlottesville Regional)
Texas A&M	Southeastern	45–14 (20–10)	Tournament	2015 (College Station Regional)
Western Carolina	Southern	30–29 (15–9)	Tournament	2007 (Chapel Hill Regional)
Sam Houston State	Southland	41–20 (24–6)	Tournament	2014 (Fort Worth Regional)
Alabama State	Southwestern Athletic	38–15 (24–0)	Tournament	First Appearance
Oral Roberts	Summit	38–19 (22–8)	Tournament	2014 (Waco Regional)
Louisiana–Lafayette	Sun Belt	41–19 (21–9)	Tournament	2015 (Houston Regional)
Saint Mary's	West Coast	33–23 (18–9)	Tournament	First Appearance
Utah Valley	Western Athletic	37–21 (18–9)	Tournament	First Appearance

=== By conference ===
Conference	Total	Schools
ACC	10	Boston College, Clemson, Duke, Florida State, Georgia Tech, Louisville, Miami (FL), NC State, Virginia, Wake Forest
SEC	7	Florida, LSU, Mississippi State, Ole Miss, South Carolina, Texas A&M, Vanderbilt
Conference USA	4	Florida Atlantic, Louisiana Tech, Rice, Southern Miss
Pac-12	4	Arizona, Arizona State, Utah, Washington
American	3	East Carolina, Tulane, UConn
Big Ten	3	Minnesota, Nebraska, Ohio State
Big 12	3	Oklahoma State, TCU, Texas Tech
Big West	3	Cal State Fullerton, Long Beach State, UC Santa Barbara
Colonial	2	UNC Wilmington, William & Mary
Southland	2	Sam Houston State, Southeastern Louisiana
Sun Belt	2	Louisiana–Lafayette, South Alabama
West Coast	2	Gonzaga, Saint Mary's (CA)
America East	1	Binghamton
Atlantic 10	1	Rhode Island
Atlantic Sun	1	Stetson
Big East	1	Xavier
Big South	1	Coastal Carolina
Horizon	1	Wright State
Ivy	1	Princeton
MAAC	1	Fairfield
Mid-American	1	Western Michigan
MEAC	1	Bethune-Cookman
Missouri Valley	1	Dallas Baptist
Mountain West	1	New Mexico
NEC	1	Bryant
Ohio Valley	1	Southeast Missouri State
Patriot	1	Navy
Southern	1	Western Carolina
SWAC	1	Alabama State
Summit	1	Oral Roberts
WAC	1	Utah Valley

== National seeds ==
The following eight teams automatically host a Super Regional if they advance to that round:

1. **Florida**
2. Louisville ‡
3. **Miami (FL)**
4. Texas A&M ‡
5. **Texas Tech**
6. Mississippi State ‡
7. Clemson †
8. LSU ‡

Bold indicates College World Series participant
† indicates teams that were eliminated in the Regional Tournament
‡ indicates teams that were eliminated in the Super Regional Tournament

== Regionals and Super Regionals ==
Bold indicates winner. Seeds for regional tournaments indicate seeds within regional. Seeds for super regional tournaments indicate national seeds only.

=== Gainesville Super Regional ===
Regional	Regional
1	**Florida**	**9**
4	Bethune-Cookman	3
1	**Florida**	**6**
3	UConn	5
3	**UConn**	**7**
2	Georgia Tech	6
Gainesville Regional – Alfred A. McKethan Stadium
4	Bethune-Cookman	3
2	**Georgia Tech**	**12**
2	**Georgia Tech**	**7**
3	UConn	5
1	**Florida State**	**18**
4	Alabama State	6
1	**Florida State**	**7**
2	Southern Miss	2
3	South Alabama	2
2	**Southern Miss**	**14**
Tallahassee Regional – Mike Martin Field at Dick Howser Stadium
4	Alabama State	3
3	**South Alabama**	**6**
3	**South Alabama**	**7**
2	Southern Miss	4

Regional Final
1	**Florida**	**10**	–
2	Georgia Tech	1	–
1	**Florida State**	**18**	–
3	South Alabama	6	–

Super Regional
1	**Florida**	0	**5**	**7**
Florida State	**3**	0	0

=== Baton Rouge Super Regional ===
Regional	Regional
1	**LSU**	**7**
4	Utah Valley	1
1	**LSU**	**4**
2	Rice	2
3	Southeastern Louisiana	2
2	**Rice**	**7**
Baton Rouge Regional – Alex Box Stadium
4	Utah Valley	2
3	**Southeastern Louisiana**	**3**
3	Southeastern Louisiana	0
2	**Rice**	**15**
1	**NC State**	**13**
4	Navy	8
1	NC State	0
2	**Coastal Carolina**	**4**
3	Saint Mary's (CA)	2
2	**Coastal Carolina**	**5**
Raleigh Regional – Doak Field
4	**Navy**	**8**
3	Saint Mary's (CA)	5^{13}
4	Navy	1
1	**NC State**	**17**

Regional Final
1	**LSU**	6	**5**
2	Rice	**10**	2
2	**Coastal Carolina**	1	**7**
1	NC State	**8**	5

Super Regional
8	LSU	8	3	–
**Coastal Carolina**	**11**	**4**	–

=== College Station Super Regional ===
Regional	Regional
1	**Texas A&M**	**4**
4	Binghamton	2
1	**Texas A&M**	**22**
3	Wake Forest	2
3	**Wake Forest**	**5**
2	Minnesota	3
College Station Regional – Olsen Field at Blue Bell Park
4	Binghamton	5
2	**Minnesota**	**8**
2	**Minnesota**	**8**
3	Wake Forest	3
1	**TCU**	**7**
4	Oral Roberts	0
1	**TCU**	**4**
3	Gonzaga	3
3	**Gonzaga**	**5**
2	Arizona State	1
Fort Worth Regional – Lupton Stadium
4	Oral Roberts	1
2	**Arizona State**	**4**
2	**Arizona State**	**6**
3	Gonzaga	3

Regional Final
1	**Texas A&M**	**8**	–
2	Minnesota	2	–
1	**TCU**	**8**	–
2	Arizona State	1	–

Super Regional
4	Texas A&M	2	**7**	1
**TCU**	**8**	1	**4**

=== Lubbock Super Regional ===
Regional	Regional
1	**Texas Tech**	**12**
4	Fairfield	1
1	**Texas Tech**	**4**
3	New Mexico	3
3	**New Mexico**	**12**
2	Dallas Baptist	6
Lubbock Regional – Dan Law Field at Rip Griffin Park
4	Fairfield	5
2	**Dallas Baptist**	**8**
2	**Dallas Baptist**	**5**
3	New Mexico	3
1	**Virginia**	**17**
4	William & Mary	4
1	Virginia	6
3	**East Carolina**	**8**
3	**East Carolina**	**9**
2	Bryant	1
Charlottesville Regional – Davenport Field
4	**William & Mary**	**4**
2	Bryant	3
4	**William & Mary**	**5**
1	Virginia	4

Regional Final
1	**Texas Tech**	6	**5**
2	Dallas Baptist	**10**	3
3	**East Carolina**	**8**	–
4	William & Mary	4	–

Super Regional
5	**Texas Tech**	6	**3**	**11**
East Carolina	**8**	1^{13}	0

=== Coral Gables Super Regional ===
Regional	Regional
1	**Miami (FL)**	**4**
4	Stetson	2
1	**Miami (FL)**	**4**
3	Long Beach State	3^{11}
3	**Long Beach State**	**5**
2	Florida Atlantic	1
Coral Gables Regional – Alex Rodriguez Park at Mark Light Field
4	Stetson	4
2	**Florida Atlantic**	**8**
2	Florida Atlantic	1
3	**Long Beach State**	**5**
1	Ole Miss	5
4	**Utah**	**6**^{10}
4	Utah	3
3	**Boston College**	**4**
3	**Boston College**	**7**
2	Tulane	2
Oxford Regional – Swayze Field
1	Ole Miss	5
2	**Tulane**	**6**
2	**Tulane**	**4**
4	Utah	1

Regional Final
1	**Miami (FL)**	**9**	–
3	Long Beach State	8	–
3	**Boston College**	**6**	–
2	Tulane	3	–

Super Regional
3	**Miami (FL)**	**12**	3	**9**
Boston College	7	**5**	4

=== Starkville Super Regional ===
Regional	Regional
1	**Mississippi State**	**9**
4	Southeast Missouri State	5
1	**Mississippi State**	**4**
2	Cal State Fullerton	1
3	Louisiana Tech	0
2	**Cal State Fullerton**	**1**
Starkville Regional – Dudy Noble Field
4	Southeast Missouri State	4
3	**Louisiana Tech**	**9**
3	**Louisiana Tech**	**6**
2	Cal State Fullerton	2
1	**Louisiana–Lafayette**	**5**
4	Princeton	3
1	**Louisiana–Lafayette**	**10**
2	Arizona	3
3	Sam Houston State	3
2	**Arizona**	**7**
Lafayette Regional – M. L. Tigue Moore Field
4	Princeton	2
3	**Sam Houston State**	**7**
3	Sam Houston State	5
2	**Arizona**	**6**

Regional Final
1	**Mississippi State**	**4**	–
3	Louisiana Tech	0	–
1	Louisiana–Lafayette	3	1
2	**Arizona**	**6**	**3**

Super Regional
6	Mississippi State	0	5	–
**Arizona**	**1**	**6**^{11}	–

=== Louisville Super Regional ===
This regional had high drama when UC Santa Barbara trailed Louisville 3-0 in the bottom of the 9th inning in game 2 of the super regional final. The Gauchos loaded the bases off all-American reliever Zack Burdi and then back up catcher Sam Cohen hit a pinch hit grand slam to send the Gauchos to Omaha for the first time.

Regional	Regional
1	**Louisville**	**6**
4	Western Michigan	1
1	**Louisville**	**15**
2	Ohio State	3
3	Wright State	6
2	**Ohio State**	**7**
Louisville Regional – Jim Patterson Stadium
4	Western Michigan	3
3	**Wright State**	**10**
3	**Wright State**	**7**
2	Ohio State	3
1	Vanderbilt	1
4	**Xavier**	**15**
4	Xavier	4
2	**UC Santa Barbara**	**5**
3	Washington	2
2	**UC Santa Barbara**	**3**^{14}
Nashville Regional – Hawkins Field
1	Vanderbilt	8
3	**Washington**	**9**
3	Washington	5
4	**Xavier**	**7**

Regional Final
1	**Louisville**	**3**	–
3	Wright State	1	–
2	**UC Santa Barbara**	**14**	–
4	Xavier	5	–

Super Regional
2	Louisville	2	3	–
**UC Santa Barbara**	**4**	**4**	–

=== Columbia Super Regional ===
Regional	Regional
1	**Clemson**	**24**
4	Western Carolina	10
1	Clemson	2
2	**Oklahoma State**	**12**
3	Nebraska	0
2	**Oklahoma State**	**6**
Clemson Regional – Doug Kingsmore Stadium
4	**Western Carolina**	**4**
3	Nebraska	1
4	Western Carolina	3
1	**Clemson**	**15**
1	South Carolina	4
4	**Rhode Island**	**5**
4	Rhode Island	7
2	**UNC Wilmington**	**11**
3	Duke	1
2	**UNC Wilmington**	**11**
Columbia Regional – Founders Park
1	**South Carolina**	**4**
3	Duke	2
1	**South Carolina**	**23**
4	Rhode Island	2

Regional Final
2	**Oklahoma State**	**9**	–
1	Clemson	2	–
2	UNC Wilmington	1	5
1	**South Carolina**	**10**	**10**

Super Regional
**Oklahoma State**	**5**	**3**	–
South Carolina	1	1	–

== College World Series ==
The College World Series was held at TD Ameritrade Park in Omaha, Nebraska.

=== Participants ===
School	Conference	Record (conference)	Head coach	Previous CWS Appearances	Best CWS Finish	CWS record Not including this year
Arizona	Pac-12	44–21 (16–14)	Jay Johnson	16 (last: 2012)	1st (1976, 1980, 1986, 2012)	38–27
Coastal Carolina	Big South	49–16 (21–3)	Gary Gilmore	none	none	0–0
Florida	SEC	52–14 (19–10)	Kevin O'Sullivan	9 (last: 2015)	2nd (2005, 2011)	14–19
Miami (FL)	ACC	50–12 (21–7)	Jim Morris	24 (last: 2015)	1st (1982, 1985, 1999, 2001)	48–40
Oklahoma State	Big 12	39–20 (16–8)	Josh Holliday	19 (last: 1999)	1st (1959)	38–36
TCU	Big 12	47–16 (15–9)	Jim Schlossnagle	3 (last: 2015)	3rd (2010, 2015)	6–6
Texas Tech	Big 12	44–16 (19–5)	Tim Tadlock	1 (2014)	7th (2014)	0–2
UC Santa Barbara	Big West	42–18–1 (13–11)	Andrew Checketts	none	none	0–0

=== Bracket ===
Seeds listed below indicate national seeds only

First round
1	Florida	1
**Coastal Carolina**	**2**
**TCU**	**5**
5	Texas Tech	3
1	Florida	2
5	**Texas Tech**	**3**
3	Miami (FL)	1
**Arizona**	**5**
UC Santa Barbara	0
**Oklahoma State**	**1**
3	Miami (FL)	3
**UC Santa Barbara**	**5**

Second round
Coastal Carolina	1
**TCU**	**6**
5	Texas Tech	5
**Coastal Carolina**	**7**
Arizona	0
**Oklahoma State**	**1**
UC Santa Barbara	0
**Arizona**	**3**

Semifinals
TCU	1	5
**Coastal Carolina**	**4**	**7**
Oklahoma State	3	1
**Arizona**	**9**	**5**

Championship series
**Coastal Carolina**	0	**5**	**4**
Arizona	**3**	4	3

=== Game results ===
Date	Game	Winner	Score	Loser	Winning pitcher	Losing pitcher	Save	Notes
June 18	Game 1	Oklahoma State	1–0	UC Santa Barbara	Thomas Hatch (9–2)	Shane Bieber (12–4)	—	
June 18	Game 2	Arizona	5–1	Miami (FL)	Nathan Bannister (12–2)	Michael Mediavilla (11–2)	—	
June 19	Game 3	TCU	5–3	Texas Tech	Ryan Burnett (3–1)	Robert Dugger (6–1)	Durbin Feltman (9)	
June 19	Game 4	Coastal Carolina	2–1	Florida	Andrew Beckwith (13–1)	Logan Shore (12–1)	—	
June 20	Game 5	UC Santa Barbara	5–3	Miami (FL)	Noah Davis (7–4)	Danny Garcia (9–5)	Kyle Nelson (10)	Miami (FL) eliminated
June 20	Game 6	Oklahoma State	1–0	Arizona	Tyler Buffett (9–3)	Bobby Dalbec (10–5)	Trey Cobb (6)	
June 21	Game 7	Texas Tech	3–2	Florida	Davis Martin (10–1)	Alex Faedo (13–3)	Hayden Howard (9)	Florida eliminated
June 21	Game 8	TCU	6–1	Coastal Carolina	Brian Howard (10–2)	Alex Cunningham (9–4)	Ryan Burnett (1)	
June 22	Game 9	Arizona	3–0	UC Santa Barbara	J.C. Cloney (7–4)	Justin Kelly (2–1)	Cameron Ming (3)	UC Santa Barbara eliminated
June 23	Game 10	Coastal Carolina	7–5	Texas Tech	Mike Morrison (8–1)	Erikson Lanning (3–4)	Bobby Holmes (4)	Texas Tech eliminated
June 24	Game 11	Arizona	9–3	Oklahoma State	Kevin Ginkel (5–1)	Jensen Elliot (9–5)	Cameron Ming (4)	
June 24	Game 12	Coastal Carolina	4–1	TCU	Andrew Beckwith (14–1)	Michael Traver (1–3)	—	
June 25	Game 13	Arizona	5–1	Oklahoma State	Bobby Dalbec (11–5)	Thomas Hatch (9–3)	Alfonso Rivas III (3)	Oklahoma State eliminated
June 25	Game 14	Coastal Carolina	7–5	TCU	Alex Cunningham (10–4)	Jared Janczak (7–4)	—	TCU eliminated
June 27	Final Game 1	Arizona	3–0	Coastal Carolina	J.C. Cloney (8–4)	Zack Hopeck (3–4)	—	
June 28	Final Game 2	Coastal Carolina	5–4	Arizona	Bobby Holmes (7–2)	Cameron Ming (3–3)	—	
June 30	Final Game 3	Coastal Carolina	4–3	Arizona	Andrew Beckwith (15–1)	Bobby Dalbec (11–6)	Alex Cunningham (1)	Coastal Carolina wins CWS

=== All-Tournament Team ===
The following players were members of the College World Series All-Tournament Team.

Position	Player	School
P	**Andrew Beckwith (MOP)**	Coastal Carolina
P	J. C. Cloney	Arizona
C	David Parrett	Coastal Carolina
1B	Ryan Aguilar	Arizona
2B	Cody Ramer	Arizona
3B	Zach Remillard	Coastal Carolina
SS	Ryan Merrill	TCU
OF	Anthony Marks	Coastal Carolina
OF	Zach Gibbons	Arizona
OF	Jared Oliva	Arizona
DH	Luken Baker	TCU

== Final standings ==
Seeds listed below indicate national seeds only

Place	School	Record
1st	Coastal Carolina	11–3
2nd	Arizona	11–4
3rd	Oklahoma State	7–2
3rd	TCU	7–3
5th	UC Santa Barbara	6–2
5th	No. 5 Texas Tech	6–4
7th	No. 1 Florida	5–3
7th	No. 3 Miami	5–3
9th	Boston College	4–2
9th	East Carolina	4–2
9th	Florida State	4–2
9th	No. 2 Louisville	3–2
9th	No. 8 LSU	3–3
9th	No. 6 Mississippi State	3–2
9th	South Carolina	4–3
9th	No. 4 Texas A&M	4–2
17th	Arizona State	2–2
17th	No. 7 Clemson	2–2
17th	Dallas Baptist	3–2
17th	Georgia Tech	2–2
17th	Long Beach State	2–2
17th	Louisiana–Lafayette	2–2
17th	Louisiana Tech	2–2
17th	Minnesota	2–2
17th	NC State	3–2
17th	Rice	3–2
17th	South Alabama	2–2
17th	Tulane	2–2
17th	UNC Wilmington	2–2
17th	William & Mary	2–2
17th	Wright State	2–2
17th	Xavier	2–2
33rd	Cal State Fullerton	1–2
33rd	Connecticut	1–2
33rd	Florida Atlantic	1–2
33rd	Gonzaga	1–2
33rd	Navy	1–2
33rd	New Mexico	1–2
33rd	Ohio State	1–2
33rd	Rhode Island	1–2
33rd	Sam Houston State	1–2
33rd	Southeastern Louisiana	1–2
33rd	Southern Miss	1–2
33rd	Utah	1–2
33rd	Virginia	1–2
33rd	Wake Forest	1–2
33rd	Washington	1–2
33rd	Western Carolina	1–2
49th	Alabama State	0–2
49th	Bethune-Cookman	0–2
49th	Binghamton	0–2
49th	Bryant	0–2
49th	Duke	0–2
49th	Fairfield	0–2
49th	Nebraska	0–2
49th	Ole Miss	0–2
49th	Oral Roberts	0–2
49th	Princeton	0–2
49th	Saint Mary's (CA)	0–2
49th	Southeast Missouri State	0–2
49th	Stetson	0–2
49th	Utah Valley	0–2
49th	Vanderbilt	0–2
49th	Western Michigan	0–2

== Record by conference ==
Conference	# of Bids	Record	Win %	Nc Record	Nc Win %	RF	SR	WS	NS	CS	NC
Big South	1	11–3	.786	11–3	.786	1	1	1	1	1	1
Pac-12	4	15–10	.600	15–10	.600	2	1	1	1	1	–
Big 12	3	20–9	.690	19–8	.704	3	3	3	2	–	–
Southeastern	7	19–17	.528	19–17	.528	5	5	1	–	–	–
Atlantic Coast	10	25–21	.543	22–18	.561	7	4	1	–	–	–
Big West	3	9–6	.600	9–6	.600	2	1	1	–	–	–
American	3	7–6	.538	7–6	.538	2	1	–	–	–	–
Conference USA	4	7–8	.467	7–8	.467	2	–	–	–	–	–
Colonial	2	4–4	.500	4–4	.500	2	–	–	–	–	–
Sun Belt	2	4–4	.500	4–4	.500	2	–	–	–	–	–
Big Ten	3	3–6	.333	3–6	.333	1	–	–	–	–	–
Southland	2	2–4	.333	2–4	.333	–	–	–	–	–	–
West Coast	2	1–4	.200	1–4	.200	–	–	–	–	–	–
Other	18	11–36	.234	11–36	.234	3	–	–	–	–	–

The columns RF, SR, WS, NS, CS, and NC respectively stand for the Regional Finals, Super Regionals, College World Series, National Semifinals, Championship Series, and National Champion.

Nc is non–conference records, i.e., with the records of teams within the same conference having played each other removed.

== Media coverage ==
=== Radio ===
NRG Media provided nationwide radio coverage of the College World Series through its Omaha station KOZN, in association with Westwood One. It was streamed at westwoodonesports.com and on TuneIn. Kevin Kugler and John Bishop called all games leading up to the Championship Series with Gary Sharp acting as the field reporter. The Championship Series was called by Kugler (Gms 1–2), Bishop (Gm 3), and Scott Graham. Ted Emrich acted as field reporter for Games 1 & 2.

=== Television ===
ESPN carried every game from the Regionals, Super Regionals, and College World Series across its networks. During the Regionals, ESPN offered a dedicated channel, ESPN Bases Loaded (carried in the same channel allotments as its "Goal Line" and "Buzzer Beater" services for football and basketball), which carried live look-ins and analysis across all games in progress, hosted by Brendan Fitzgerald and Matt Schick with Kyle Peterson providing analysis.

The final game of the tournament aired on ESPNU, as the NCAA scheduled the game for an afternoon start, and there were scheduling conflicts with ESPN and ESPN2 due to UEFA Euro 2016 and the 2016 Wimbledon Championships.

==== Broadcast assignments ====
Regionals

- Mike Morgan and Carlos Peña: Gainesville, Florida
- Trey Bender and Jerry Kindall: Tallahassee, Florida
- Steve Lenox and Wes Clements: Raleigh, North Carolina
- Lyn Rollins and Ben McDonald: Baton Rouge, Louisiana
- Mark Neely and Greg Swindell: Lubbock, Texas
- Taylor Zarzour and Nick Belmonte: Charlottesville, Virginia
- Roxy Bernstein and Keith Moreland: Fort Worth, Texas
- Clay Matvick and Gabe Gross: College Station, Texas

Super Regionals

- Dave Neal, Chris Burke, and Kaylee Hartung: Gainesville, Florida
- Mike Couzens and Nick Belmonte: Baton Rouge, Louisiana
- Roxy Bernstein and Wes Clements: Lubbock, Texas
- Tom Hart, Kyle Peterson, and Laura Rutledge: College Station, Texas

College World Series

- Jon Sciambi, Alex Cora, Dallas Braden or Kyle Peterson, and Kaylee Hartung (select): Afternoons, Wed night
- Karl Ravech, Eduardo Pérez, Kyle Peterson, and Kaylee Hartung: Evenings minus Wed

Regionals

- Dave Neal and Chris Burke: Louisville, Kentucky
- Mike Keith and Rusty Ensor: Nashville, Tennessee
- Matt Stewart and Jay Walker: Columbia, South Carolina
- Tom Hart and Mike Rooney: Clemson, South Carolina
- Doug Sherman and John Gregory: Starkville, Mississippi
- Brett Dolan and Tom Holliday: Lafayette, Louisiana
- Richard Cross and David Dellucci: Oxford, Mississippi
- Anish Shroff and Alex Cora: Miami, Florida

Super Regionals

- Mike Morgan and Mike Rooney: Louisville, Kentucky
- Mark Neely and Todd Walker: Columbia, South Carolina
- Clay Matvick and Ben McDonald: Starkville, Mississippi
- Anish Shroff and Alex Cora: Miami, Florida

College World Series Championship Series

- Karl Ravech, Eduardo Pérez, Kyle Peterson, Kaylee Hartung, and Alex Cora
