= 2016 Atlantic Coast Conference baseball tournament =

American college baseball tournament

- Format: Round-robin tournament
- Finals site: Durham Bulls Athletic Park; Durham, NC
- Champions: Clemson (10th title)
- Winning coach: Monte Lee (1st title)
- MVP: Mike Triller (Clemson)

2016 Atlantic Coast Conference baseball standings
	Conf.				Overall
Team	W		L	PCT	W		L	PCT
Atlantic
No. 11 Louisville ^{x}‍‍‍^{y}	22	–	8	.733	48	–	12	.800
No. 14 Florida State ‍‍‍^{y}	16	–	10	.615	38	–	20	.655
No. 20 NC State ‍‍‍^{y}	15	–	13	.536	36	–	20	.643
No. 18 Clemson ‍‍‡‍^{y}	16	–	14	.533	43	–	18	.705
No. 16 Boston College ‍‍‍^{y}	13	–	15	.464	35	–	22	.614
Wake Forest ‍‍‍^{y}	13	–	17	.433	35	–	25	.583
Notre Dame ‍‍‍	11	–	17	.393	27	–	27	.500
Coastal
No. 8 Miami (FL) ^{x}‍‍‍^{y}	21	–	7	.750	46	–	11	.807
No. 17 Virginia ‍‍‍^{y}	19	–	11	.633	38	–	20	.655
Duke ‍‍‍^{y}	14	–	15	.483	33	–	23	.589
Georgia Tech ‍‍‍^{y}	13	–	16	.448	36	–	24	.600
North Carolina ‍‍‍	13	–	17	.433	34	–	21	.618
Pittsburgh ‍‍‍	10	–	18	.357	25	–	26	.490
Virginia Tech ‍‍‍	6	–	24	.200	19	–	36	.345
x – Division champion ‡ – Tournament champion y – Invited to the NCAA tournament As of June 4, 2016; Rankings from Collegiate Baseball

The 2016 Atlantic Coast Conference baseball tournament was held from May 24 through 29 at Durham Bulls Athletic Park in Durham, North Carolina. The annual tournament determined the conference champion of the Division I Atlantic Coast Conference for college baseball. The tournament champion will receive the league's automatic bid to the 2016 NCAA Division I baseball tournament. This is the last of 19 athletic championship events held by the conference in the 2015–16 academic year.

Clemson, under first year head coach Monte Lee, defeated defending champion Florida State in the championship game to win its 10th ACC Tournament championship, breaking a tie with Georgia Tech for most tournament titles. The title was Clemson's 15th overall ACC championship in baseball (also most all-time in the conference), its first ACC championship since 2006, and first tournament championship under the pool play format that began in 2007. The championship game, hampered by weather delays, took 9 hours and 20 minutes to complete, with first pitch being thrown at 11:02 A.M. and the final out recorded at 7:22 P.M.

== Format and seeding ==
The winner of each seven team division and the top eight other teams based on conference winning percentage, regardless of division, from the conference's regular season will be seeded one through ten. Seeds one and two are awarded to the two division winners. The bottom four seeds play an opening round, with the winners advancing to pool play. The winner of each pool plays a single championship.

Atlantic Division
Team	W	L	Pct	GB	Seed
Louisville	22	8	.733	–	2
Florida State	16	10	.615	4	4
NC State	15	13	.536	6	5
Clemson	16	14	.533	6	6
Boston College	13	15	.464	8	8
Wake Forest	13	17	.433	9	10
Notre Dame	11	17	.393	10	–

Coastal Division
Team	W	L	Pct	GB	Seed
Miami (FL)	21	7	.750	–	1
Virginia	19	11	.633	3	3
Duke	14	15	.483	7.5	7
Georgia Tech	13	16	.448	8.5	9
North Carolina	13	17	.433	9	–
Pittsburgh	10	18	.357	11	–
Virginia Tech	6	24	.200	16	–

== Schedule and results ==
=== Play-in round ===
Tuesday, May 24
Team	R
#10 Wake Forest	4
#7 Duke	3

Tuesday, May 24
Team	R
#9 Georgia Tech	6
#8 Boston College	0

=== Pool play ===
	Division A	MIA	FSU	NCSU	GT	Overall
1	Miami (FL)		L 4–5	W 8–7	W 4–0	2–1
4	Florida State	W 5–4		W 7–3	W 6–1	3–0
5	North Carolina State	L 7–8	L 3–7		W 7-5	1–2
8	Georgia Tech	L 0–4	L 1–6	L 5-7		0–3

	Division B	LOU	UVA	CLEM	WF	Overall
2	Louisville		L 2–7	L 3–5	W 9–5	1–2
3	Virginia	W 7–2		L 4–5	L 9-10	1–2
6	Clemson	W 5–3	W 5–4		W 5-4	3–0
7	Wake Forest	L 5–9	W 10-9	L 4-5		1–2

Finals
A	Florida State	13
B	Clemson	18

=== Championship ===
Sunday, May 29 11:00 a.m.
Team	1	2	3	4	5	6	7	8	9	R	H	E
#6 Clemson	3	5	5	5	0	0	0	0	0	18	15	1
#4 Florida State	1	0	0	4	0	0	0	8	0	13	11	4
WP: Alex Bostic (4–2) LP: Ed Voyles (1–2) Sv: None; Home runs: CLEM: None; FSU: Tyler Holton (1), Dylan Busby 2 (12); Attendance: 4,863; Notes: Game Duration - 3:31; Boxscore

== Schedule ==
Game	Time*	Matchup^{#}	Television	Attendance
Tuesday, May 24
1	11:00 a.m.	#7 Duke vs. #10 Wake Forest	ACCRSN	2,717
2	3:00 p.m.	#8 Boston College vs. #9 Georgia Tech	ACCRSN	1,824
Wednesday, May 25
3	11:00 a.m.	#4 Florida State vs. #5 NC State	ACCRSN	3,409
4	3:00 p.m.	#1 Miami vs. #9 Georgia Tech	ACCRSN	2,140
5	7:00 p.m.	#2 Louisville vs. #10 Wake Forest	ACCRSN	2,671
Thursday, May 26
6	11:00 a.m.	#3 Virginia vs. #6 Clemson	ACCRSN	3,259
7	3:00 p.m.	#4 Florida State vs. #9 Georgia Tech	ACCRSN	2,504
8	7:00 p.m.	#1 Miami vs. #5 NC State	ACCRSN	5,692
Friday, May 27
9	11:00 a.m.	#2 Louisville vs. #6 Clemson	ACCRSN	—
10	3:00 p.m.	#3 Virginia vs. #10 Wake Forest	ACCRSN	—
11	7:00 p.m.	#5 NC State vs. #9 Georgia Tech	ACCRSN	—
Saturday, May 28
12	11:00 a.m.	#6 Clemson vs. #10 Wake Forest	ACCRSN	—
13	3:00 p.m.	#1 Miami vs. #4 Florida State	ACCRSN	—
14	7:00 p.m.	#2 Louisville vs. #3 Virginia	ACCRSN	—
Championship – Sunday, May 29
15	11:00 a.m.	#4 Florida State vs. #6 Clemson	ESPN2	—
*Game times in EDT. # – Rankings denote tournament seed.

== All-Tournament Team ==
Position	Player	School
Catcher	Matt Thaiss	Virginia
1st Base	Dylan Busby	Florida State
2nd Base	Johnny Ruiz	Miami
3rd Base	Edgar Michelangeli	Miami
Shortstop	Daniel Pinero	Virginia
Outfield	Jackson Lueck	Florida State
Outfield	Reed Rohlman	Clemson
Outfield	Matt Gonzalez	Georgia Tech
Utility/DH	Mike Triller‡	Clemson
Pitcher	Pat Krall	Clemson
Pitcher	Clate Schmidt	Clemson

‡ - Tournament MVP
