= 2016 Florida State Seminoles baseball team =

American college baseball season

2016 Florida State Seminoles baseball

Tallahassee Regional Champion

Gainesville Super Regional
- Conference: Atlantic Coast Conference
- Atlantic Division

Ranking
- Coaches: No. 13
- CB: No. 14
- Record: 41–22 (16–10 ACC)
- Head coach: Mike Martin (37th season)
- Assistant coach: Mike Martin, Jr. (19th season)
- Pitching coach: Mike Bell (5th season)
- Home stadium: Mike Martin Field at Dick Howser Stadium (Capacity: 6,700)

2016 Atlantic Coast Conference baseball standings
	Conf.				Overall
Team	W		L	PCT	W		L	PCT
Atlantic
No. 11 Louisville ^{x}‍‍‍^{y}	22	–	8	.733	48	–	12	.800
No. 14 Florida State ‍‍‍^{y}	16	–	10	.615	38	–	20	.655
No. 20 NC State ‍‍‍^{y}	15	–	13	.536	36	–	20	.643
No. 18 Clemson ‍‍‡‍^{y}	16	–	14	.533	43	–	18	.705
No. 16 Boston College ‍‍‍^{y}	13	–	15	.464	35	–	22	.614
Wake Forest ‍‍‍^{y}	13	–	17	.433	35	–	25	.583
Notre Dame ‍‍‍	11	–	17	.393	27	–	27	.500
Coastal
No. 8 Miami (FL) ^{x}‍‍‍^{y}	21	–	7	.750	46	–	11	.807
No. 17 Virginia ‍‍‍^{y}	19	–	11	.633	38	–	20	.655
Duke ‍‍‍^{y}	14	–	15	.483	33	–	23	.589
Georgia Tech ‍‍‍^{y}	13	–	16	.448	36	–	24	.600
North Carolina ‍‍‍	13	–	17	.433	34	–	21	.618
Pittsburgh ‍‍‍	10	–	18	.357	25	–	26	.490
Virginia Tech ‍‍‍	6	–	24	.200	19	–	36	.345
x – Division champion ‡ – Tournament champion y – Invited to the NCAA tournament As of June 4, 2016; Rankings from Collegiate Baseball

The 2016 Florida State Seminoles baseball team represented Florida State University during the 2016 NCAA Division I baseball season. The Seminoles played their home games at Mike Martin Field at Dick Howser Stadium as a member of the Atlantic Coast Conference. They were led by head coach Mike Martin, in his 37th season at Florida State. It was the Seminoles' 25th season as a member of the ACC and its 11th in the ACC's Atlantic Division.

Florida State entered the season as the defending ACC champion and finished the season as ACC runner-up.

The Seminoles reached the post-season for the thirty-ninth straight year (the second longest active streak) and were selected as the sixteenth overall seed in the NCAA tournament, hosting for the sixth consecutive season.

== Previous season ==
In 2015, the Seminoles finished the season with a record of 44–21, 17–13 in conference play, winning the ACC tournament. The Seminoles qualified for the NCAA tournament. They were hosts of the Tallahassee Regional and advanced to the Gainesville Super Regional where they were eliminated by Florida.

== Preseason ==
In the ACC Media Poll, Florida State was picked to finish third in the Atlantic Division.

== Personnel ==
=== Roster ===
2016 Florida State Seminoles roster
Pitchers: 5 - Matthew Kinney - (redshirt) Senior; 6 - Cobi Johnson - Sophomore; 7 - Steven Wells Jr. - Sophomore; 9 - Andy Ward - (redshirt) Sophomore; 14 - Tyler Holton - Freshman; 16 - Taylor Blatch - (redshirt) Sophomore; 17 - Mike Compton - (redshirt) Senior; 18 - Ed Voyles - (redshirt) Sophomore; 19 - Andrew Karp - (redshirt) Freshman; 23 - Tyler Warmoth - (redshirt) Senior; 25 - Ronnie Ramirez - Freshman; 26 - Cole Sands - Freshman; 30 - Will Zirzow - (redshirt) Sophomore; 31 - Alec Byrd - Junior; 33 - Chase Haney - Freshman; 36 - Dillon Brown - Freshman; 38 - Alex Deise - (redshirt) Junior; 42 - Jim Voyles - Junior; 44 - Jared Middleton - Freshman; 46 - Drew Carlton - Sophomore	Catchers: 20 - Gage West - Junior; 35 - Cal Raleigh - Freshman; 53 - Bryan Bussey - Junior; Infielders: 3 - Darren Miller - Sophomore; 10 - Taylor Walls - Sophomore; 12 - John Sansone - Senior; 15 - Hank Truluck - Junior; 24 - Matt Henderson - Junior; 28 - Dylan Busby - Sophomore; 29 - Quincy Nieporte - Junior; 32 - Hayden Kelly - Senior	Outfielders: 1 - Nick Graganella - (redshirt) Senior; 2 - Jackson Lueck - Freshman; 13 - Donovan Petrey - Freshman; 21 - Ben DeLuzio - Junior

=== Coaching staff ===
2016 Florida State Seminoles baseball coaching staff
- 11 - Mike Martin – Head coach – 37th season
- 22 - Mike Bell – Associate head coach / Pitchers - 5th season
- 4 - Mike Martin, Jr. – Assistant coach/recruiting coordinator - 19th season

== Schedule ==
2016 Florida State Seminoles baseball game log
Regular season
February

Date	Opponent	Rank	Site/stadium	Score	Win	Loss	Save	Attendance	Overall Record	ACC Record
Feb 19	Rhode Island*	#16	Dick Howser Stadium • Tallahassee, FL	**W** 19–1	**Compton** (1–0)	Moyers (0–1)		4,375	1–0	–
Feb 20	Rhode Island*	#16	Dick Howser Stadium • Tallahassee, FL	**W** 8–1	**Carlton** (1–0)	Wilson (0–1)	**Holton** (1)	5,580	2–0	–
Feb 21	Rhode Island*	#16	Dick Howser Stadium • Tallahassee, FL	**W** 23–4	**Sands** (1–0)	Wessel (0–1)		4,382	3–0	–
Feb 26	College of Charleston*	#11	Dick Howser Stadium • Tallahassee, FL	**L** 1–2	Helvey (1–0)	**Compton** (1–1)	Love (1)	4,267	3–1	–
Feb 27	College of Charleston*	#11	Dick Howser Stadium • Tallahassee, FL	**W** 8–3	**Carlton** (2–0)	Ober (0–1)		4,751	4–1	–
Feb 28	College of Charleston*	#11	Dick Howser Stadium • Tallahassee, FL	**W** 11–2	**Sands** (2–0)	McCutcheon (1–1)		4,401	5–1	–

March

Date	Opponent	Rank	Site/stadium	Score	Win	Loss	Save	Attendance	Overall Record	ACC Record
Mar 1	Jacksonville*	#11	Dick Howser Stadium • Tallahassee, FL	**L** 3–7	Baumann (1–0)	**Holton** (0–1)	Cassala (1)	3,802	5–2	–
Mar 2	Villanova*	#11	Dick Howser Stadium • Tallahassee, FL	**W** 11–10^{14}	**Zirzow** (1–0)	Fradella (0–1)		3,659	6–2	–
Mar 4	St. John's*	#11	Dick Howser Stadium • Tallahassee, FL	**W** 16–4	**Compton** (2–1)	Christopher (0–1)		3,895	7–2	–
Mar 5	St. John's*	#11	Dick Howser Stadium • Tallahassee, FL	**W** 9–2	**Carlton** (3–0)	Nellis (0–2)		4,039	8–2	–
Mar 6	St. John's*	#11	Dick Howser Stadium • Tallahassee, FL	**L** 1–5	McAuliffe (1–0)	**Sands** (2–1)	Hackimer (2)	4,007	8–3	–
Mar 8	at USF*	#14	USF Baseball Stadium • Tampa, FL	**W** 12–4	**Haney** (1–0)	Clarkson (0–1)		2,431	9–3	–
Mar 9	Toledo*	#14	Dick Howser Stadium • Tallahassee, FL	**W** 3–2	**Voyles, J.** (1–0)	Jacob (0–2)		3,147	10–3	–
Mar 11	#9 Georgia Tech	#14	Dick Howser Stadium • Tallahassee, FL	**W** 8–2	**Compton** (3–1)	Gold (1–1)		3,792	11–3	1–0
Mar 12	#9 Georgia Tech	#14	Dick Howser Stadium • Tallahassee, FL	**W** 14–9	**Haney** (2–0)	Dulaney (1–1)		4,068	12–3	2–0
Mar 13	#9 Georgia Tech	#14	Dick Howser Stadium • Tallahassee, FL	**W** 8–3	**Sands** (3–1)	Hughes (3–1)		3,948	13–3	3–0
Mar 15	at #1 Florida*	#9	Alfred A. McKethan Stadium • Gainesville, FL	**L** 0–6	Dunning (2–0)	**Holton** (0–2)		5,917	13–4	–
Mar 18	at Pittsburgh	#9	Petersen Sports Complex • Pittsburgh, PA	**W** 17–4	**Kinney** (1–0)	Falk (2–1)	**Voyles, E.** (1)	580	14–4	4–0
Mar 19	at Pittsburgh	#9	Petersen Sports Complex • Pittsburgh, PA	**W** 10–2	**Carlton** (4–0)	Sandefur (1–2)	**Voyles, J.** (1)	500	15–4	5–0
Mar 20	at Pittsburgh	#9	Petersen Sports Complex • Pittsburgh, PA	**L** 2–5	Zeuch (1–0)	**Sands** (3–2)	Mattson (1)	208	15–5	5–1
Mar 22	UCF*	#14	Dick Howser Stadium • Tallahassee, FL	**W** 7–2	**Voyles, J.** (2–0)	Pimentel (0–4)		4,426	16–5	–
Mar 23	UCF*	#14	Dick Howser Stadium • Tallahassee, FL	**W** 5–4^{11}	**Haney** (3–0)	Hukari (1–2)		3,920	17–5	–
Mar 25	#19 NC State	#14	Dick Howser Stadium • Tallahassee, FL	**W** 8–5	**Kinney** (2–0)	O'Donnell (3–2)	**Warmoth** (1)	3,953	18–5	6–1
Mar 26	#19 NC State	#14	Dick Howser Stadium • Tallahassee, FL	Cancelled						
Mar 27	#19 NC State	#14	Dick Howser Stadium • Tallahassee, FL	Cancelled						
Mar 29	vs. #1 Florida*	#8	Baseball Grounds of Jacksonville • Jacksonville, FL	**L** 2–3	Kowar (3–0)	**Carlton** (4–1)	Anderson (4)	9,035	18–6	–

April

Date	Opponent	Rank	Site/stadium	Score	Win	Loss	Save	Attendance	Overall Record	ACC Record
Apr 1	at Boston College	#8	Eddie Pellagrini Diamond at John Shea Field • Chestnut Hill, MA	**W** 3–0	**Compton** (4–1)	King (4–2)	**Warmoth** (2)	314	19–6	7–1
Apr 2	at Boston College	#8	Eddie Pellagrini Diamond at John Shea Field • Chestnut Hill, MA	Cancelled						
Apr 3	at Boston College	#8	Eddie Pellagrini Diamond at John Shea Field • Chestnut Hill, MA	Cancelled						
Apr 5	#19 Texas Tech	#5	Dick Howser Stadium • Tallahassee, FL	**W** 10–1	**Voyles, J.** (3–0)	Lanning (1–3)		4,002	20–6	–
Apr 6	#19 Texas Tech	#5	Dick Howser Stadium • Tallahassee, FL	**L** 4–8	Dugger (2–0)	Sands (3–3)	Howard (3)	3,821	20–7	–
Apr 8	#4 Louisville	#5	Dick Howser Stadium • Tallahassee, FL	**W** 12–7	**Kinney** (3–0)	Sparger (0–1)		4,495	21–7	8–1
Apr 9	#4 Louisville	#5	Dick Howser Stadium • Tallahassee, FL	**L** 1–7	Harrington (7–1)	**Carlton** (4–2)		5,539	21–8	8–2
Apr 10	#4 Louisville	#5	Dick Howser Stadium • Tallahassee, FL	**W** 16–5	**Voyles, J.** (4–0)	Funkhouser (3–3)		4,212	22–8	9–2
Apr 12	#3 Florida*	#4	Dick Howser Stadium • Tallahassee, FL	**L** 2–8	Rubio (2–0)	**Voyles, E.** (0–1)		5,936	22–9	–
Apr 15	at Wake Forest	#4	Gene Hooks Field • Winston-Salem, NC	**L** 0–9	Dunshee (5–3)	**Compton** (4–2)		1,046	22–10	9–3
Apr 16	at Wake Forest	#4	Gene Hooks Field • Winston-Salem, NC	**W** 13–8	**Voyles, J.** (5–0)	McCarren (3–2)		1,218	23–10	10–3
Apr 17	at Wake Forest	#4	Gene Hooks Field • Winston-Salem, NC	**L** 2–4	Johnstone (2–3)	**Sands** (3–4)	Craig (5)	1,163	23–11	10–4
Apr 19	Stetson*	#9	Dick Howser Stadium • Tallahassee, FL	**W** 8–5	**Holton** (1–2)	Gonzalez (3–1)	**Warmoth** (3)	4,013	24–11	–
Apr 20	Stetson*	#9	Dick Howser Stadium • Tallahassee, FL	**W** 8–6	**Karp** (1–0)	Schaly (1–3)		3,822	25–11	–
Apr 22	#29 Notre Dame	#9	Dick Howser Stadium • Tallahassee, FL	**W** 12–6	**Compton** (5–2)	Solomon (3–4)		3,957	26–11	11–4
Apr 23	#29 Notre Dame	#9	Dick Howser Stadium • Tallahassee, FL	**W** 7–6^{12}	**Haney** (4–0)	Vierling (2–1)		5,147	27–11	12–4
Apr 24	#29 Notre Dame	#9	Dick Howser Stadium • Tallahassee, FL	**W** 11–6	**Holton** (2–2)	Bass (1–1)		4,278	28–11	13–4
Apr 30	at Clemson	#3	Doug Kingsmore Stadium • Clemson, SC	**L** 3–10	Eubanks (3–4)	**Compton** (5–3)		5,304	28–12	13–5

May

Date	Opponent	Rank	Site/stadium	Score	Win	Loss	Save	Attendance	Overall Record	ACC Record
May 1	at Clemson	#3	Doug Kingsmore Stadium • Clemson, SC	**W** 11–2	**Carlton** (5–2)	Schmidt (5–3)		4,196	29–12	14–5
May 2	at Clemson	#3	Doug Kingsmore Stadium • Clemson, SC	**L** 3–7	Krall (7–1)	**Holton** (2–3)		3,331	29–13	14–6
May 6	Bowling Green*	#4	Dick Howser Stadium • Tallahassee, FL	**W** 6–1	**Voyles, E.** (1–1)	Daugherty (4–2)		3,737	30–13	–
May 7	Bowling Green*	#4	Dick Howser Stadium • Tallahassee, FL	**W** 10–0	**Carlton** (6–2)	Carey (3–8)		4,179	31–13	–
May 8	Bowling Green*	#4	Dick Howser Stadium • Tallahassee, FL	**W** 6–1	**Sands** (4–4)	Lacinak (2–7)		3,733	32–13	–
May 10	at Jacksonville*	#4	John Sessions Stadium • Jacksonville, FL	**L** 2–6	Tanner (3–0)	**Karp** (1–1)		337	32–14	–
May 11	Florida Gulf Coast*	#4	Dick Howser Stadium • Tallahassee, FL	**L** 8–11	Knoblauch (5–0)	**Warmoth** (0–1)			32–15	–
May 13	at Duke	#4	Jack Coombs Field • Durham, NC	**L** 4–5	Urbon (7–1)	**Carlton** (6–3)	Stallings (8)	617	32–16	14–7
May 14	at Duke	#4	Jack Coombs Field • Durham, NC	**L** 1–3	Swart (3–2)	**Sands** (4–5)		814	32–17	14–8
May 15	at Duke	#4	Jack Coombs Field • Durham, NC	**W** 4–3	**Voyles, J.** (6–0)	McAfee (7–4)	**Warmoth** (4)	727	33–17	15–8
May 17	at Stetson*	#8	Melching Field at Conrad Park • DeLand, FL	Cancelled						
May 19	#2 Miami (FL)	#8	Dick Howser Stadium • Tallahassee, FL	**L** 2–4	Meyer (1–0)	**Voyles, J.** (6–1)	Garcia (13)	4,156	33–18	15–9
May 21	#2 Miami (FL)	#8	Dick Howser Stadium • Tallahassee, FL	**L** 5–8	Mediavilla (10–1)	**Sands** (4–6)	Garcia (14)	5,024	33–19	15–10
May 21	#2 Miami (FL)	#8	Dick Howser Stadium • Tallahassee, FL	**W** 3–2^{10}	**Warmoth** (1–1)	Guerra (1–1)		5,024	34–19	16–10

Postseason
ACC Tournament

Date	Opponent	Rank	Site/stadium	Score	Win	Loss	Save	Attendance	Overall Record	ACCT Record
May 25	vs. #13 (5) NC State	#11 (4)	Durham Bulls Athletic Park • Durham, NC	**W** 7–3	**Haney** (5–0)	Gilbert (3–1)		3,409	35–19	1–0
May 26	vs. (9) Georgia Tech	#11 (4)	Durham Bulls Athletic Park • Durham, NC	**W** 6–1	**Sands** (5–6)	Ryan (3–3)		2,504	36–19	2–0
May 28	vs. #2 (1) Miami (FL)	#11 (4)	Durham Bulls Athletic Park • Durham, NC	**W** 5–4	**Byrd** (1–0)	Meyer (1–1)		4,754	37–19	3–0
May 29	vs. #28 (6) Clemson	#11 (4)	Durham Bulls Athletic Park • Durham, NC (Championship)	**L** 13–18	Bostic (4–2)	**Voyles, E.** (1–2)		4,863	37–20	3–1

NCAA tournament

Date	Opponent	Rank	Site/stadium	Score	Win	Loss	Save	Attendance	Overall Record	NCAAT Record
Jun 3	(4) Alabama State	#12 (1)	Dick Howser Stadium • Tallahassee, FL (Tallahassee Regional)	**W** 18–6	**Carlton** (7–3)	Camacho (10–1)		3,276	38–20	1–0
Jun 4	#24 (2) Southern Miss	#12 (1)	Dick Howser Stadium • Tallahassee, FL (Tallahassee Regional)	**W** 7–2	**Holton** (3–3)	Cockrell (7–2)	**Voyles, J.** (2)	3,496	39–20	2–0
Jun 5	(3) South Alabama	#12 (1)	Dick Howser Stadium • Tallahassee, FL (Tallahassee Regional Final)	**W** 18–6	**Sands** (6–6)	Soleymani (4–4)		2,592	40–20	3–0
Jun 11	#2 (1) Florida	#9 (16)	Alfred A. McKethan Stadium • Gainesville, FL (Gainesville Super Regional)	**W** 3–0	**Carlton** (8–3)	Faedo (13–2)		5,768	41–20	4–0
Jun 12	#2 (1) Florida	#9 (16)	Alfred A. McKethan Stadium • Gainesville, FL (Gainesville Super Regional)	**L** 0–5	Shore (12–0)	**Holton** (3–4)		5,326	41–21	4–1
Jun 13	#2 (1) Florida	#9 (16)	Alfred A. McKethan Stadium • Gainesville, FL (Gainesville Super Regional Final)	**L** 0–7	Dunning (6–3)	**Sands** (6–7)		4,475	41–22	4–2

Legend: = Win = Loss = Postponement
Bold = Florida State team member
Rankings from Collegiate Baseball; parenthesis indicate tournament seedings.

== Rankings ==
Ranking movements Legend: ██ Increase in ranking ██ Decrease in ranking
	Week																		
Poll	Pre	1	2	3	4	5	6	7	8	9	10	11	12	13	14	15	16	17	Final
Coaches'	14	14*	14	15	11	11	8	8	6	10	6	8	6	12	13	12	12*	12*	13
Baseball America	17	16	15	15	13	12	12	11	6	11	5	5	7	14	18	13	13*	13*	13
Collegiate Baseball^	16	11	11	14	9	14	8	5	4	9	3	4	4	8	11	12	9	14	14
NCBWA†	14	10	9	11	8	10	7	7	5	9	5	7	6	11	15	13	13*	10	13

^ Collegiate Baseball ranked 40 teams in their preseason poll, but only ranked 30 teams weekly during the season.
† NCBWA ranks 30 teams in their preseason poll, but only ranks 25 teams weekly during the season.
* A new poll was not released for this week, so for comparison purposes, the previous week's ranking is inserted in this week's slot.

== Awards ==
=== Watchlists ===
- NCBWA Stopper of the Year Award

Matthew Kinney
Tyler Warmoth

- National Pitcher of the Year Award

Jim Voyles

- Brooks Wallace Award

Taylor Walls

==== Finalists ====
- Dick Howser Trophy

John Sansone
Taylor Walls

== Honors ==
- Regional MVP
  - Dylan Busby
- ACC Player of the Week
  - John Sansone
  - Quincy Nieporte
- National Player of the Week
  - Quincy Nieporte

All-ACC

- First Team
  - John Sansone
- Second Team
  - Taylor Walls
- Freshman Team
  - Cal Raleigh

All-Americans

- Louisville Slugger
  - Third Team
    - John Sansone
  - Freshman Team
    - Cal Raleigh
- Baseball America
  - First Team
    - Taylor Walls
  - Freshman Team
    - Tyler Holton
    - Cal Raleigh
- National Collegiate Baseball Writers Association
  - Third Team
    - Taylor Walls
  - First Team (Freshman)
    - Cal Raleigh
- D1 Baseball
  - Third Team
    - Taylor Walls
- Perfect Game
  - Honorable Mention
    - Taylor Walls
  - First Team (Freshman)
    - Cal Raleigh

=== All-Star games ===
Taylor Walls and Cole Sands were named to the USA Baseball Collegiate National Team.

Game	Site	Player
7th College Home Run Derby	TD Ameritrade Park, Omaha, Nebraska	Dylan Busby

== MLB draft ==
One player was selected in the 2016 MLB draft.

Round	Overall Pick	Name	Position	Team
8th	228	John Sansone	Infielder	Cincinnati Reds
