= 2016 Texas Tech Red Raiders baseball team =

American college baseball season

2016 Texas Tech Red Raiders baseball

Big 12 Conference Regular season Champions NCAA Lubbock Regional champions NCAA Lubbock Super Regional champions

College World Series
- Conference: Big 12 Conference

Ranking
- Coaches: No. 11
- Record: 47–19 (19–5 Big 12)
- Head coach: Tim Tadlock (4th season)
- Assistant coaches: Ray Hayward (4th season); J-Bob Thomas (4th season); Matt Gardner (4th season)
- Captain: Eric Gutierrez
- Home stadium: Dan Law Field at Rip Griffin Park

2016 Big 12 Conference baseball standings
	Conf.						Overall
Team	W		L		T	PCT	W		L		T	PCT
No. 5 Texas Tech ‍†‍‍^{y}	19	–	5	–	0	.792	47	–	20	–	0	.701
No. 4 Oklahoma State ‍‍‍^{y}	16	–	8	–	0	.667	43	–	22	–	0	.662
No. 3 TCU ‍‍‡‍^{y}	15	–	9	–	0	.625	49	–	18	–	0	.731
West Virginia ‍‍‍	12	–	11	–	0	.522	36	–	22	–	0	.621
Oklahoma ‍‍‍	11	–	13	–	0	.458	30	–	27	–	1	.526
Baylor ‍‍‍	10	–	14	–	0	.417	24	–	29	–	0	.453
Texas ‍‍‍	10	–	14	–	0	.417	25	–	32	–	0	.439
Kansas State ‍‍‍	8	–	16	–	0	.333	26	–	31	–	0	.456
Kansas ‍‍‍	6	–	17	–	0	.261	20	–	35	–	1	.366
† – Conference champion ‡ – Tournament champion y – Invited to the NCAA tournament Rankings from Collegiate Baseball

The 2016 Texas Tech Red Raiders baseball team represented Texas Tech University during the 2016 NCAA Division I baseball season. The Red Raiders played their home games at Dan Law Field at Rip Griffin Park as a member of the Big 12 Conference. They were led by head coach Tim Tadlock, in his 4th season at Texas Tech.

== Previous season ==
The 2015 Texas Tech Red Raiders baseball team notched a 31–24 (13–11) regular season record and finished third in the Big 12 Conference standings. The Red Raiders reached the 2015 Big 12 Conference baseball tournament championship game, where they were eliminated in the second round. Texas Tech did not receive an at-large bid to the 2015 NCAA Division I baseball tournament.

== Personnel ==
=== Roster ===
2016 Texas Tech Red Raiders roster
Pitchers: 13 - Dalton Brown (RHP) - Senior; 14 - Chandler Eden (RHP) - Junior; 21 - Erikson Lanning (LHP) - Freshman; 28 - Ty Harpenau (RHP) - Freshman; 30 - Davis Martin (RHP) - Freshman; 34 - Ryan Shetter (RHP) - Freshman; 36 - Ty Damron (LHP) - Junior; 37 - Jonathan Nicholson (RHP) - Freshman; 39 - Robert Dugger (RHP) - Junior; 41 - Dylan Dusek (LHP) - Junior; 42 - Parker Mushinski (LHP) - Sophomore; 43 - Garrett Bruce (RHP) - (redshirt) Junior; 44 - Ryan Moseley (RHP) - Junior; 45 - Hayden Howard (LHP) - Junior; 46 - Tanner Buxton (RHP) - Junior; 47 - Steven Gingery (LHP) - Freshman; 48 - Sean Thompson (RHP) - Junior; 55 - Jacob Patterson (LHP) - Sophomore	Catchers: 15 - Kholeton Sanchez - Senior; 16 - Tyler Floyd - Senior; 35 - Matt Bernstein - Freshman; 51 - Braden Williams - Freshman; Infielders: 2 - Orlando Garcia - Sophomore; 3 - Michael Davis - Sophomore; 4 - Cory Raley - Senior; 7 - Ryan Long - Junior; 8 - Tanner Gardner - Sophomore; 9 - Trey Ochoa - Freshman; 12 - Eric Gutierrez - Senior; 20 - Tyler Fowler - Freshman; 25 - Hunter Hargrove - Junior; 42 - Parker Mushinski - Sophomore	Outfielders: 1 - Cody Farhat - Freshman; 8 - Tanner Gardner - Sophomore; 10 - Tyler Neslony - Senior; 11 - Stephen Smith - Junior; 17 - Zach Davis - Senior; 25 - Hunter Hargrove - Junior; 29 - Anthony Lyons - Junior

=== Coaching staff ===
Name	Position	Seasons at Texas Tech	Alma mater
Tim Tadlock	Head coach	4	Texas Tech University (1992)
Ray Hayward	Pitching Coach	4	University of Oklahoma (1983)
J-Bob Thomas	Assistant coach & RecruitingCoordinator	4	Abilene Christian University (2005)
Matt Gardner	Volunteer Assistant Coach	4	Oklahoma State University (2008)

== Schedule and results ==
2016 Texas Tech Red Raiders baseball game log
Regular season
February

Date	Time (CT)	TV	Opponent	Rank	Site/stadium	Score	Win	Loss	Save	Attendance	Overall	Big 12
February 19	2:00 pm	FSSW+	Milwaukee*	#39	Dan Law Field at Rip Griffin Park • Lubbock, TX	**W** 12–3	**Moseley** (1–0)	Schulfer (0–1)	–	4,070	1–0	–
February 20	12:00 pm		Milwaukee*	#39	Dan Law Field at Rip Griffin Park • Lubbock, TX	**L** 3–10	Tuttle (1–0)	**Gingery** (0–1)	Sommers (1)	4,176	1–1	–
February 20	4:00 pm		Milwaukee*	#39	Dan Law Field at Rip Griffin Park • Lubbock, TX	**W** 9–1	**Damron** (1–0)	Reuss (0–1)	**Martin** (1)	4,176	2–1	–
February 21	12:00 pm		Milwaukee*	#39	Dan Law Field at Rip Griffin Park • Lubbock, TX	**W** 12–0	**Lanning** (1–0)	Keller (0–1)	–	3,097	3–1	–
February 24	6:30 pm		at Sam Houston State*		Don Sanders Stadium • Huntsville, TX	**W** 11–6	**Martin** (1–0)	Mills (0–1)	–	1,108	4–1	–
February 26	12:00 pm	MLBN; RSSW	#16 Houston*		Minute Maid Park • Houston, TX (Shiners Hospitals for Children College Classic)	**W** 3–2	**Howard** (1–0)	Lantrip (0–1)	**Martin** (2)	5,628	5–1	–
February 27	12:00 pm	MLBN; RSSW	#6 Louisiana–Lafayette*		Minute Maid Park • Houston, TX (Shiners Hospitals for Children College Classic)	**W** 5–3^{10}	**Shetter** (1–0)	Moore (1–1)	–	7,881	6–1	–
February 28	11:00 am	MLB; RSSW	#24 Arkansas*		Minute Maid Park • Houston, TX (Shiners Hospitals for Children College Classic)	**L** 6–10	Chadwick (1–0)	**Howard** (1–1)	–	6,516	6–2	–

March

Date	Time (CT)	TV	Opponent	Rank	Site/stadium	Score	Win	Loss	Save	Attendance	Overall	Big 12
March 1	6:30 pm		New Mexico State*		Dan Law Field at Rip Griffin Park • Lubbock, TX	**L** 6–7	Butts (1–0)	**Lanning** (1–1)	Butcher (1)	3,453	6–3	–
March 2	2:00 pm		New Mexico State*		Dan Law Field at Rip Griffin Park • Lubbock, TX	**W** 14–2	**Gingery** (1–1)	Reyes (0–1)	–	2,922	7–3	–
March 4	6:30 pm	FSSW+	#29 Cal State Fullerton*		Dan Law Field at Rip Griffin Park • Lubbock, TX	**L** 3–7	Quinn (2–1)	**Moseley** (1–1)	–	4,191	7–4	–
March 5	2:00 pm		#29 Cal State Fullerton*		Dan Law Field at Rip Griffin Park • Lubbock, TX	**W** 6–5	**Howard** (2–1)	Seabold (0–1)	**Dugger** (1)	3,557	8–4	–
March 6	12:30 pm	FSSW+	#29 Cal State Fullerton*		Dan Law Field at Rip Griffin Park • Lubbock, TX	**L** 1–4	Eastman (3–0)	**Damron** (1–1)	Hockin (2)	3,505	8–5	–
March 11	9:00 pm		at #18 California*		Evans Diamond • Berkeley, CA	**L** 2–9	Jefferies (4–0)	**Lanning** (1–2)	–	509	8–6	–
March 12	4:00 pm		at #18 California*		Evans Diamond • Berkeley, CA	**W** 11–8	**Howard** (3–1)	Dodson (0–2)	–	575	9–6	–
March 15	7:00 pm		Texas–Arlington*		Globe Life Park • Arlington, TX	**W** 6–4	**Moseley** (2–1)	Michalski (0–1)	**Dugger** (2)	4,033	10–6	–
March 18	4:05 pm	FSSW	at Baylor		Baylor Ballpark • Waco, TX	**W** 5–0	**Martin** (2–0)	Castano (2–2)	–	2,328	11–6	1–0
March 19	3:00 pm	FCSC	at Baylor		Baylor Ballpark • Waco, TX	**L** 3–4	Ott; 2–2	**Moseley** (2–2)	Montemayor (4)	3,523	11–7	1–1
March 20	1:00 pm	FSSW+	at Baylor		Baylor Ballpark • Waco, TX	**W** 6–5	**Howard** (4–1)	Lewis (0–3)	**Dugger** (3)	2,377	12–7	2–1
March 22	2:00 pm		New Mexico*		Dan Law Field at Rip Griffin Park • Lubbock, TX	**W** 14–10	**Shetter** (2–0)	Tripp (0–1)	–	2,757	13–7	–
March 24	6:30 pm	FSSW+	Oklahoma		Dan Law Field at Rip Griffin Park • Lubbock, TX	**W** 5–0	**Martin** (3–0)	A. Hansen (0–4)	**Howard** (1)	3,231	14–7	3–1
March 25	6:30 pm		Oklahoma		Dan Law Field at Rip Griffin Park • Lubbock, TX	**W** 6–1	**Gingery** (2–1)	Andritsos (3–2)	–	4,014	15–7	4–1
March 26	2:00 pm		Oklahoma		Dan Law Field at Rip Griffin Park • Lubbock, TX	**W** 13–7	**Howard** (5–1)	Berry (0–2)	**Moseley** (1)	4,432	16–7	5–1
March 28	8:05 pm		at UNLV*	#29	Earl Wilson Stadium • Paradise, NV	**L** 5–8	Wilson (1–2)	**Shetter** (2–1)	Wright (5)	336	16–8	–
March 29	4:05 pm		at UNLV*	#29	Earl Wilson Stadium • Paradise, NV	**W** 14–6	**Damron** (2–1)	Myers (0–2)	–	436	17–8	–

April

Date	Time (CT)	TV	Opponent	Rank	Site/stadium	Score	Win	Loss	Save	Attendance	Overall	Big 12
April 2	1:00 pm		Kansas State	#29	Dan Law Field at Rip Griffin Park • Lubbock, TX	**W** 10–3	**Martin** (4–0)	MaVorhis (3–2)	**Shetter** (1)	4,145	18–8	6–1
April 2	4:15 pm		Kansas State	#29	Dan Law Field at Rip Griffin Park • Lubbock, TX	**W** 10–4	**Gingery** (3–1)	Rigler (2–5)	**Howard** (2)	4,145	19–8	7–1
April 3	12:00 pm		Kansas State	#29	Dan Law Field at Rip Griffin Park • Lubbock, TX	**W** 6–5	**Dugger** (1–0)	Fischer (1–3)	**Moseley** (2)	3,655	20–8	8–1
April 5	5:00 pm		at #5 Florida State*	#19	Mike Martin Field at Dick Howser Stadium • Tallahassee, FL	**L** 1–10	Voyles (3–0)	**Lanning** (1–3)	–	4,002	20–9	–
April 6	5:00 pm	ESPN3	at #5 Florida State*	#19	Mike Martin Field at Dick Howser Stadium • Tallahassee, FL	**W** 8–4	**Dugger** (2–0)	Sands (3–3)	**Howard** (3)	3,821	21–9	–
April 8	6:00 pm	FSSW+ FCSP	at Oklahoma State	#19	Reynolds Stadium • Stillwater, OK	**W** 5–1	**Moseley** (3–2)	Hatch (2–1)	–	1,977	22–9	9–1
April 9	3:00 pm	Cox OK	at Oklahoma State	#19	Reynolds Stadium • Stillwater, OK	**W** 8–2	**Dugger** (3–0)	Cobb (3–5)	–	2,855	23–9	10–1
April 10	1:00 pm	FCSP	at Oklahoma State	#19	Reynolds Stadium • Stillwater, OK	**W** 15–5^{7}	**Harpenau** (1–0)	Elliott (3–2)	–	1,258	24–9	11–1
April 13	2:00 pm		Sam Houston State*	#10	Dan Law Field at Rip Griffin Park • Lubbock, TX	**W** 8–6	**Lanning** (2–3)	Rahm (0–3)	**Howard** (4)	3,176	25–9	–
April 13	5:15 pm		Sam Houston State*	#10	Dan Law Field at Rip Griffin Park • Lubbock, TX	**W** 20–3	**Damron** (3–1)	Brown (0–4)	–	3,176	26–9	–
April 15	12:00 pm		San Diego State*	#10	Dan Law Field at Rip Griffin Park • Lubbock, TX (Brooks Wallace Memorial Series)	**W** 3–1	**Martin** (5–0)	Pyatt (0–3)	**Howard** (5)	2,891	27–9	–
April 16	12:00 pm		San Diego State*	#10	Dan Law Field at Rip Griffin Park • Lubbock, TX (Brooks Wallace Memorial Series)	**W** 10–0	**Shetter** (3–1)	Reyes (0–4)	–	4,050	28–9	–
April 17	11:30 am		San Diego State*	#10	Dan Law Field at Rip Griffin Park • Lubbock, TX (Brooks Wallace Memorial Series)	**W** 7–2	**Moseley** (4–2)	Thompson (1–6)	–	3,330	29–9	–
April 19	7:00 pm	Comcast 26	at New Mexico*	#7	Santa Ana Star Field • Albuquerque, NM	**W** 7–4	**Howard** (6–1)	Sanchez (0–4)	–	614	30–9	–
April 20	2:00 pm	Comcast 26	at New Mexico*	#7	Santa Ana Star Field • Albuquerque, NM	**L** 5–6^{10}	Estrella (2–1)	**Brown** (0–1)	–	811	30–10	–
April 22	6:30 pm	FSSW+	Texas	#7	Dan Law Field at Rip Griffin Park • Lubbock, TX	**W** 13–6	**Martin** (6–0)	Dunbar (0–1)	–	4,432	31–10	12–1
April 23	2:00 pm	FSSW+	Texas	#7	Dan Law Field at Rip Griffin Park • Lubbock, TX	**L** 4–7	Culbreth (8–2)	**Moseley** (4–3)	Kingham (2)	4,432	31–11	12–2
April 24	2:00 pm	FSSW+	Texas	#7	Dan Law Field at Rip Griffin Park • Lubbock, TX	**L** 1–17^{7}	Johnston (3–1)	**Howard** (6–2)	–	4,432	31–12	12–3
April 26	6:30 pm		at Abilene Christian*	#10	Crutcher Scott Field • Abilene, TX	Game cancelled due to weather. Later rescheduled for May 10 after Oral Roberts game got cancelled.						
April 27	6:30 pm		vs. Abilene Christian*	#10	Security Bank Ballpark • Midland, TX	**W** 5–4	**Howard** (7–2)	Lambright (0–1)	–	4,268	32–12	–
April 29	8:00 pm	FS1	at #11 TCU	#10	Lupton Stadium • Fort Worth, TX	**W** 7–3	**Martin** (7–0)	Trieglaff (4–1)	–	4,564	33–12	13–3
April 30	4:00 pm	FSSW	at #11 TCU	#10	Lupton Stadium • Fort Worth, TX	**L** 6–13	Guillory (1–1)	**Moseley** (4–4)	–	6,451	33–13	13–4

May

Date	Time (CT)	TV	Opponent	Rank	Site/stadium	Score	Win	Loss	Save	Attendance	Overall	Big 12
May 1	1:00 pm		at #11 TCU	#10	Lupton Stadium • Fort Worth, TX	**W** 3–1	**Damron** (4–1)	Hill (2–3)	**Mushinski** (1)	5,829	34–13	14–4
May 6	6:00 pm	ESPN3	at Kansas	#10	Hoglund Ballpark • Lawrence, KS	**W** 10–3	**Martin** (8–0)	Krauth (4–5)	–	1,108	35–13	15–4
May 7	2:00 pm	ESPN3	at Kansas	#10	Hoglund Ballpark • Lawrence, KS	**W** 9–2	**Gingery** (4–1)	Goddard (2–5)	–	1,201	36–13	16–4
May 8	1:00 pm	ESPN3	at Kansas	#10	Hoglund Ballpark • Lawrence, KS	**W** 6–3	**Moseley** (5–4)	Weiman (2–6)	**Howard** (6)	905	37–13	17–4
May 10	1:00 pm		vs. Oral Roberts*	#9	Dr Pepper Ballpark • Frisco, TX	Game cancelled due to projected weather, replaced with at Abilene Christian						
May 10	6:30 pm		at Abilene Christian*	#9	Crutcher Scott Field • Abilene, TX	**W** 7–2	**Moseley** (6–4)	Lambright (0–2)	–	1,064	38–13	–
May 19	6:30 pm	FSSW	West Virginia	#7	Dan Law Field at Rip Griffin Park • Lubbock, TX	**W** 2–1	**Howard** (8–2)	Grove (2–4)	**Moseley** (3)	3,966	39–13	18–4
May 20	2:00 pm		West Virginia	#7	Dan Law Field at Rip Griffin Park • Lubbock, TX	**W** 4–2	**Dugger** (4–0)	Donato (3–4)	**Moseley** (4)	3,842	40–13	19–4
May 21	2:00 pm		West Virginia	#7	Dan Law Field at Rip Griffin Park • Lubbock, TX	**L** 7–8	Smith (4–1)	**Howard** (8–3)	–	4,432	40–14	19–5

Postseason
Big 12 Tournament

Date	Time (CT)	TV	Opponent	Rank	Site/stadium	Score	Win	Loss	Save	Attendance	Overall	Big 12 Tourn.
May 25	12:30 pm	FCSC; FSSW+	Kansas State	#7	Chickasaw Bricktown Ballpark • Oklahoma City, OK	**W** 8–5	**Dugger** (5–0)	Erickson (2–1)	**Howard** (7)	4,047	41–14	1–0
May 26	4:00 pm	FCSC; FSSW+	West Virginia	#7	Chickasaw Bricktown Ballpark • Oklahoma City, OK	**L** 4–9	Smith (5–1)	**Shetter** (3–2)	–	4,064	41–15	1–1
May 27	3:15 pm	FCSC; FSSW+	Oklahoma	#7	Chickasaw Bricktown Ballpark • Oklahoma City, OK	**L** 4–17^{7}	Grove (2–1)	**Gingery** (4–2)	–	5,104	41–16	1–2

NCAA tournament

Date	Time (CT)	TV	Opponent	Rank	Site/stadium	Score	Win	Loss	Save	Attendance	Overall	NCAA Tourn.
June 3	2:00 pm	ESPN3	Fairfield*	#7	Dan Law Field at Rip Griffin Park • Lubbock, TX (NCAA Regional)	**W** 12–1	**Martin** (9–0)	Dube (6–4)	–	4,732	42–16	1–0
June 4	6:00 pm	ESPN3	New Mexico*	#7	Dan Law Field at Rip Griffin Park • Lubbock, TX (NCAA Regional)	**W** 4–3	**Shetter** (4–2)	Tripp (2–2)	**Howard** (8)	4,732	43–16	2–0
June 5	6:15 pm	ESPN3	#19 Dallas Baptist*	#7	Dan Law Field at Rip Griffin Park • Lubbock, TX (NCAA Regional)	**L** 6–10	Johnson (5–3)	**Damron** (4–2)	Fritz (1)	4,732	43–17	2–1
June 6	2:00 pm	ESPN3	#19 Dallas Baptist*	#7	Dan Law Field at Rip Griffin Park • Lubbock, TX (NCAA Regional)	**W** 5–3	**Howard** (9–3)	Wilson (0–1)	–	4,732	44–17	3–1
June 10	7:00 pm	ESPNU	#15 East Carolina*	#7	Dan Law Field at Rip Griffin Park • Lubbock, TX (NCAA Super Regional)	**L** 6–8	Kruczynski (8–1)	**Martin** (9–1)	Bridges (2)	4,817	44–18	3–2
June 11	2:00 pm	ESPNU	#15 East Carolina*	#7	Dan Law Field at Rip Griffin Park • Lubbock, TX (NCAA Super Regional)	**W** 3–1^{13}	**Dugger** (6–0)	Lanier (2–2)	–	4,817	45–18	4–2
June 12	2:00 pm	ESPNU	#15 East Carolina*	#7	Dan Law Field at Rip Griffin Park • Lubbock, TX (NCAA Super Regional)	**W** 11–0	**Lanning** (3–3)	Wolfe (6–4)	–	4,817	46–18	5–2
June 19	2:00 pm	ESPNU	vs. #3 TCU*	#4	TD Ameritrade Park • Omaha, NE (College World Series)	**L** 3–5	Burnett (3–1)	**Dugger** (6–1)	Feltman (9)	19,834	46–19	5–3
June 21	2:00 pm	ESPN2	vs. #1 Florida*	#4	TD Ameritrade Park • Omaha,NE (College World Series)	**W** 3–2	**Martin** (10–1)	Faedo (13–3)	**Howard** (9)	16,865	47–19	6–3
June 23	7:00 pm	ESPN2	vs. #5 Coastal Carolina*	#4	TD Ameritrade Park • Omaha,NE (College World Series)							

Legend: = Win = Loss Bold = Texas Tech team member
All rankings from Collegiate Baseball.

== Rankings ==
Ranking movements Legend: ██ Increase in ranking ██ Decrease in ranking — = Not ranked RV = Received votes
	Week																		
Poll	Pre	1	2	3	4	5	6	7	8	9	10	11	12	13	14	15	16	17	Final
Coaches'	RV	RV*	RV*	RV	RV	RV	RV	RV	21	13	14	10	9	7	8	11	11*	11*	6
Baseball America	—	—	—	—	—	—	—	23	15	10	13	8	5	5	5	8	8*	8*	7
Collegiate Baseball^	39	—	—	—	—	—	29	19	10	7	10	10	9	7	7	7	7	4	5
NCBWA†	RV	—	RV	—	—	RV	RV	RV	23	16	17	14	5	8	9	11	8	8*	5

^ Collegiate Baseball ranked 40 teams in their preseason poll, but only ranked 30 teams weekly during the season.
† NCBWA ranks 30 teams in their preseason poll, but only ranks 25 teams weekly during the season.
* A new poll was not released for this week, so for comparison purposes, the previous week's ranking is inserted in this week's slot.
