= 2016 Virginia Cavaliers baseball team =

American college baseball season

2016 Virginia Cavaliers baseball
- Conference: Atlantic Coast Conference
- Record: 38–22 (19–11 ACC)
- Head coach: Brian O'Connor (13th season)
- Assistant coaches: Kevin McMullan (13th season); Karl Kuhn (13th season); Matt Kirby (5th season)
- Home stadium: Davenport Field

2016 Atlantic Coast Conference baseball standings
	Conf.				Overall
Team	W		L	PCT	W		L	PCT
Atlantic
No. 11 Louisville ^{x}‍‍‍^{y}	22	–	8	.733	48	–	12	.800
No. 14 Florida State ‍‍‍^{y}	16	–	10	.615	38	–	20	.655
No. 20 NC State ‍‍‍^{y}	15	–	13	.536	36	–	20	.643
No. 18 Clemson ‍‍‡‍^{y}	16	–	14	.533	43	–	18	.705
No. 16 Boston College ‍‍‍^{y}	13	–	15	.464	35	–	22	.614
Wake Forest ‍‍‍^{y}	13	–	17	.433	35	–	25	.583
Notre Dame ‍‍‍	11	–	17	.393	27	–	27	.500
Coastal
No. 8 Miami (FL) ^{x}‍‍‍^{y}	21	–	7	.750	46	–	11	.807
No. 17 Virginia ‍‍‍^{y}	19	–	11	.633	38	–	20	.655
Duke ‍‍‍^{y}	14	–	15	.483	33	–	23	.589
Georgia Tech ‍‍‍^{y}	13	–	16	.448	36	–	24	.600
North Carolina ‍‍‍	13	–	17	.433	34	–	21	.618
Pittsburgh ‍‍‍	10	–	18	.357	25	–	26	.490
Virginia Tech ‍‍‍	6	–	24	.200	19	–	36	.345
x – Division champion ‡ – Tournament champion y – Invited to the NCAA tournament As of June 4, 2016; Rankings from Collegiate Baseball

The 2016 Virginia Cavaliers baseball team represented the University of Virginia during the 2016 NCAA Division I baseball season. The Cavaliers played their home games at Davenport Field as a member of the Atlantic Coast Conference. They were led by head coach Brian O'Connor, in his 13th season at Virginia. The defending NCAA champions made it to the NCAA Tournament and hosted their own regional. They were eliminated by William & Mary.

== Previous season ==
In 2015, the Cavaliers finished the season 2nd in the ACC's Coastal Division with a record of 33–19, 15–15 in conference play. They qualified for the 2015 Atlantic Coast Conference baseball tournament by winning a play in game against Georgia Tech, and were eliminated in pool play, losing all three. They qualified for the 2015 NCAA Division I baseball tournament unseeded and were placed in the Lake Elsinore Regional, hosted by UC Santa Barbara. Also in the regional were UC Santa Barbara, San Diego State, and USC. The Cavaliers defeated USC, 6–1, in the opening game, and USC, 3–1, to advance to the regional final. There, they again defeated USC, this time by a score of 14–10 in 11 innings. the Super Regional was hosted by the Cavaliers in Charlottesville. There Cavaliers defeated Maryland, 5–3 and 5–4, defeating Maryland in a super regional for the second year in a row, to advance to the College World Series.

In the College World Series, Virginia's first game was against Arkansas, whom the Cavaliers defeated, 5–3. In the second round, Virginia defeated #4 national seed Florida, 1–0. In the semifinals, the Cavaliers lost to Florida, 10–5, but bounced back in the second game, winning 5–4. The Cavaliers advanced to the College World Series finals to play Vanderbilt, a rematch of the 2014 world series. In the first game of the finals, the Commodores won by a score of 5–1. Virginia then rebounded to defeat Vanderbilt, 3–0, in game two. In a winner-take-all game three, Virginia prevailed, 4–2, to be crowned national champions. Josh Sborz was named the College World Series Most Outstanding Player recording three wins and a save in four games; pitching 13 scoreless innings with 10 strikeouts, four walks and seven hits allowed.

== Personnel ==
=== Roster ===
2016 Virginia Cavaliers roster
Pitchers: 7 – Adam Haseley – Sophomore; 9 – Daniel Lynch – Freshman; 11 – Bennett Sousa – Sophomore; 13 – Alec Bettinger – Junior; 14 – Derek Casey – Sophomore; 15 – Riley Wilson – (redshirt) Freshman; 16 – Tommy Doyle – Sophomore; 17 – Jack Roberts – (redshirt) Sophomore; 23 – Grant Donahue – Freshman; 27 – Chesdin Harrington – Freshman; 28 – Kevin Doherty – Senior; 29 – Connor Eason – Freshman; 30 – Holden Grounds – Junior; 33 – Connor Jones – Junior; 34 – Evan Sperling – Freshman; 35 – David Rosenberger – Senior; 45 – Grant Sloan – Freshman; 53 – Tyler Shambora – Junior	Catchers: 8 – Robbie Coman – Senior; 21 – Matt Thaiss – Junior; 55 – Cameron Comer – Freshman; Infielders: 2 – Jon Meola – Freshman; 3 – Jack Weiller – Freshman; 4 – Ernie Clement – Sophomore; 5 – Ryan Karstetter – Freshman; 10 – Pavin Smith – Sophomore; 12 – Charlie Cody – Sophomore; 18 – Justin Novak – Sophomore; 19 – Andy Weber – Freshman; 22 – Daniel Pinero – Junior; 25 – Jack Gerstenmaier – Sophomore; 32 – Nate Eikhoff – Freshman	Outfielders: 20 – Cameron Simmons – Freshman; 31 – Jake McCarthy – Freshman; 37 – Doak Dozier – Freshman

=== Coaching staff ===
Name	Position	Seasons at Virginia	Alma mater
Brian O'Connor	Head coach	13	Creighton University (1993)
Kevin McMullan	Associate head coach	13	Indiana University of Pennsylvania (1990)
Karl Kuhn	Assistant coach	13	University of Florida (1992)
Matt Kirby	Assistant coach	5	College of William & Mary (2003)

== Schedule ==
Legend
	Virginia win
	Virginia loss
	Postponement
**Bold**	Virginia team member

2016 Virginia Cavaliers baseball game log
Regular season
February

Date	Opponent	Rank	Site/stadium	Score	Win	Loss	Save	Attendance	Overall record	ACC Record
February 19	vs Kent State	#9	Pelicans Ballpark • Myrtle Beach, SC	8–6	**Jones** (1–0)	Lauer (0–1)	**Bettinger** (1)		1–0	
February 20	vs Appalachian State	#9	Pelicans Ballpark • Myrtle Beach, SC	8–0	**Lynch** (1–0)	Seth (0–1)		850	2–0	
February 21	at Coastal Carolina	#9	Pelicans Ballpark • Myrtle Beach, SC	5–4	Beckwith (1–0)	**Bettinger** (0–1)		3136	2–1	
February 23	VMI	#9	Davenport Field • Charlottesville, VA	18–1	**Haseley** (1–0)	Gorman (0–1)		3105	3–1	
February 26	East Carolina	#9	Davenport Field • Charlottesville, VA	8–5	Ingle (1–0)	**Bettinger** (0–2)		3351	3–2	
February 27	East Carolina	#9	Davenport Field • Charlottesville, VA	6–1	Jacob (2–0)	**Lynch** (1–1)	Durazo (1)	3669	3–3	
February 28	East Carolina	#9	Davenport Field • Charlottesville, VA	4–2	**Doyle** (1–0)	Boyd (1–1)	**Bettinger** (2)	3993	4–3	

March

Date	Opponent	Rank	Site/stadium	Score	Win	Loss	Save	Attendance	Overall record	ACC Record
March 1	William & Mary	#15	Davenport Field • Charlottesville, VA	6–2	**Haseley** (2–0)	Sheehan (0–2)		3105	5–3	
March 4	Monmouth	#15	Davenport Field • Charlottesville, VA	4–2	**Jones** (2–0)	Trimarco (1–1)	**Bettinger**(3)	3092	6–3	
March 5	Monmouth	#15	Davenport Field • Charlottesville, VA	11–10^{11}	**Sousa** (1–0)	Brambilla (0–1)		3399	7–3	
March 6	Monmouth	#15	Davenport Field • Charlottesville, VA	4–6	Dennis (1–1)	**Doyle** (1–1)	Andrews (1)	3321	7–4	
March 8	Wagner	#15	Davenport Field • Charlottesville, VA	6–2	**Haseley** (3–0)	Adams (0–2)		3071	8–4	
March 9	Wagner	#15	Davenport Field • Charlottesville, VA	20–7	**Rosenberger** (1–0)	Abbatiello (0–1)		3149	9–4	
March 11	at Duke	#15	Durham Bulls Athletic Park • Durham, NC	6–0	**Jones** (3–0)	Clark (2–1)		632	10–4	1–0
March 12	at Duke	#15	Durham Bulls Athletic Park • Durham, NC	7–6	**Shambora** (1–0)	Stallings (0–1)	**Bettinger** (4)	906	11–4	2–0
March 13	at Duke	#15	Durham Bulls Athletic Park • Durham, NC	0–3	McAfee (2–1)	**Doyle** (1–2)		533	11–5	2–1
March 15	Towson	#14	Davenport Field • Charlottesville, VA	2–1	**Haseley** (4–0)	Morris (0–1)	**Bettinger** (5)	2949	12–5	
March 16	Towson	#14	Davenport Field • Charlottesville, VA	10–8	**Sousa** (2–0)	Stricker (2–1)	**Bettinger** (6)	3072	13–5	
March 18	Wake Forest	#14	Davenport Field • Charlottesville, VA	4–0	**Jones** (4–0)	Dunshee (3–2)		3488	14–5	3–1
March 18	Wake Forest	#14	Davenport Field • Charlottesville, VA	6–4	**Shambora** (2–0)	McCarren (2–1)		3453	15–5	4–1
March 19	Wake Forest	#14	Davenport Field • Charlottesville, VA	8–9	Sellers (2–1)	**Bettinger** (0–3)		3686	15–6	4–2
March 22	James Madison	#16	Davenport Field • Charlottesville, VA	15–6	**Haseley** (5–0)	Taylor		3384	16–6	
March 25	at #7 Louisville	#16	Jim Patterson Stadium • Louisville, KY	6–3	**Jones** (5–0)	Funkhouser (2–2)	**Bettinger** (7)	2667	17–6	5–2
March 26	at #7 Louisville	#16	Jim Patterson Stadium • Louisville, KY	4–11	McKay (5–1)	**Lynch** (1–2)		3334	17–7	5–3
March 27	at #7 Louisville	#16	Jim Patterson Stadium • Louisville, KY	0–15	Harrington (5–1)	**Doyle** (1–3)		2024	17–8	5–4
March 29	Old Dominion	#21	Davenport Field • Charlottesville, VA	4–5	Bailey (2–0)	**Bettinger** (0–4)	Smith (1)	3383	17–9	

April

Date	Opponent	Rank	Site/stadium	Score	Win	Loss	Save	Attendance	Overall record	ACC Record
April 1	#22 NC State	#21	Davenport Field • Charlottesville, VA	7–8	Staley (1–1)	**Jones** (5–1)	DeJuneas (5)	3927	17–10	5–5
April 2	#22 NC State	#21	Davenport Field • Charlottesville, VA	5–3	**Haseley** (6–0)	Brown (3–1)		4300	18–10	6–5
April 3	#22 NC State	#21	Davenport Field • Charlottesville, VA	2–5	Williamson (5–0)	**Doyle** (1–4)	Gilbert (3)	3874	18–11	6–6
April 5	at VCU	#26	The Diamond • Richmond, VA	5–7	Ebersole (3–2)	**Lynch** (1–3)		3028	18–12	
April 6	George Washington	#26	Davenport Field • Charlottesville, VA	15–3	**Rosenberger** (2–0)	Sheinkop (1–3)		3097	19–12	
April 8	at Boston College	#26	Eddie Pellagrini Diamond at John Shea Field • Chestnut Hill, MA	3–0	**Jones** (6–1)	Stevens (2–1)		230	20–12	7–6
April 9	at Boston College	#26	Eddie Pellagrini Diamond at John Shea Field • Chestnut Hill, MA	1–2	Adams (3–3)	**Doyle** (1–5)		519	20–13	7–7
April 10	at Boston College	#26	Eddie Pellagrini Diamond at John Shea Field • Chestnut Hill, MA	4–5^{13}	Adams (4–3)	**Harrington** (0–1)		412	20–14	7–8
April 13	Longwood		Davenport Field • Charlottesville, VA	9–4	**Shambora** (3–0)	Gould (1–1)		3055	21–14	
April 15	#21 North Carolina		Davenport Field • Charlottesville, VA	7–4	**Jones** (7–1)	Gallen (4–3)	**Doyle** (1)	3933	22–14	8–8
April 16	#21 North Carolina		Davenport Field • Charlottesville, VA	1–8	Bukauskas (6–1)	**Haseley** (6–1)		4975	22–15	8–9
April 17	#21 North Carolina		Davenport Field • Charlottesville, VA	15–9	**Doherty** (1–0)	Bogucki (2–2)		4950	23–15	9–9
April 19	Radford	#20	Davenport Field • Charlottesville, VA	11–3	**Sousa** (3–0)	Swarmer (2–3)	**Shambora** (1)	3264	24–15	
April 20	VCU	#20	Davenport Field • Charlottesville, VA	5–11	Crabb (2–0)	**Doherty** (1–1)		3345	24–16	
April 22	at #1 Miami (FL)	#20	Alex Rodriguez Park at Mark Light Field • Coral Gables, FL	6–5	**Jones** (8–1)	Woodrey (4–3)	**Doyle** (1)	3015	25–16	10–9
April 23	at #1 Miami (FL)	#20	Mark Light Field at Alex Rodriguez Park • Coral Gables, FL	2–9	Mediavilla (7–1)	**Haseley** (6–2)		4099	25–17	10–10
April 24	at #1 Miami (FL)	#20	Mark Light Field at Alex Rodriguez Park • Coral Gables, FL	7–3	**Bettinger** (1–4)	Garcia (6–3)	**Doyle** (2)	2837	26–17	11–10
April 26	at Old Dominion	#16	Harbor Park • Norfolk, VA	8–4	**Shambora** (4–0)	Hartman (4–4)	**Doherty** (1)	4826	27–17	
April 30	at Pittsburgh	#16	Petersen Sports Complex • Pittsburgh, PA	5–1	**Jones** (9–1)	Zeuch (5–1)		718	28–17	12–10
April 30	at Pittsburgh	#16	Petersen Sports Complex • Pittsburgh, PA	7–6	**Harrington** (1–1)	Chentouf (0–1)	**Doyle** (3)	718	29–17	13–10

May

Date	Opponent	Rank	Site/stadium	Score	Win	Loss	Save	Attendance	Overall record	ACC Record
May 1	at Pittsburgh	#16	Petersen Sports Complex • Pittsburgh, PA	9–1	**Haseley** (7–2)	Garbee (1–3)		318	30–17	14–10
May 3	at Liberty	#11	Liberty Baseball Stadium • Lynchburg, VA	7–3	**Shambora** (5–0)	Clouse (3–2)		4024	31–17	
May 13	#22 Georgia Tech	#11	Davenport Field • Charlottesville, VA	6–3	**Jones** (10–1)	Gold (6–3)		3703	32–17	15–10
May 14	#22 Georgia Tech	#11	Davenport Field • Charlottesville, VA	9–4	**Bettinger** (2–4)	Parr (7–1)		4500	33–17	16–10
May 15	#22 Georgia Tech	#11	Davenport Field • Charlottesville, VA	4–5	Gorst (1–1)	**Haseley** (7–3)		4531	33–18	16–11
May 17	Richmond	#9	Davenport Field • Charlottesville, VA	Canceled						
May 19	Virginia Tech	#9	Davenport Field • Charlottesville, VA	8–3	**Jones** (11–1)	Scheetz (5–6)	Doherty (2)	3832	34–18	17–11
May 20	Virginia Tech	#9	Davenport Field • Charlottesville, VA	7–6	**Doyle** (2–5)	Kragel (2–4)		3759	35–18	18–11
May 21	Virginia Tech	#9	Davenport Field • Charlottesville, VA	4–1	**Haseley** (8–3)	Woodcock (1–8)		4367	36–18	19–11

Post-season
ACC Tournament

Date	Opponent	Rank	Site/stadium	Score	Win	Loss	Save	Attendance	Overall record	ACCT Record
May 26	#28 Clemson	#8	Durham Bulls Athletic Park • Durham, NC	5–4	Krall (9–1)	**Shambora** (5–1)		3259	36–19	0–1
May 27	Wake Forest	#8	Durham Bulls Athletic Park • Durham, NC	10–9	Kelly (1–2)	**Bettinger** (2–5)	Craig (8)	3027	36–20	0–2
May 28	#3 Louisville	#8	Durham Bulls Athletic Park • Durham, NC	7–2	**Haseley** (9–3)	Harrington (11–2)		5188	37–20	1–2

NCAA tournament – Charlottesville Regional

Date	Opponent	Rank	Site/stadium	Score	Win	Loss	Save	Attendance	Overall record	NCAAT Record
June 3	William & Mary	#8	Davenport Field • Charlottesville, VA	17–4	**Bettinger** (3–5)	Powers (8–6)		3949	38–20	1–0
June 4	East Carolina	#8	Davenport Field • Charlottesville, VA	6–8	Ingle (6–3)	**Doyle** (2–6)		4628	38–21	1–1
June 5	William & Mary	#8	Davenport Field • Charlottesville, VA	4–5	White (2–3)	**Doyle** (2–7)	Gaouette (11)	3649	38–22	1–2

All rankings from Collegiate Baseball.

== Rankings ==
Ranking movements Legend: ██ Increase in ranking ██ Decrease in ranking — = Not ranked
	Week																		
Poll	Pre	1	2	3	4	5	6	7	8	9	10	11	12	13	14	15	16	17	Final
Coaches'	7	7*	7*	18	17	12	16	22	25	22	18	16	14	13	12				
Baseball America	4	4	8	10	10	9	14	—	—	—	22	16	15	9	8				
Collegiate Baseball^	9	9	14	15	14	16	21	26	—	20	16	11	11	9	8	8			
NCBWA†	8	8	14	14	12	11	14	20	25	22	20	16	14	12	11				

^ Collegiate Baseball ranked 40 teams in their preseason poll, but only ranked 30 teams weekly during the season.
† NCBWA ranks 30 teams in their preseason poll, but only ranks 25 teams weekly during the season.
* A new poll was not released for this week, so for comparison purposes, the previous week's ranking is inserted in this week's slot.

== Awards and honors ==
Connor Jones

- Baseball America Pre-season Third team All-American
- All-ACC first team

Pavin Smith

- Baseball America Pre-season Third team All-American
- All-ACC second team

Matt Thaiss

- All-ACC second team
- ACC Baseball Championship All-Tournament Team

Ernie Clement

- All-ACC third team

Daniel Pinero

- ACC Baseball Championship All-Tournament Team
