= 2016 Oklahoma State Cowboys baseball team =

American college baseball season

2016 Oklahoma State Cowboys baseball

NCAA Clemson Regional champions NCAA Columbia Super Regional champions

College World Series, 2–2
- Conference: Big 12 Conference

Ranking
- Coaches: No. 4
- CB: No. 4
- Record: 43–22 (16–8 Big 12)
- Head coach: Josh Holliday (4th season)
- Assistant coaches: Rob Walton (4th season); James Vilade (1st season); Mark Ginther (2nd season)
- Home stadium: Allie P. Reynolds Stadium

2016 Big 12 Conference baseball standings
	Conf.						Overall
Team	W		L		T	PCT	W		L		T	PCT
No. 5 Texas Tech ‍†‍‍^{y}	19	–	5	–	0	.792	47	–	20	–	0	.701
No. 4 Oklahoma State ‍‍‍^{y}	16	–	8	–	0	.667	43	–	22	–	0	.662
No. 3 TCU ‍‍‡‍^{y}	15	–	9	–	0	.625	49	–	18	–	0	.731
West Virginia ‍‍‍	12	–	11	–	0	.522	36	–	22	–	0	.621
Oklahoma ‍‍‍	11	–	13	–	0	.458	30	–	27	–	1	.526
Baylor ‍‍‍	10	–	14	–	0	.417	24	–	29	–	0	.453
Texas ‍‍‍	10	–	14	–	0	.417	25	–	32	–	0	.439
Kansas State ‍‍‍	8	–	16	–	0	.333	26	–	31	–	0	.456
Kansas ‍‍‍	6	–	17	–	0	.261	20	–	35	–	1	.366
† – Conference champion ‡ – Tournament champion y – Invited to the NCAA tournament Rankings from Collegiate Baseball

The 2016 Oklahoma State Cowboys baseball team represented Oklahoma State University during the 2016 NCAA Division I baseball season. The Cowboys played their home games at Allie P. Reynolds Stadium as a member of the Big 12 Conference. They were led by head coach Josh Holliday, in his fourth season at Oklahoma State.

== Previous season ==
The 2015 Oklahoma State Cowboys baseball team notched a 38–20 (14–8) regular season record and finished second in the Big 12 Conference standings. The Cowboys reached the 2015 Big 12 Conference baseball tournament championship game, where they fell to Texas. Oklahoma State received an at-large bid to the 2015 NCAA Division I baseball tournament and was selected as one of the sixteen Regional hosts. The Cowboys were eliminated from the NCAA tournament with losses to Arkansas and St. John's (NY).

== Personnel ==
=== Roster ===
2016 Oklahoma State Cowboys roster
Pitchers: 14 - Ben Leeper (RHP) - Freshman; 15 - Garrett Williams (LHP) - Junior; 19 - Carson Teel (LHP) - (redshirt) Freshman; 23 - Bryce Verplank (RHP) - Freshman; 24 - Conor Costello (RHP) - Senior; 25 - Trey Cobb (RHP) - Junior; 26 - Luke Matheny (RHP) - Freshman; 27 - Michael Mertz (RHP) - Junior; 28 - Corey Hassel (RHP) - Senior; 30 - Remey Reed (RHP) - Junior; 31 - Matt Wilson (LHP) - Sophomore; 34 - Jensen Elliott (RHP) - Freshman; 36 - Max Simpson (RHP) - Sophomore; 37 - Tyler Buffett (RHP) - Junior; 39 - Alex Hackerott (LHP) - Senior; 42 - Jake Cowan (RHP) - Sophomore; 43 - Blake Battenfield (RHP) - Sophomore; 45 - Thomas Hatch (RHP) - Sophomore; 46 - Joe Lienhard (RHP) - Freshman	Catchers: 16 - Collin Theroux - Junior; 17 - Baylor Rowlett - Freshman; 18 - Colin Simpson - Freshman; Infielders: 2 - J.R. Davis - Sophomore; 4 - Jacob Chappell - Sophomore; 5 - Donnie Walton - Senior; 6 - David Petrino - Senior; 7 - Garrett Benge - Sophomore; 22 - Dustin Williams - Junior; 33 - Mason O'Brien - Sophomore; 38 - Nick Gallo - Junior; 44 - Andrew Rosa - Sophomore	Outfielders: 1 - Alex Shaver - Freshman; 3 - Garrett McCain - Sophomore; 8 - Ryan Sluder - Junior; 13 - Jon Littell - Sophomore; 23 - Bryce Verplank - Freshman; 24 - Conor Costello - Senior; 28 - Corey Hassel - Senior

=== Coaching staff ===
Name	Position	Seasons at Oklahoma State	Alma mater
Josh Holliday	Head coach	4	Oklahoma State University (2004)
Rob Walton	Assistant coach–Pitching	4	Oklahoma State University (1986)
James Vilade	Assistant coach–Recruiting Coordinator	1	Baylor University (1995)
Mark Ginther	Volunteer Assistant Coach	2	Oklahoma State University (2012)

== Schedule and results ==
2016 Oklahoma State Cowboys baseball game log
Regular season (35–18)
February (2–5)

Date	Time (CT)	TV	Opponent	Rank	Site/stadium	Score	Win	Loss	Save	Attendance	Overall	Big 12
February 19	11:00 am		at Texas–Arlington*	#25	Clay Gould Ballpark • Arlington, TX	**L** 2–3	Kuhnel (1–0)	**Cobb** (0–1)	James (1)	647	0–1	–
February 20	11:00 am		Stephen F. Austin*	#25	Clay Gould Ballpark • Arlington, TX	**W** 8–2	**Reed** (1–0)	Starks (0–1)	–	664	1–1	–
February 20	2:30 pm		at Texas–Arlington*	#25	Clay Gould Ballpark • Arlington, TX	**W** 5–3	**Elliott** (1–0)	Wilcox (0–1)	Mertz (1)	1,063	2–1	–
February 21	11:00 am		Stephen F. Austin*	#25	Clay Gould Ballpark • Arlington, TX	**L** 4–5^{10}	Adams (1–0)	**Reed** (1–1)	–	683	2–2	–
February 26	2:00 pm		at #13 North Carolina*		Boshamer Stadium • Chapel Hill, NC	**L** 1–2	Williams (1–0)	**Buffett** (0–1)	–	1,286	2–3	–
February 27	1:00 pm		at #13 North Carolina*		Boshamer Stadium • Chapel Hill, NC	**L** 6–7^{10}	Aker (2–1)	**Cobb** (0–2)	–	1,793	2–4	–
February 28	11:00 am		at #13 North Carolina*		Boshamer Stadium • Chapel Hill, NC	**L** 3–4	Butler (1–0)	**Cobb** (0–3)	–	1,828	2–5	–

March (16–2)

Date	Time (CT)	TV	Opponent	Rank	Site/stadium	Score	Win	Loss	Save	Attendance	Overall	Big 12
March 1	4:00 pm	COX	Incarnate Word*		Allie P. Reynolds Stadium • Stillwater, OK	**W** 7–1	**Teel** (1–0)	Preiss (0–1)	–	734	3–5	–
March 2	4:00 pm	COX	Incarnate Word*		Allie P. Reynolds Stadium • Stillwater, OK	**W** 3–2	**Buffett** (1–1)	Moszkowicz (0–1)	**Cobb** (1)	508	4–5	–
March 4	4:00 pm	COX	Indiana State*		Allie P. Reynolds Stadium • Stillwater, OK	**W** 1–0	**Buffett** (2–1)	McKinney (1–1)	**Cobb** (2)	745	5–5	–
March 5	2:00 pm	COX	Indiana State*		Allie P. Reynolds Stadium • Stillwater, OK	**W** 9–2	**Battenfield** (1–0)	Peterson (2–1)	**Reed** (1)	702	6–5	–
March 6	1:00 pm	COX	Indiana State*		Allie P. Reynolds Stadium • Stillwater, OK	**L** 0–2	Hill (2–0)	**Mertz** (0–1)	McKinney (1)	588	6–6	–
March 8	3:00 pm		at #12 Missouri State*		Hammons Field • Springfield, MO	**W** 6–5^{10}	**Cobb** (1–3)	Young (0–1)	–	505	7–6	–
March 11	4:00 pm	COX	Abilene Christian*		Allie P. Reynolds Stadium • Stillwater, OK	**W** 8–2	**Hatch** (1–0)	Carroll; 2–2	–	411	8–6	–
March 12	2:00 pm	COX	Abilene Christian*		Allie P. Reynolds Stadium • Stillwater, OK	**W** 16–0	**Elliott** (2–0)	deMeyere (2–1)	–	555	9–6	–
March 14	2:00 pm	COX	Abilene Christian*		Allie P. Reynolds Stadium • Stillwater, OK	**W** 8–4	**Cobb** (2–3)	Mason (3–1)	–	385	10–6	–
March 15	6:30 pm		at #26 Dallas Baptist*		Horner Ballpark • Dallas, TX	**W** 7–6	**Buffett** (3–1)	Johnson (2–1)	**Battenfield** (1)	1,321	11–6	–
March 18	4:00 pm	COX	#24 Michigan*		Allie P. Reynolds Stadium • Stillwater, OK	**W** 6–3	**Reed** (2–1)	Jaskie (3–1)	**Battenfield** (2)	377	12–6	–
March 19	2:00 pm	COX	#24 Michigan*		Allie P. Reynolds Stadium • Stillwater, OK	**W** 5–4	**Cobb** (3–3)	Adcock (1–2)	**Buffett** (1)	919	13–6	–
March 20	1:00 pm	COX	#24 Michigan*		Allie P. Reynolds Stadium • Stillwater, OK	**L** 2–4	Hill (3–1)	**Elliott** (2–1)	Pall (3)	551	13–7	–
March 22	6:30 pm		at Wichita State*		Eck Stadium • Wichita, KS	**W** 17–0	**Mertz** (1–1)	Williams (0–2)	–	2,548	14–7	–
March 24	6:05 pm	FS1	at Kansas State		Tointon Family Stadium • Manhattan, KS	**W** 2–1	**Hatch** (2–0)	MaVorhis (3–1)	**Buffett** (2)	1,884	15–7	1–0
March 25	6:35 pm	FCS	at Kansas State		Tointon Family Stadium • Manhattan, KS	**W** 5–4	**Williams** (1–0)	Rigler (2–4)	**Buffett** (3)	2,337	16–7	2–0
March 26	1:05 pm	ESPN3	at Kansas State		Tointon Family Stadium • Manhattan, KS	**W** 5-4^{10}	**Buffett** (4–1)	Benenati (0–1)	–	2,006	17–7	3–0
March 29	6:30 pm	FSSW+	Arkansas*		Allie P. Reynolds Stadium • Stillwater, OK	**W** 5–4	**Reed** (3–1)	Willey (0–1)	**Buffett** (4)	2,418	18–7	–

April (9–8)

Date	Time (CT)	TV	Opponent	Rank	Site/stadium	Score	Win	Loss	Save	Attendance	Overall	Big 12
April 1	5:30 pm		at West Virginia		Monongalia County Ballpark • Granville, WV	**L** 4–5^{10}	Smith (1–0)	**Battenfield** (1–1)	–	1,818	18–8	3–1
April 2	3:00 pm		at West Virginia		Monongalia County Ballpark • Granville, WV	**L** 3–4	Vance (4–1)	**Cobb** (3–4)	Dotson (1)	1,467	18–9	3–2
April 3	12:00 pm		at West Virginia		Monongalia County Ballpark • Granville, WV	**W** 8–1	**Elliott** (3–1)	Myers (2–3)	–	951	19–9	4–2
April 8	6:00 pm	FSSW+	#19 Texas Tech		Allie P. Reynolds Stadium • Stillwater, OK	**L** 1–5	Moseley (3–2)	**Hatch** (2–1)	–	1,977	19–10	4–3
April 9	3:00 pm	COX	#19 Texas Tech		Allie P. Reynolds Stadium • Stillwater, OK	**L** 2–8	Dugger (3–0)	**Cobb** (3–5)	–	2,855	19–11	4–4
April 10	1:00 pm	FCS	#19 Texas Tech		Allie P. Reynolds Stadium • Stillwater, OK	**L** 5–15^{7}	Harpenau (1–0)	**Elliott** (3–2)	–	1,258	19–12	4–5
April 12	6:00 pm	FSSW+	Oral Roberts*		Allie P. Reynolds Stadium • Stillwater, OK	**L** 0–4	McMinn (3–2)	**Mertz** (1–2)	–	1,157	19–13	4–5
April 15	6:30 pm	FSSW+	at Baylor		Baylor Ballpark • Waco, TX	**W** 6–2^{12}	**Buffett** (5–1)	Heineman (2–3)	–	2,963	20–13	5–5
April 16	1:00 pm	FSSW	at Baylor		Baylor Ballpark • Waco, TX	**W** 10–7	**Cobb** (4–5)	Tolson (4–2)	–	2,546	21–13	6–5
April 16	5:00 pm		at Baylor		Baylor Ballpark • Waco, TX	**W** 3–1	**Elliott** (4–2)	Hill (1–2)	**Buffett** (5)	2,776	22–13	7–5
April 19	6:00 pm	FCS Atlantic	at Oklahoma*		L. Dale Mitchell Baseball Park • Norman, OK	**W** (4–3)	**Lienhard** (1–0)	Irvin (2–1)	**Buffett** (6)	1,792	23–13	7–5
April 22	6:00 pm	FCS	#8 TCU		Allie P. Reynolds Stadium • Stillwater, OK	**W** (9–0)	**Hatch** (3–1)	Janczak (4–3)	–	1,758	24–13	8–5
April 23	4:00 pm	FSSW+	#8 TCU		Allie P. Reynolds Stadium • Stillwater, OK	**L** 6–11	Horton (7–0)	**Cobb** (4–6)	Guillory (1)	1,988	24–14	8–6
April 24	1:00 pm	FCS	#8 TCU		Allie P. Reynolds Stadium • Stillwater, OK	**W** 11–7	**Elliott** (5–2)	Howard (5–2)	**Buffett** (7)	1,296	25–14	9–6
April 26	5:00 pm	SECN+	at Arkansas*	#25	Baum Stadium • Fayetteville, AR	**L** 6–7	Teague (3–3)	**Cowan** (0–1)	Knight (1)	7,164	25–15	9–6
April 30	2:30 pm	LHN	at Texas	#25	UFCU Disch–Falk Field • Austin, TX	**W** 3–0	**Hatch** (4–1)	Cooper (2–3)	–		26–15	10–6
April 30	3:30 pm	LHN	at Texas	#25	UFCU Disch–Falk Field • Austin, TX	**W** 6–2	**Elliott** (6–2)	Culbreth (8–3)	**Buffett** (8)	6,312	27–15	11–6

May (8–3)

Date	Time (CT)	TV	Opponent	Rank	Site/stadium	Score	Win	Loss	Save	Attendance	Overall	Big 12
May 1	1:30 pm	LHN	at Texas	#25	UFCU Disch–Falk Field • Austin, TX	**W** 8–4	**Hackerott** (1–0)	Shugart (1–2)	–	5,484	28–15	12–6
May 6	6:00 pm	COX	Prairie View A&M*	#16	Allie P. Reynolds Stadium • Stillwater, OK	**W** 9–0	**Hatch** (5–1)	Williams (2–8)	–	677	29–15	12–6
May 7	3:00 pm	COX	Prairie View A&M*	#16	Allie P. Reynolds Stadium • Stillwater, OK	**W** 12–0	**Elliott** (7–2)	Philpott (1–8)	–	632	30–15	12–6
May 10	6:00 pm	FSSW+	Dallas Baptist*	#12	Allie P. Reynolds Stadium • Stillwater, OK	**W** 8–7	**Buffett** (6–1)	Fouse (0–1)	–	627	31–15	12–6
May 13	6:30 pm	ESPNU	Oklahoma	#12	Bricktown Ballpark • Oklahoma City, OK	**L** 1–9	Irvin (5–1)	**Hatch** (5–2)	–	7,302	31–16	12–7
May 14	7:30 pm	FSSW+	Oklahoma	#12	ONEOK Field • Tulsa, OK	**W** 10–9	**Costello** (1–0)	Hansen (1–5)	**Mertz** (2)	8,007	32–16	13–7
May 15	2:00 pm	FSSW+	Oklahoma	#12	ONEOK Field • Tulsa, OK	**L** 1–3	Grove (2–0)	**Cobb** (4–7)	Neuse (5)	6,084	32–17	13–8
May 17	6:30 pm		at Oral Roberts*	#14	J. L. Johnson Stadium • Tulsa, OK	**L** 1–3	McCutchin (3–2)	**Buffett** (6–2)	Womacks (13)	1,839	32–18	13–8
May 20	2:00 pm	COX	Kansas	#14	Allie P. Reynolds Stadium • Stillwater, OK	**W** 4–3	**Hatch** (6–2)	Davis (1–1)	**Buffett** (9)		33–18	14–8
May 20	6:00 pm	FSSW+	Kansas	#14	Allie P. Reynolds Stadium • Stillwater, OK	**W** 9–2	**Elliott** (8–2)	Krauth (5–6)	–	918	34–18	15–8
May 21	3:00 pm	FSO	Kansas	#14	Allie P. Reynolds Stadium • Stillwater, OK	**W** 8–1	**Williams** (2–0)	Weiman (2–7)	–	1,033	35–18	16–8

Postseason
Big 12 Tournament (1–2)

Date	Time (CT)	TV	Opponent	Rank	Site/stadium	Score	Win	Loss	Save	Attendance	Overall	Tourney
May 25	7:30 pm	FCS	(7) Texas	(2)	Bricktown Ballpark • Oklahoma City, OK	**W** 10–4	**Reed** (4–1)	Culbreth; 8–4	**Mertz** (3)	4,850	36–18	1–0
May 26	7:30 pm	FCS	(3) TCU	(2)	Bricktown Ballpark • Oklahoma City, OK	**L** 5–13	Guillory (4–2)	**Buffett** (6–3)	–	4,296	36–19	1–1
May 26	7:00 pm	FCS	(7) Texas	(2)	Bricktown Ballpark • Oklahoma City, OK	**L** 8–12	Ridgeway (0–3)	**Mertz** (1–3)	–	5,593	36–20	1–2

Clemson Regional (3–0)

Date	Time (CT)	TV	Opponent	Rank	Site/stadium	Score	Win	Loss	Save	Attendance	Overall	Regional
June 3	11:00 am	ESPNU	(3) Nebraska	(2)	Doug Kingsmore Stadium • Clemson, SC	**W** 6–0	**Hatch** (7–2)	Waldron (7–3)	–	4,013	37–20	1–0
June 4	6:00 pm	ESPNU	at (1) Clemson	(2)	Doug Kingsmore Stadium • Clemson, SC	**W** 12–2	**Buffett** (7–3)	Schmidt (8–5)	–	5,629	38–20	2–0
June 5	8:10 pm	ESPN3	at (1) Clemson	(2)	Doug Kingsmore Stadium • Clemson, SC	**W** 9–2	**Elliott** (9–2)	Krall (10–2)	**Cobb** (3)	4,407	39–20	3–0

Columbia Super Regional (2–0)

Date	Time (CT)	TV	Opponent	Rank	Site/stadium	Score	Win	Loss	Save	Attendance	Overall	Super Regional
June 11	2:00 pm	ESPN2	at #6 South Carolina	#12	Founders Park • Columbia, SC	**W** 5–1	**Hatch** (8–2)	Webb (10–6)	**Cobb** (4)	7,840	40–20	1–0
June 12	2:00 pm	ESPN2	at #6 South Carolina	#12	Founders Park • Columbia, SC	**W** 3–1	**Buffett** (8–3)	Schmidt (9–5)	**Cobb** (5)	7,677	41–20	2–0

College World Series (2–2)

Date	Time (CT)	TV	Opponent	Rank	Site/stadium	Score	Win	Loss	Save	Attendance	Overall	CWS
June 18	2:00 pm	ESPN2	#8 UCSB	#6	TD Ameritrade Park • Omaha, NE	**W** 1–0	**Hatch** (9–2)	Bieber (12–4)	–	20,956	42–20	1–0
June 20	6:00 pm	ESPN	#7 Arizona	#6	TD Ameritrade Park • Omaha, NE	**W** 1–0	**Buffett** (9–3)	Dalbec (10–5)	**Cobb** (6)	22,981	43–20	2–0
June 24	2:00 pm	ESPN2	#7 Arizona	#6	TD Ameritrade Park • Omaha, NE	**L** 3–9	Ginkel (5–1)	**Elliott** (9–3)	Ming (4)	16,549	43–21	2–1
June 25	2:00 pm	ESPN2	#7 Arizona	#6	TD Ameritrade Park • Omaha, NE	**L** 1–5	Dalbec (11–5)	**Hatch** (9–3)	Rivas (3)	9,326	43–22	2–2

Legend: = Win = Loss Bold = Oklahoma State team member
"#" represents ranking. All rankings from Collegiate Baseball on the date of the contest.
"()" represents postseason seeding in the Big 12 Tournament or NCAA Regional, respectively.

== Rankings ==
Ranking movements Legend: ██ Increase in ranking ██ Decrease in ranking — = Not ranked RV = Received votes
	Week																		
Poll	Pre	1	2	3	4	5	6	7	8	9	10	11	12	13	14	15	16	17	Final
Coaches'	10	10*	10*	RV	RV	25	20	25	RV	RV	22	19	15	15	16	20	20*	20*	4
Baseball America	9	13	22	22	22	19	16	16	—	—	25	18	16	20	17	24	24*	24*	4
Collegiate Baseball^	25	—	—	—	—	—	—	—	—	—	25	16	12	14	12	18	12	6	4
NCBWA†	11	16	27	26	24	22	18	19	27	25	21	18	14	14	15	18	12	12*	4

^ Collegiate Baseball ranked 40 teams in their preseason poll, but only ranked 30 teams weekly during the season.
† NCBWA ranks 30 teams in their preseason poll, but only ranks 25 teams weekly during the season.
* A new poll was not released for this week, so for comparison purposes, the previous week's ranking is inserted in this week's slot.
