= 2016 Miami Hurricanes baseball team =

American college baseball season

2016 Miami Hurricanes baseball

ACC Coastal Division Champion Coral Gables Regional Champion Coral Gables Super Regional Champion

College World Series
- Conference: Atlantic Coast Conference

Ranking
- Coaches: No. 8
- CB: No. 8
- Record: 50–14 (21–7 ACC)
- Head coach: Jim Morris (23rd season)
- Assistant coaches: Gino DiMare (17th season); J.D. Arteaga (14th season); Norberto Lopez (1st season)
- Home stadium: Alex Rodriguez Park at Mark Light Field

2016 Atlantic Coast Conference baseball standings
| | Conf. | | | | Overall |
| Team | W | | L | PCT | W | | L | PCT |
|---|---|---|---|---|---|---|---|---|
Atlantic
| No. 11 Louisville ^{x}‍‍‍^{y} | 22 | – | 8 | .733 | 48 | – | 12 | .800 |
| No. 14 Florida State ‍‍‍^{y} | 16 | – | 10 | .615 | 38 | – | 20 | .655 |
| No. 20 NC State ‍‍‍^{y} | 15 | – | 13 | .536 | 36 | – | 20 | .643 |
| No. 18 Clemson ‍‍‡‍^{y} | 16 | – | 14 | .533 | 43 | – | 18 | .705 |
| No. 16 Boston College ‍‍‍^{y} | 13 | – | 15 | .464 | 35 | – | 22 | .614 |
| Wake Forest ‍‍‍^{y} | 13 | – | 17 | .433 | 35 | – | 25 | .583 |
| Notre Dame ‍‍‍ | 11 | – | 17 | .393 | 27 | – | 27 | .500 |
Coastal
| No. 8 Miami (FL) ^{x}‍‍‍^{y} | 21 | – | 7 | .750 | 46 | – | 11 | .807 |
| No. 17 Virginia ‍‍‍^{y} | 19 | – | 11 | .633 | 38 | – | 20 | .655 |
| Duke ‍‍‍^{y} | 14 | – | 15 | .483 | 33 | – | 23 | .589 |
| Georgia Tech ‍‍‍^{y} | 13 | – | 16 | .448 | 36 | – | 24 | .600 |
| North Carolina ‍‍‍ | 13 | – | 17 | .433 | 34 | – | 21 | .618 |
| Pittsburgh ‍‍‍ | 10 | – | 18 | .357 | 25 | – | 26 | .490 |
| Virginia Tech ‍‍‍ | 6 | – | 24 | .200 | 19 | – | 36 | .345 |
x – Division champion ‡ – Tournament champion y – Invited to the NCAA tournament As of June 4, 2016; Rankings from Collegiate Baseball

The 2016 Miami Hurricanes baseball team represented the University of Miami during the 2015 NCAA Division I baseball season. The Hurricanes played their home games at Alex Rodriguez Park at Mark Light Field as a member of the Atlantic Coast Conference. They were led by head coach Jim Morris, in his 22nd season at Miami.

== Rankings ==
Ranking movements Legend: ██ Increase in ranking ██ Decrease in ranking
| | Week | | | | | | | | | | | | | | | | | | |
| Poll | Pre | 1 | 2 | 3 | 4 | 5 | 6 | 7 | 8 | 9 | 10 | 11 | 12 | 13 | 14 | 15 | 16 | 17 | Final |
|---|---|---|---|---|---|---|---|---|---|---|---|---|---|---|---|---|---|---|---|
| Coaches' | 6 | 6* | 6* | 6 | 6 | 5 | 2 | 2 | 1 | 1 | 3 | 3 | 3 | 3 | 4 | 3 | 3* | 3* | 8 |
| Baseball America | 6 | 6 | 6 | 6 | 6 | 4 | 3 | 2 | 1 | 1 | 4 | 4 | 4 | 4 | 3 | 3 | 3* | 3* | 6 |
| Collegiate Baseball^ | 4 | 4 | 5 | 5 | 5 | 5 | 4 | 2 | 1 | 1 | 4 | 3 | 2 | 2 | 2 | 3 | 3 | 2 | 8 |
| NCBWA† | 6 | 5 | 6 | 6 | 6 | 4 | 2 | 2 | 1 | 2 | 4 | 4 | 4 | 4 | 3 | 2 | 2 | 2* | 8 |

^ Collegiate Baseball ranked 40 teams in their preseason poll, but only ranked 30 teams weekly during the season.
† NCBWA ranks 30 teams in their preseason poll, but only ranks 25 teams weekly during the season.
* A new poll was not released for this week, so for comparison purposes, the previous week's ranking is inserted in this week's slot.
