= 2016 West Virginia Mountaineers baseball team =

American college baseball season

2016 West Virginia Mountaineers baseball
- Conference: Big 12 Conference
- Record: 36-22 (12-11 Big 12)
- Head coach: Randy Mazey (4th season)
- Assistant coaches: Derek Matlock (4th season); Steve Sabins (1st season)
- Home stadium: Monongalia County Ballpark

2016 Big 12 Conference baseball standings
	Conf.						Overall
Team	W		L		T	PCT	W		L		T	PCT
No. 5 Texas Tech ‍†‍‍^{y}	19	–	5	–	0	.792	47	–	20	–	0	.701
No. 4 Oklahoma State ‍‍‍^{y}	16	–	8	–	0	.667	43	–	22	–	0	.662
No. 3 TCU ‍‍‡‍^{y}	15	–	9	–	0	.625	49	–	18	–	0	.731
West Virginia ‍‍‍	12	–	11	–	0	.522	36	–	22	–	0	.621
Oklahoma ‍‍‍	11	–	13	–	0	.458	30	–	27	–	1	.526
Baylor ‍‍‍	10	–	14	–	0	.417	24	–	29	–	0	.453
Texas ‍‍‍	10	–	14	–	0	.417	25	–	32	–	0	.439
Kansas State ‍‍‍	8	–	16	–	0	.333	26	–	31	–	0	.456
Kansas ‍‍‍	6	–	17	–	0	.261	20	–	35	–	1	.366
† – Conference champion ‡ – Tournament champion y – Invited to the NCAA tournament Rankings from Collegiate Baseball

The 2016 West Virginia Mountaineers baseball team represented West Virginia University during the 2016 NCAA Division I baseball season. The Mountaineers played their home games at Monongalia County Ballpark as a member of the Big 12 Conference.

== Previous season ==
In 2015, the Mountaineers finished the season 7th in the Big 12 with a record of 27–27 (9–13 Big 12). WVU qualified for the 2015 Big 12 Conference baseball tournament and were eliminated in the second round. They failed to qualify for the 2015 NCAA Division I baseball tournament.

== Personnel ==
=== Coaching staff ===
Name	Position	Seasons at WVU
Randy Mazey	Head coach	4
Derek Matlock	Assistant coach	4
Steve Sabins	Assistant coach	1

=== Roster ===
2016 West Virginia Mountaineers roster
Pitchers: 2 - Chad Donato - Junior; 4 - Cody Wood - Freshman; 5 - Brandon Boone - Junior; 7 - Jake Danner - Freshman; 11 - Nick Wernke - Sophomore; 15 - Conner Dotson - Sophomore; 18 - Ross Vance - Senior; 19 - Braden Zarbnisky - Freshman; 21 - Jacob Brewer - Freshman; 22 - Tanner Campbell - Freshman; 26 - Shane Ennis - Sophomore; 27 - Jeff Hardy - Junior; 29 - Michael Grove - Freshman; 33 - BJ Myers - Sophomore; 34 - Seth Jordan - Sophomore; 36 - Blake Smith - Senior; 47 - Endy Morales - Freshman; 55 - Jacob Potock - Freshman; 55 - Jackson Sigman - Junior	Catchers: 0 - Chase Illig - Freshman; 32 - Ivan Vera - Freshman; 42 - Ray Guerrini - Junior; Infielders: 8 - Shaun Corso - Sophomore; 9 - Kyle Gray - Freshman; 13 - Jackson Cramer - Junior; 25 - Marques Inman - Freshman; 28 - Cole Austin - Freshman; 31 - Tucker Cascadden - Freshman; 40 - Kyle Davis - Sophomore; 45 - Andrew Zitel - Freshman; 46 - Jimmy Galusky - (redshirt) Freshman	Outfielders: 7 - KC Huth - Senior; 12 - TJ Lake - Freshman; 19 - Kyle Casserly - Sophomore; 19 - Braden Zarbnisky - Freshman; 23 - Caleb Potter - Sophomore; 31 - Darius Hill - Freshman; 40 - Tate Brock - Freshman; 44 - Shaun Wood - Junior

== Schedule and results ==
2016 West Virginia Mountaineers baseball game log
Regular season
February

Date	Time (ET)	TV	Opponent	Rank	Site/stadium	Score	Win	Loss	Save	Attendance	Overall	Big 12
February 19	4:00 pm		at Charleston Southern*		Buccaneer Ballpark • North Charleston, SC	**L** 3–4	Raynor (1–0)	**Donato** (0–1)	Hubbard (1)	240	0–1	–
February 20	2:00 pm		at Charleston Southern*		Buccaneer Ballpark • North Charleston, SC	**W** 5–0	**Vance** (1–0)	Johnson (0–1)	–	346	1–1	–
February 21	1:00 pm		at Charleston Southern*		Buccaneer Ballpark • North Charleston, SC	**W** 3–0	**Myers** (1–0)	Piriz (0–1)	**Smith** (1)	350	2–1	–
February 26	9:00 pm		at UNLV*		Earl Wilson Stadium • Paradise, NV	**W** 9–6	**Dotson** (1–0)	Bohall (1–1)	–	1,666	3–1	–
February 27	5:00 pm		at UNLV*		Earl Wilson Stadium • Paradise, NV	**W** 13–1	**Vance** (2–0)	Kremer (0–1)	–	906	4–1	–
February 28	4:00 pm		at UNLV*		Earl Wilson Stadium • Paradise, NV	**W** 9–4	**Myers** (2–0)	Oakley (0–2)	–	1,076	5–1	–

March

Date	Time (ET)	TV	Opponent	Rank	Site/stadium	Score	Win	Loss	Save	Attendance	Overall	Big 12
March 3	11:35 pm		at Hawaii*		Les Murakami Stadium • Honolulu, HI	**L** 1–4	Hornung (2–2)	**Donato** (0–2)	Culp (2)	2,392	5–2	–
March 4	11:35 pm		at Hawaii*		Les Murakami Stadium • Honolulu, HI	**W** 4–1	**Vance** (3–0)	Von Ruden (1–1)	**Grove** (1)	2,911	6–2	–
March 5	11:35 pm		at Hawaii*		Les Murakami Stadium • Honolulu, HI	**L** 2–6	Hatch (1–1)	**Myers** (2–1)	–	3,585	6–3	–
March 6	6:05 pm		at Hawaii*		Les Murakami Stadium • Honolulu, HI	**W** 9–2	**Dotson** (2–0)	Pigg (0–2)	–	2,775	7–3	–
March 11	3:00 pm		Old Dominion*		Monongalia County Ballpark • Granville, WV	**W** 4–3	**Dotson** (3–0)	Lamb (1–1)	**Smith** (1)	1,135	8–3	–
March 12	3:00 pm		Old Dominion*		Monongalia County Ballpark • Granville, WV	**L** 4–5^{10}	Hartman (2–0)	**Grove** (0–1)	Maguire (1)	1,319	8–4	–
March 12	7:15 pm		Old Dominion*		Monongalia County Ballpark • Granville, WV	**W** 5–4^{12}	**Zarbnisky** (1–0)	Hartman (1–1)	–	1,319	9–4	–
March 15	3:00 pm		Radford*		Monongalia County Ballpark • Granville, WV	**W** 6–2	**Campbell** (1–0)	Swarmer (0–2)	–	808	10–4	–
March 18	7:30 pm		at #11 TCU		Lupton Stadium • Fort Worth, TX	**L** 6–10	Wymer (1–0)	**Grove** (0–2)	–	4,379	10–5	0–1
March 19	4:00 pm		at #11 TCU		Lupton Stadium • Fort Worth, TX	**L** 1–7	Howard (4–0)	**Vance** (3–1)	–	4,364	10–6	0–2
March 20	2:00 pm		at #11 TCU		Lupton Stadium • Fort Worth, TX	**L** 2–14^{7}	Hill (2–1)	**Myers** (2–2)	–	4,190	10–7	0–3
March 22	6:30 pm		at Penn State*		Lubrano Park • University Park, PA	**L** 4–5	Forsyth (1–1)	**Dotson** (3–1)	Anderson (5)	682	10–8	–
March 25	7:00 pm	ESPN3	at Kansas		Hoglund Ballpark • Lawrence, KS	**W** 1–0	**Donato** (1–2)	Krauth (1–4)	**Smith** (3)	900	11–8	1–3
March 26	3:00 pm	ESPN3	at Kansas		Hoglund Ballpark • Lawrence, KS	**W** 11–6	**Dotson** (4–1)	Goldsberry (0–3)	**Hardy** (1)	826	12–8	2–3
March 29	6:30 pm		Canisius*		Monongalia County Ballpark • Granville, WV	**L** 5–7^{10}	Smith (2–1)	**Dotson** (4–2)	Remillard (5)	1,212	12–9	–
March 30	3:00 pm		Canisius*		Monongalia County Ballpark • Granville, WV	**L** 0–9	Hunt (1–0)	**Campbell** (1–1)	–	892	12–10	–

April

Date	Time (ET)	TV	Opponent	Rank	Site/stadium	Score	Win	Loss	Save	Attendance	Overall	Big 12
April 1	6:30 pm		Oklahoma State		Monongalia County Ballpark • Granville, WV	**W** 5–4^{10}	**Smith** (1–0)	Battenfield (1–1)	–	1,818	13–10	3–3
April 2	4:00 pm		Oklahoma State		Monongalia County Ballpark • Granville, WV	**W** 4–3	**Vance** (4–1)	Cobb (3–4)	**Dotson** (1)	1,467	14–10	4–3
April 3	1:00 pm		Oklahoma State		Monongalia County Ballpark • Granville, WV	**L** 1–8	Elliott (3–1)	**Myers** (2–3)	–	951	14–11	4–4
April 5	6:00 pm		at Marshall*		Appalachian Power Park • Charleston, WV	**W** 5–4^{10}	**Smith** (2–0)	Murphy (3–2)	–	1,678	15–11	–
April 6	6:30 pm		Eastern Michigan*		Monongalia County Ballpark • Granville, WV	**W** 5–1	**Campbell** (2–1)	Wilson (1–2)	**Hardy** (2)	830	16–11	–
April 8	6:30 pm		Furman*		Monongalia County Ballpark • Granville, WV	**L** 3–7	Gaddis (5–2)	**Donato** (1–3)	–	753	16–12	–
April 10	11:00 am		Furman*		Monongalia County Ballpark • Granville, WV	**L** 6–8	Fondu (2–1)	**Smith** (2–1)	Mullen (4)	675	16–13	–
April 10	3:15 pm		Furman*		Monongalia County Ballpark • Granville, WV	**W** 8–5	**Myers** (3–3)	Quarles (3–3)	**Brewer** (1)	675	17–13	–
April 12	6:30 pm		Pittsburgh*		Monongalia County Ballpark • Granville, WV							
April 15	6:30 pm		Kansas State		Monongalia County Ballpark • Granville, WV							
April 16	4:00 pm		Kansas State		Monongalia County Ballpark • Granville, WV							
April 17	1:00 pm		Kansas State		Monongalia County Ballpark • Granville, WV							
April 19	6:30 pm		Youngstown State*		Monongalia County Ballpark • Granville, WV							
April 22	7:00 pm		at Oklahoma		L. Dale Mitchell Baseball Park • Norman, OK							
April 23	3:00 pm		at Oklahoma		L. Dale Mitchell Baseball Park • Norman, OK							
April 24	2:00 pm		at Oklahoma		L. Dale Mitchell Baseball Park • Norman, OK							
April 26	6:30 pm		Marshall*		Monongalia County Ballpark • Granville, WV							
April 29	6:30 pm		Baylor		Monongalia County Ballpark • Granville, WV							
April 30	4:00 pm		Baylor		Monongalia County Ballpark • Granville, WV							

May

Date	Time (ET)	TV	Opponent	Rank	Site/stadium	Score	Win	Loss	Save	Attendance	Overall	Big 12
May 1	1:00 pm		Baylor		Monongalia County Ballpark • Granville, WV							
May 3	6:30 pm		Virginia Tech*		Monongalia County Ballpark • Granville, WV							
May 6	6:30 pm		Texas		Monongalia County Ballpark • Granville, WV							
May 7	4:00 pm		Texas		Monongalia County Ballpark • Granville, WV							
May 8	1:00 pm		Texas		Monongalia County Ballpark • Granville, WV							
May 10	6:30 pm		Maryland*		Monongalia County Ballpark • Granville, WV							
May 13	7:00 pm		William & Mary*		Monongalia County Ballpark • Granville, WV							
May 14	4:00 pm		William & Mary*		Monongalia County Ballpark • Granville, WV							
May 15	1:00 pm		William & Mary*		Monongalia County Ballpark • Granville, WV							
May 17	6:30 pm		at Pittsburgh*		Petersen Sports Complex • Pittsburgh, PA							
May 19	7:30 pm		at Texas Tech		Dan Law Field at Rip Griffin Park • Lubbock, TX							
May 20	3:00 pm		at Texas Tech		Dan Law Field at Rip Griffin Park • Lubbock, TX							
May 21	2:00 pm		at Texas Tech		Dan Law Field at Rip Griffin Park • Lubbock, TX							

Post-season
Big 12 Tournament

Date	Time (ET)	TV	Opponent	Rank	Site/stadium	Score	Win	Loss	Save	Attendance	Overall	Big 12 Tourn.
May 25	TBD		TBD		Chickasaw Bricktown Ballpark • Oklahoma City, OK							
May 26	TBD		TBD		Chickasaw Bricktown Ballpark • Oklahoma City, OK							

Legend: = Win = Loss Bold = West Virginia team member
All rankings from Collegiate Baseball.
