= 2016 TCU Horned Frogs baseball team =

American college baseball season

2016 TCU Horned Frogs baseball

Big 12 Tournament champions NCAA Fort Worth Regional champions NCAA College Station Super Regional champions

College World Series, L, 2–2
- Conference: Big 12 Conference

Ranking
- Coaches: No. 3
- Record: 49–18 (15–9 Big 12)
- Head coach: Jim Schlossnagle (13th season)
- Assistant coaches: Bill Mosiello (3rd season); Kirk Saarloos (4th season); Zach Etheredge (3rd season); Josh Elander (1st season)
- Home stadium: Lupton Stadium

2016 Big 12 Conference baseball standings
	Conf.						Overall
Team	W		L		T	PCT	W		L		T	PCT
No. 5 Texas Tech ‍†‍‍^{y}	19	–	5	–	0	.792	47	–	20	–	0	.701
No. 4 Oklahoma State ‍‍‍^{y}	16	–	8	–	0	.667	43	–	22	–	0	.662
No. 3 TCU ‍‍‡‍^{y}	15	–	9	–	0	.625	49	–	18	–	0	.731
West Virginia ‍‍‍	12	–	11	–	0	.522	36	–	22	–	0	.621
Oklahoma ‍‍‍	11	–	13	–	0	.458	30	–	27	–	1	.526
Baylor ‍‍‍	10	–	14	–	0	.417	24	–	29	–	0	.453
Texas ‍‍‍	10	–	14	–	0	.417	25	–	32	–	0	.439
Kansas State ‍‍‍	8	–	16	–	0	.333	26	–	31	–	0	.456
Kansas ‍‍‍	6	–	17	–	0	.261	20	–	35	–	1	.366
† – Conference champion ‡ – Tournament champion y – Invited to the NCAA tournament Rankings from Collegiate Baseball

The 2016 TCU Horned Frogs baseball team represented Texas Christian University during the 2016 NCAA Division I baseball season. The Horned Frogs played their home games at Charlie & Marie Lupton Baseball Stadium as a member of the Big 12 Conference. They were led by head coach Jim Schlossnagle, the winningest coach in TCU baseball history, in his 13th year at TCU.

== Previous season ==
The 2015 TCU Horned Frogs baseball team notched a 51–15 (18–5) regular season record and were the regular season Big 12 Conference champions. For the second consecutive year, the Horned Frogs were selected as the #7 national seed in the NCAA tournament, and the Frogs were selected to host an NCAA Regional against NC State, Stony Brook and Sacred Heart at their home park. In the decisive Fort Worth Regional championship game, TCU trailed NC State in an 8–1 ballgame entering the bottom of the 8th inning. TCU plated 6 unearned runs in the bottom of the 8th, tied the game in the bottom of the 9th, and clinched the game with a walk-off run in the bottom of the 10th to win the Regional championship and advance to host the Fort Worth Super Regional over Texas A&M. TCU won the Fort Worth Super Regional over the Aggies with a walk-off run in the bottom of the 16th inning of the decisive game 3, earning the Frogs a trip to the 2015 College World Series. At the College World Series, TCU reached the national semifinal and notched a 2–2 record with two wins over LSU and two losses to Vanderbilt. TCU finished the season ranked #4.

== Preseason ==
=== 2015 MLB draft ===
Eight Horned Frogs from the 2015 roster were drafted in the 2015 MLB draft. Redshirt Junior RHP Mitchell Traver was selected by the St. Louis Cardinals in the 28th round and elected to return to TCU for the 2016 season. The following 7 drafted players departed the program for Major League Baseball after TCU's College World Series appearance:

List of Drafted Players
Name	2015 Class	Pos.	Team	Round	No.
Alex Young	Junior	LHP	Arizona Diamondbacks	2	43
Tyler Alexander	Sophomore	LHP	Detroit Tigers	2	65
Riley Ferrell	Junior	RHP	Houston Astros	3	79
Cody Jones	Senior	OF	Kansas City Royals	6	189
Preston Morrison	Senior	RHP	Chicago Cubs	8	233
Trey Teakell	RS Senior	RHP	Detroit Tigers	9	280
Keaton Jones	Senior	INF	Detroit Tigers	15	460

=== Departed players ===
In addition to the 7 players that departed after being drafted in the 2015 MLB Draft, 4 seniors graduated and 5 other players departed the program:

List of Departed Players
Name	2015 Class	Pos.	Reason
Bradley Barnett	Freshman	INF	Transferred to Grayson College
Connor Beck	RS Freshman	OF	Transferred to Midland College
Garrett Crain	Senior	INF	Graduated
Travis Evans	Senior	LHP	Graduated
Jeremie Fagnan	Senior	OF	Graduated
Matt Myers	Freshman	RHP	Departed
Derek Odell	Senior	INF	Graduated
Connor Reich	Freshman	RHP	Transferred to Navarro College
Cullen Vaught	Freshman	C	Departed

=== Recruits and transfers ===
The Horned Frogs' 2015 recruiting and transfer class was led by 2015 Gatorade National Player of the Year, Luken Baker. The 18 new players for 2016 include the following 13 freshmen and 5 junior transfers:

List of New Recruits & incoming transfers
Name	2016 Class	Pos.	Previous Schools
Zach Alaniz	Freshman	OF	Carroll H.S. (Corpus Christi, TX)
Luken Baker	Freshman	RHP/INF	Oak Ridge H.S. (Conroe, TX)
Austin Boyles	Freshman	RHP	Klein Collins H.S. (Spring, TX)
Dalton Brown	Freshman	RHP	Arlington Heights H.S. (Fort Worth, TX)
Durbin Feltman	Freshman	RHP	Oak Ridge H.S. (Conroe, TX)
Trent Franson	Freshman	INF	Lutheran South Academy (Houston, TX)
Mason Hesse	Junior	INF	Navarro College; Temple H.S. (Temple, TX)
Rex Hill	Junior	LHP	San Jacinto College; Texas A&M; Tomball H.S. (Tomball, TX)
Dalton Horton	Freshman	LHP	Center H.S. (Center, TX)
Ryan Johnson	Freshman	OF	College Station H.S. (College Station, TX)
Dillon Meadows	Freshman	RHP	Paradise H.S. (Paradise, TX)
Ryan Merrill	Junior	INF	Iowa Western C.C.; Millard West H.S. (Omaha, NE)
Shane Mosiello	Freshman	LHP	Aledo H.S. (Aledo, TX)
Devon Roedahl	Freshman	RHP	West Brook Sr. H.S. (Beaumont, TX)
Mitch Sewald	Junior	RHP	LSU–Eunice; LSU; Rummel H.S. (Metairie, LA)
Cam Warner	Junior	INF	Hill College; UC Senior Secondary College Lake Ginninderra (Canberra, Australia)
Josh Watson	Freshman	OF	Martin H.S. (Arlington, TX)
Sean Wymer	Freshman	RHP	Flower Mound H.S. (Flower Mound, TX)

=== Season projections ===
Coming off back-to-back College World Series appearances in 2014 and 2015, TCU entered the 2016 season ranked as high as #11 in preseason polls. The Horned Frogs were voted as the favorite to win the regular season Big 12 title in the preseason Big 12 coaches' poll. College baseball writers for D1 Baseball, Baseball America, and Perfect Game all selected the Frogs to finish second in the Big 12, behind Oklahoma State.

In-depth preseason TCU previews were compiled by and are available from: D1 Baseball (podcast), Baseball America and Perfect Game.

In-depth preseason Big 12 previews were compiled by and are available from: D1 Baseball, Baseball America and Perfect Game.

Before the start of the season, D1 Baseball projected the Frogs as one of the 16 NCAA tournament Regional hosts. Baseball America projected TCU as a 2-seed in a Houston Regional, and two of their four writers projected TCU freshman Luken Baker would be named Freshman of the Year.

== Personnel ==
=== Roster ===
2016 TCU Horned Frogs baseball team
Players
Coaches

#	Pos.	Name	B/T	Height	Weight	Year	Previous school	Home town
1	INF	Mason Hesse	R/R	5 ft 9 in (1.75 m)	155 lb (70 kg)	Jr	Navarro College	Temple, TX
3	INF	Elliott Barzilli	R/R	6 ft 1 in (1.85 m)	175 lb (79 kg)	Jr	Georgia Tech	Los Angeles, CA
4	INF	Cam Warner	R/R	6 ft 2 in (1.88 m)	188 lb (85 kg)	Jr	Hill College	Canberra, Australia
5	INF	Ryan Merrill	L/R	5 ft 11 in (1.8 m)	185 lb (84 kg)	Jr	Iowa Western C.C.	Omaha, NE
6	OF	Nolan Brown (injured)	L/L	5 ft 11 in (1.8 m)	175 lb (79 kg)	Sr	Blinn College	Colleyville, TX
7	OF	Josh Watson	S/R	5 ft 11 in (1.8 m)	195 lb (88 kg)	Fr	Arlington Martin, H.S.	Arlington, TX
8	OF	Austen Wade	L/L	6 ft 1 in (1.85 m)	185 lb (84 kg)	So	Midland H.S.	Midland, TX
9	C	Evan Skoug	L/R	5 ft 11 in (1.8 m)	200 lb (91 kg)	So	Libertyville H.S.	Libertyville, IL
10	OF	Dane Steinhagen	R/R	6 ft 1 in (1.85 m)	190 lb (86 kg)	Sr	Howard College	Beaumont, TX
11	LHP	Dalton Horton	L/L	6 ft 4 in (1.93 m)	210 lb (95 kg)	Fr	Center H.S.	Center, TX
12	LHP	Rex Hill	L/L	6 ft 3 in (1.91 m)	200 lb (91 kg)	Jr	San Jacinto College	Tomball, TX
13	INF	Michael Landestoy	R/R	6 ft 3 in (1.91 m)	195 lb (88 kg)	RS So	Saint George School	Santo Domingo, D.R.
15	RHP	Durbin Feltman	R/R	6 ft 0 in (1.83 m)	190 lb (86 kg)	Fr	Oak Ridge, H.S.	Conroe, TX
16	INF	Connor Wanhanen	L/R	6 ft 2 in (1.88 m)	195 lb (88 kg)	So	Flower Mound H.S.	Flower Mound, TX
17	LHP	Ryan Burnett	L/L	6 ft 2 in (1.88 m)	208 lb (94 kg)	RS So	The Woodlands H.S.	The Woodlands, TX
18	OF	Zach Alaniz	L/L	5 ft 6 in (1.68 m)	155 lb (70 kg)	Fr	Carroll H.S.	Corpus Christi, TX
19	RHP	Luken Baker (injured)	R/R	6 ft 4 in (1.93 m)	265 lb (120 kg)	Fr	Oak Ridge, H.S.	Spring, TX
20	RHP	Preston Guillory	R/R	6 ft 3 in (1.91 m)	200 lb (91 kg)	Sr	Panola College	Watson, LA
21	RHP	Brian Trieglaff	R/R	6 ft 1 in (1.85 m)	190 lb (86 kg)	RS Jr	Houston Christian H.S.	Houston, TX
23	RHP	Devon Roedahl	R/R	6 ft 1 in (1.85 m)	210 lb (95 kg)	Fr	West Brook H.S.	Beaumont, TX
25	INF	Trent Franson	R/R	5 ft 10 in (1.78 m)	180 lb (82 kg)	Fr	Lutheran South Academy	Houston, TX
26	RHP	Sean Wymer	R/R	6 ft 1 in (1.85 m)	190 lb (86 kg)	Fr	Flower Mound H.S.	Flower Mound, TX
27	OF	Evan Williams (injured)	L/R	6 ft 0 in (1.83 m)	175 lb (79 kg)	Sr	McLennan C.C.	McKinney, TX
31	RHP	Dalton Brown	R/R	6 ft 1 in (1.85 m)	204 lb (93 kg)	Fr	Arlington Heights H.S.	Benbrook, TX
32	OF	Ryan Johnson	L/R	6 ft 3 in (1.91 m)	205 lb (93 kg)	Fr	College Station H.S.	College Station, TX
33	RHP	Mitchell Traver	R/R	6 ft 7 in (2.01 m)	255 lb (116 kg)	RS Jr	Houston Christian H.S.	Sugar Land, TX
34	RHP	Mitch Sewald	R/R	6 ft 6 in (1.98 m)	225 lb (102 kg)	Jr	LSU Eunice	New Orleans, LA
35	RHP	Dillon Meadows	R/R	6 ft 1 in (1.85 m)	185 lb (84 kg)	Fr	Paradise H.S.	Paradise, TX
37	RHP	Austin Boyles	R/R	6 ft 2 in (1.88 m)	187 lb (85 kg)	Fr	Klein Collins H.S.	Spring, TX
38	C	Zack Plunkett	R/R	6 ft 2 in (1.88 m)	205 lb (93 kg)	So	L.D. Bell H.S.	Hurst, TX
39	LHP	Shane Mosiello	L/L	6 ft 5 in (1.96 m)	170 lb (77 kg)	Fr	Aledo H.S.	Aledo, TX
41	RHP	Jared Janczak	R/R	6 ft 1 in (1.85 m)	205 lb (93 kg)	RS Fr	Belton H.S.	Belton, TX
44	RHP	Brian Howard	R/R	6 ft 9 in (2.06 m)	185 lb (84 kg)	Jr	St. Louis University H.S.	St. Louis, MO
47	LHP	Drew Gooch	L/L	5 ft 10 in (1.78 m)	195 lb (88 kg)	So	Argyle H.S.	Argyle, TX

Head coach

Jim Schlossnagle

Assistant coach(es)

Bill Mosiello
Kirk Saarloos
Zach Etheredge
Josh Elander

Legend

- (C) Team captain
- (S) Suspended
- (I) Ineligible
- Injured
- Current redshirt

Roster
Last update: January 22, 2016

=== Injuries ===
Player	Status	Injury	Date of Injury	Date of Return (Anticipated)
Luken Baker	Limited/Injured	Muscle strain (forearm)	April 22	(did not pitch; remained as DH)
Nolan Brown	Out/Redshirt	Hamate bone fracture	Preseason	(missed entire season)
Evan Williams	Out/Redshirt	Broken collarbone	Preseason	(missed entire season)
Connor Wanhanen	Returned	Hamstring	March 11	Returned March 22
Ryan Burnett	Returned	Unknown, lower body	March 12	Returned March 26
Brian Howard	Returned	Soreness (arm)	April 7	Returned April 16
Mitchell Traver	Returned	Muscle strain (back)	February 12	Returned May 8

=== Coaching staff ===
TCU returned its entire coaching staff from the Frogs' 2014 and 2015 College World Series seasons. The Frogs also added former TCU student Josh Elander as a student assistant coach.

Name	Position	Season at TCU	Alma mater
Jim Schlossnagle	Head coach	13	Elon University (1992)
Bill Mosiello	Associate head coach	3	Fresno State University (1986)
Kirk Saarloos	Assistant coach	4	California State University, Fullerton (2001)
Zach Etheredge	Volunteer Assistant Coach	3	University of Texas at San Antonio (2008)
Josh Elander	Student Assistant Coach	1	Texas Christian University (2012)

=== Schlossnagle milestones ===
On February 21, 2016, TCU Head Coach Jim Schlossnagle became the winningest coach in TCU baseball history with his 518th win; Schlossngale passed former TCU letterman and head coach Lance Brown to become the Frogs' all-time winningest coach.

== Regular season ==
In time for the start of the 2016 regular season, TCU debuted the latest in its baseball facilities additions with the opening of the new $8 million left field line complex at Charlie & Marie Lupton Baseball Stadium, which houses the TCU home locker room, team classroom, team lounge, sports medicine center, equipment room, and coaches' offices (photo gallery). The 2016 season will also debut the addition of a new video board in left field and an expanded right field berm for general admission patrons. The new left field line facility and video board are in addition to the $2.5 million indoor hitting/pitching facility and turf practice area that opened immediately before the 2015 regular season.

Before the Opening Day, the Horned Frogs kicked off the 2016 season with the annual First Pitch Banquet on February 12, hosted by two former TCU players: Jake Arrieta, a starting pitcher for the Chicago Cubs and the 2015 National League Cy Young Award winner, and Matt Carpenter, the starting third baseman for the St. Louis Cardinals and a two-time MLB All-Star. The varsity Horned Frogs hosted over 60 TCU baseball alumni for the annual Alumni Game on February 13; at least 15 current professional baseball players took the field for the alumni team.

The team's theme for the 2016 season, portrayed in the program's annual introductory video, is "Uncommon."

=== February ===
The Horned Frogs opened the 2016 season at home versus Loyola Marymount on February 19, 2016. The Frogs' Friday night ace pitcher missed the early weeks of the season after a muscle strain injury on February 12. Senior starting center fielder and leadoff hitter Nolan Brown was also out of the lineup in the opening weeks after undergoing surgery for a hamate bone injury in January. The Frogs won their opening series against Loyola Marymount two games to one, and Jim Schlossnagle became the all-time winningest coach in TCU baseball history in the series finale on February 21, 2016. TCU competed at the Shrines Hospitals for Children College Classic at Minute Maid Park in Houston, from February 26 through February 28; the Frogs knocked off three ranked teams (Louisiana–Lafayette, Rice and Houston) to extend their winning streak to 6 games at the close of February. The Frogs were named Tournament champions, and three Frogs earned four All-Tournament Team honors.

=== March ===
TCU entered the month of March with a 6–1 record, ranked as high as #7 in national polls. The Frogs opened the month by run-ruling UTRGV 13–0 in just 7 innings; the lopsided shutout marked the Frogs' second run-rule win of the year and extended their win streak to 7 games. After seeing their winning streak snapped in the series opener versus Gonzaga in a 5–4 loss, TCU rebounded to blast Gonzaga 10–2 and 16–1; the Frogs notched 13 extra-base hits in their two wins over Gonzaga, Big 12 leading hitter Elliott Barzilli raised his season batting average to .512, and in the Sunday series finale, all nine batters in the initial lineup had at least one hit.

== Postseason ==
=== Big 12 tournament ===
For the second time in three years, the Horned Frogs won the Big 12 Conference's automatic berth to the NCAA tournament by winning the Big 12 Conference Tournament at Bricktown Ballpark in Oklahoma City, OK. After the Big 12 Tournament, the Frogs had won 9 of their last 10 games.

=== Fort Worth Regional ===
For the sixth time in eight years, TCU was selected as one of sixteen NCAA tournament Regional hosts. The Horned Frogs drew two-seed Arizona State, three-seed Gonzaga, and four-seed Oral Roberts. The winner of the Fort Worth Regional will face the winner of the college Station Regional, setting up a potential 2015 Super Regional rematch between TCU and Texas A&M.

The Horned Frogs opened the 2016 NCAA tournament with a 7–0 win over Oral Roberts.

=== College Station Super Regional ===
The Horned Frogs faced the Aggies in an NCAA Super Regional for the second consecutive year. The Horned Frogs captured game one of the series in College Station with a dominant 8–2 victory, lost game two, and won game three to advance to the College World Series.

=== College World Series ===
TCU advanced to the College World Series for the third consecutive year and will face Texas Tech in game one, a rematch of their opening game in the 2014 College World Series.

== Schedule and results ==
TCU announced its 2016 schedule on October 5, 2015. TCU's original 55-game slate expected the Horned Frogs to play 30 home games, 22 road games, and 3 neutral site contests. The schedule was highlighted by 15 games against 2015 postseason participants. The official schedule and game/player statistics are available at GoFrogs.com.

2016 TCU Horned Frogs Baseball Schedule & Results
Regular season
February

Date	Time (CT)	TV	Opponent	Rank	Site/stadium	Score	Win	Loss	Save	Attendance	Overall	Big 12	
February 19	6:30 pm		Loyola Marymount*	#15	Lupton Stadium • Fort Worth, TX	**L** 3–5	Redman (1–0)	**Janczak** (0–1)	–	5,116	0–1	–	Stats; Story
February 20	2:00 pm		Loyola Marymount*	#15	Lupton Stadium • Fort Worth, TX	**W** 1–0	**Howard** (1–0)	Abbott (0–1)	**Trieglaff** (1)	4,509	1–1	–	Stats; Story
February 21	11:30 am		Loyola Marymount*	#15	Lupton Stadium • Fort Worth, TX	**W** 5–0	**Baker** (1–0)	Cohen (0–1)	–	3,687	2 –1	–	Stats; Story
February 24	6:30 pm		Arkansas–Pine Bluff*	#15	Lupton Stadium • Fort Worth, TX	**W** 17–3	**Roedahl** (1–0)	Estep (0–2)	–	3,573	3–1	–	Stats; Story
February 26	4:05 pm	MLBN/ RSSW	#6 Louisiana–Lafayette*	#15	Minute Maid Park • Houston, TX (Shriners Hospitals for Children College Classic)	**W** 7–1	**Howard** (2–0)	Leger (0–1)	–	5,335	4–1	–	Stats; Story
February 27	8:35 pm	MLBN/ RSSW	#25 Rice*	#15	Minute Maid Park • Houston, TX (Shriners Hospitals for Children College Classic)	**W** 10–0^{7}	**Baker** (2–0)	Salinas (0–1)	–	7,881	5–1	–	Stats; Story
February 28	4:05 pm	MLBN/ RSSW	#16 Houston*	#15	Minute Maid Park • Houston, TX (Shriners Hospitals for Children College Classic)	**W** 10–1	**Janczak** (1–1)	Ullcom (1–1)	–	6,516	6–1	–	Stats; Story

March

Date	Time (CT)	TV	Opponent	Rank	Site/stadium	Score	Win	Loss	Save	Attendance	Overall	Big 12	
March 1	6:30 pm	FCS	UTRGV*	#9	Lupton Stadium • Fort Worth, TX	**W** 13–0^{7}	**Horton** (1–0)	Kufrovich (0–1)	–	3,566	7–1	–	Stats; Story
March 4	6:30 pm	FSSW+	Gonzaga*	#9	Lupton Stadium • Fort Worth, TX	**L** 3–4	Bailey (2–0)	**Guillory** (0–1)	Bies (1)	3,801	7–2	–	Stats; Story
March 5	2:00 pm		Gonzaga*	#9	Lupton Stadium • Fort Worth, TX	**W** 10–2	**Howard** (3–0)	Vernia (0–2)	–	3,875	8–2	–	Stats; Story
March 6	1:00 pm		Gonzaga*	#9	Lupton Stadium • Fort Worth, TX	**W** 16–1	**Hill** (1–0)	Morgan (1–1)	–	3,723	9–2	–	Stats; Story
March 8	5:30 pm		Texas–Arlington*	#11	Lupton Stadium • Fort Worth, TX	**W** 5–1	**Horton** (2–0)	Schneider (0–1)	–	3,895	10–2	–	Stats; Story
March 11	6:30 pm		USC*	#11	Lupton Stadium • Fort Worth, TX	**W** 8–3	**Janczak** (2–1)	Davis (2–2)	–	3,597	11–2	–	Stats; Story
March 12	2:00 pm		USC*	#11	Lupton Stadium • Fort Worth, TX	**W** 12–11^{10}	**Trieglaff** (1–0)	Kriske (0–1)	–	4,209	12–2	–	Stats; Story
March 13	1:00 pm	FSSW	USC*	#11	Lupton Stadium • Fort Worth, TX	**L** 6–16	Wegman (1–0)	**Hill** (1–1)	–	4,765	12–3	–	Stats; Story
March 15	6:30 pm		at Rice*	#11	Reckling Park • Houston, TX	**W** 6–4	**Trieglaff** (2–0)	Myers (1–1)	–	3,406	13–3	–	Stats; Story
March 18	6:30 pm		West Virginia	#11	Lupton Stadium • Fort Worth, TX	**W** 10–6	**Wymer** (1–0)	Grove (0–2)	–	4,379	14–3	1–0	Stats; Story
March 19	3:00 pm		West Virginia	#11	Lupton Stadium • Fort Worth, TX	**W** 7–1	**Howard** (4–0)	Vance (3–1)	–	4,364	15–3	2–0	Stats; Story
March 20	1:00 pm		West Virginia	#11	Lupton Stadium • Fort Worth, TX	**W** 14–2^{7}	**Hill** (2–1)	Myers (2–2)	–	4,190	16–3	3–0	Stats; Story
March 22	6:30 pm	FSSW+	Abilene Christian*	#9	Lupton Stadium • Fort Worth, TX	**W** 6–4	**Horton** (3–0)	Cole (1–3)	**Feltman** (1)	4,038	17–3	–	Stats; Story
March 24	6:00 pm	LHN	at Texas	#9	UFCU Disch–Falk Field • Austin, TX	**L** 3–4	Duke (2–1)	**Baker** (2–1)	Mayes (1)	4,828	17–4	3–1	Stats; Story
March 25	6:00 pm	LHN	at Texas	#9	UFCU Disch–Falk Field • Austin, TX	**L** 0–2	Culbreth (4–2)	**Howard** (4–1)	Mayes (2)	4,004	17–5	3–2	Stats; Story
March 26	2:30 pm	FS1	at Texas	#9	UFCU Disch–Falk Field • Austin, TX	**W** 9–5	**Burnett** (1–0)	Kingham (1–2)	–	7,093	18–5	4–2	Stats; Story
March 29	6:30 pm		at Texas–Arlington*	#15	Clay Gould Ballpark • Arlington, TX	**W** 17–4	**Janczak** (3–1)	Vassar (1–1)	–	1,196	19–5	–	Stats; Story

April

Date	Time (CT)	TV	Opponent	Rank	Site/stadium	Score	Win	Loss	Save	Attendance	Overall	Big 12	
April 1	6:30 pm	ESPN3	at Wichita State*	#15	Eck Stadium • Wichita, KS	**W** 3–0	**Jancak** (4–1)	Schwanke (4–3)	–	2,105	20–5	–	Stats; Story
April 2	1:00 pm	ESPNU	at Wichita State*	#15	Eck Stadium • Wichita, KS	**W** 17–6	**Trieglaff** (3–0)	Hayes (0–3)	–	2,995	21–5	–	Stats; Story
April 3	1:00 pm	ESPN3	at Wichita State*	#15	Eck Stadium • Wichita, KS	**W** 12–5	**Horton** (4–0)	Lewis (0–5)	–	2,554	22–5	–	Stats; Story
April 6	6:30 pm	FSSW+	Texas–Arlington*	#10	Lupton Stadium • Fort Worth, TX	**L** 3–4	Wilcox (2–2)	**Hill** (2–2)	Moreland (1)	3,892	22–6	–	Stats; Story
April 8	6:00 pm	ESPN3	at Kansas	#10	Hoglund Ballpark • Lawrence, KS	**L** 4–5	Villines (3–1)	**Janczak** (4–2)	–	1,317	22–7	4–3	Stats; Story
April 9	6:00 pm	ESPN3	at Kansas	#10	Hoglund Ballpark • Lawrence, KS	**W** 8–0	**Horton** (5–0)	Weiman (1–3)	–	1,237	23–7	5–3	Stats; Story
April 10	1:00 pm	ESPN3	at Kansas	#10	Hoglund Ballpark • Lawrence, KS	**W** 14–6	**Trieglaff** (4–0)	Goldsberry (0–5)	–	1,311	24–7	6–3	Stats; Story
April 12	6:30 pm	FSSW+	Dallas Baptist*	#11	Lupton Stadium • Fort Worth, TX	**L** (1–9)	Stutzman (4–1)	**Burnett** (1–1)	–	3,851	24–8	–	Stats; Story
April 15	7:00 pm	FS1	Oklahoma	#11	Lupton Stadium • Fort Worth, TX	**W** 11–3	**Baker** (3–1)	Madden (1–3)	**Wymer** (1)	5,201	25–8	7–3	Stats; Story
April 16	11:00 am		Oklahoma	#11	Lupton Stadium • Fort Worth, TX	**W** 12–2^{7}	**Horton** (6–0)	Andritsos (4–3)	–	3,955	26–8	8–3	Stats; Story
April 16	3:00 pm	FSSW+	Oklahoma	#11	Lupton Stadium • Fort Worth, TX	**W** 2–0	**Howard** (5–1)	Elliott (0–1)	**Feltman** (2)	4,658	27–8	9–3	Stats; Story
April 22	6:00 pm	FCS	at Oklahoma State	#8	Reynolds Stadium • Stillwater, OK	**L** 0–9					27–9	9–4	Stats; Story
April 23	3:00 pm	FSSW+	at Oklahoma State	#8	Reynolds Stadium • Stillwater, OK	**W** 11–6					28–9	10–4	Stats; Story
April 24	1:00 pm	FCS	at Oklahoma State	#8	Reynolds Stadium • Stillwater, OK	**L** 7–11					28–10	10–5	Stats; Story
April 26	6:00 pm		at Dallas Baptist*		Horner Ballpark • Dallas, TX	**W** 2–0^{7}					29–10	–	Stats; Story
April 29	8:00 pm	FS1	Texas Tech		Lupton Stadium • Fort Worth, TX	**L** 3–7					29–11	10–6	
April 30	4:00 pm	FSSW+	Texas Tech		Lupton Stadium • Fort Worth, TX	**W** 13–6					30–11	11–6	

May

Date	Time (CT)	TV	Opponent	Rank	Site/stadium	Score	Win	Loss	Save	Attendance	Overall	Big 12
May 1	1:00 pm		Texas Tech		Lupton Stadium • Fort Worth, TX	**L** 1–3					30–12	11–7
May 7	12:00 pm		at Penn State*		Lubrano Park • University Park, PA	**W** 6–2					31–12	–
May 7	4:00 pm		at Penn State*		Lubrano Park • University Park, PA	**W** 5–4					32–12	–
May 8	12:00 pm		at Penn State*		Lubrano Park • University Park, PA	**W** 9–5					33–12	–
May 13	6:35 pm	FSSW+	at Baylor		Baylor Ballpark • Waco, TX	**L** 3–4					33–13	11–8
May 14	3:05 pm	FSSW	at Baylor		Baylor Ballpark • Waco, TX	**L** 5–8					33–14	11–9
May 15	1:05 pm	FSSW+	at Baylor		Baylor Ballpark • Waco, TX	**W** 7–3					34–14	12–9
May 17	6:30 pm		Stephen F. Austin*		Lupton Stadium • Fort Worth, TX	**W** 3–2					35–14	–
May 19	6:30 pm		Kansas State		Lupton Stadium • Fort Worth, TX	**W** 3–2					36–14	13–9
May 20	6:30 pm	FSSW+	Kansas State		Lupton Stadium • Fort Worth, TX	**W** 2–1					37–14	14–9
May 21	4:00 pm	FSSW	Kansas State		Lupton Stadium • Fort Worth, TX	**W** 9–3					38–14	15–9

Postseason
Big 12 Tournament

Date	Time (CT)	TV	Opponent	Rank	Site/stadium	Score	Win	Loss	Save	Attendance	Overall	Big 12 Tourn.
May 25	3:05 pm	FCS; FSSW+	Baylor		Bricktown Ballpark • Oklahoma City, OK	**W** 12–5					39–14	1–0
May 26	8:15 pm	FCS; FSSW+	Oklahoma State		Bricktown Ballpark • Oklahoma City, OK	**W** 13–5					40–14	2–0
May 27	12:30 pm	FCS; FSSW+	Texas		Bricktown Ballpark • Oklahoma City, OK	**L** 1–2					40–15	2–1
May 27	4:30 pm	FCS; FSSW+	Texas		Bricktown Ballpark • Oklahoma City, OK	**W** 8–2					41–15	3–1
May 28	1:00 pm	FSSW+	West Virginia		Bricktown Ballpark • Oklahoma City, OK (Big 12 Tournament championship)	**W** 11–10^{10}					42–15	3–1

NCAA Fort Worth Regional

Date	Time (CT)	TV	Opponent	Rank	Site/stadium	Score	Win	Loss	Save	Attendance	Overall	NCAA Tourn.	
June 3	7:45 pm	ESPNU	Oral Roberts	#13	Lupton Stadium • Fort Worth, TX	**W** 7–0	**Traver** (1–1)	Howe (6–5)	–	4,150	43–15	1–0	Stats; Story
June 4	6:30 pm	ESPN3	Gonzaga	#13	Lupton Stadium • Fort Worth, TX	**W** 4–3	**Burnett** (2–1)	Morgan (10–3)	**Feltman** (7)	4,319	44–15	2–0	
June 5	6:30 pm	ESPN3	Arizona State	#13	Lupton Stadium • Fort Worth, TX	**W** 8–1	**Howard** (8–2)	Erives (6–2)	–	4,331	45–15	3–0	

NCAA College Station Super Regional

Date	Time (CT)	TV	Opponent	Rank	Site/stadium	Score	Win	Loss	Save	Attendance	Overall	NCAA Tourn.	
June 10	8:00 pm	ESPN2	at #1 Texas A&M	#10	Olsen Field at Blue Bell Park • College Station, TX	**W** 8–2	**Janczak** (7–3)	Hill (9–2)	–	6,109	46–15	4–0	Stats; Story
June 11	8:00 pm	ESPN	at #1 Texas A&M	#10	Olsen Field at Blue Bell Park • College Station, TX	**L** 1–7	Simonds (11–3)	**Traver** (1–2)	–	6,073	46–16	4–1	
June 12	8:00 pm	ESPN2	at #1 Texas A&M	#10	Olsen Field at Blue Bell Park • College Station, TX	**W** 4–1	**Howard** (9–2)	Vinson (4–3)	**Feltman** (8)	6,068	47–16	5–1	

College World Series

Date	Time (CT)	TV	Opponent	Rank	Site/stadium	Score	Win	Loss	Save	Attendance	Overall	NCAA Tourn.		
June 19	2:00 pm	ESPNU	#4 Texas Tech	#3	TD Ameritrade Park • Omaha, NE	**W** 5–3	**Burnett** (3–1)	Dugger (6–1)	**Feltman** (9)	19,834	48–16	6–1	1–0	Stats; Story
June 21	8:00 pm	ESPN	#5 Coastal Carolina	#3	TD Ameritrade Park • Omaha, NE	**W** 6–1	**Howard** (10–2)	Cunningham (9–4)	**Burnett** (1)	22,704	49–16	7–1	2–0	Stats; Story
June 24	7:00 pm	ESPN	#5 Coastal Carolina	#3	TD Ameritrade Park • Omaha, NE	**L** 1–4	Beckwith (14–1)	**Traver** (1–3)	–	24,904	49–17	7–2	2–1	Stats; Story
June 25	7:00 pm	ESPN	#5 Coastal Carolina	#3	TD Ameritrade Park • Omaha, NE	**L** 5–7	**Janczak**	Cunningham	–		49–18	7–3	2–2	

Legend: = Win = Loss Bold = TCU team member
All rankings from Collegiate Baseball as-of the date of the contest.

== Rankings ==
TCU began the season ranked #11 in the USA Today Coaches' Poll, #12 in the National Collegiate Baseball Writers Association poll, #15 in the Collegiate Baseball poll, #18 in the Baseball America ranking, #18 in the Perfect Game ranking, and #19 in the D1Baseball ranking. TCU ended the season ranked #3 in all six polls.

Ranking movements Legend: ██ Increase in ranking ██ Decrease in ranking
	Week																		
Poll	Pre	1	2	3	4	5	6	7	8	9	10	11	12	13	14	15	16	17	Final
Coaches'	11	11*	11*	9	7	6	9	6	9	6	10	12	10	11	11	9	9*	9*	3
Baseball America	18	17	9	8	8	5	8	7	7	4	7	12	10	15	14	10	10*	10*	3
Collegiate Baseball^	15	15	9	11	11	9	15	10	11	8	11	12	13	16	14	13	10	3	3
NCBWA†	12	13	7	7	7	5	8	6	9	6	9	10	8	13	12	9	7	7*	3

^ Collegiate Baseball ranked 40 teams in their preseason poll, but only ranked 30 teams weekly during the season.
† NCBWA ranks 30 teams in their preseason poll, but only ranks 25 teams weekly during the season.
* A new poll was not released for this week, so for comparison purposes, the previous week's ranking is inserted in this week's slot.

== Awards and honors ==
=== Preseason awards ===
Mitchell Traver

- NCBWA Preseason First Team All-American
- Louisville Slugger Preseason Second Team All-American
- Perfect Game Preseason Second Team All-American

=== Weekly awards ===
Luken Baker

- Big 12 Newcomer of the Week (February 22)
- Houston College Classic All-Tournament Team (February 28)
- Big 12 Newcomer of the Week (March 7)

Dalton Horton

- Big 12 Pitcher of the Week (April 11)

Brian Howard

- Houston College Classic All-Tournament Team (February 28)

Evan Skoug

- Big 12 Player of the Week (April 18)

Dane Steinhagen

- Houston College Classic All-Tournament Team (February 28)

== See also ==
- 2016 TCU Baseball Fact Book
- 2016 Big 12 Baseball Media Guide
- 2016 Big 12 Conference baseball tournament
- 2016 NCAA Division I baseball tournament
- 2016 NCAA Division I baseball season
