= 2016 Baylor Bears baseball team =

University baseball team in Texas, US

2016 Baylor Bears baseball
- Conference: Big 12 Conference
- Record: 16–16 (4–5 Big 12)
- Head coach: Steve Rodriguez (1st season)
- Assistant coaches: Jon Strauss (1st season); Mike Taylor (1st season); Ruben Noriega (1st season)
- Home stadium: Baylor Ballpark

2016 Big 12 Conference baseball standings
	Conf.						Overall
Team	W		L		T	PCT	W		L		T	PCT
No. 5 Texas Tech ‍†‍‍^{y}	19	–	5	–	0	.792	47	–	20	–	0	.701
No. 4 Oklahoma State ‍‍‍^{y}	16	–	8	–	0	.667	43	–	22	–	0	.662
No. 3 TCU ‍‍‡‍^{y}	15	–	9	–	0	.625	49	–	18	–	0	.731
West Virginia ‍‍‍	12	–	11	–	0	.522	36	–	22	–	0	.621
Oklahoma ‍‍‍	11	–	13	–	0	.458	30	–	27	–	1	.526
Baylor ‍‍‍	10	–	14	–	0	.417	24	–	29	–	0	.453
Texas ‍‍‍	10	–	14	–	0	.417	25	–	32	–	0	.439
Kansas State ‍‍‍	8	–	16	–	0	.333	26	–	31	–	0	.456
Kansas ‍‍‍	6	–	17	–	0	.261	20	–	35	–	1	.366
† – Conference champion ‡ – Tournament champion y – Invited to the NCAA tournament Rankings from Collegiate Baseball

The 2016 Baylor Bears baseball team represented Baylor University during the 2016 NCAA Division I baseball season. The Bears played their home games at Baylor Ballpark in Waco, Texas as a member of the Big 12 Conference. They were led by head coach Steve Rodriguez, in his 1st season at Baylor.

== Previous season ==
In 2015, the Bears finished the season 8th in the Big 12 with a record of 23–32 (9–15 Big 12). Baylor qualified for the 2015 Big 12 Conference baseball tournament and was eliminated in the tournament semifinal. They failed to qualify for the 2015 NCAA Division I baseball tournament. At the conclusion of the 2015 season, Baylor fired 21-year head coach Steve Smith, the winningest coach in Baylor athletic history. On June 12, 2015, Baylor announced Pepperdine Waves head coach Steve Rodriguez as the Bears' new head coach for 2016; Rodriguez, a Pepperdine alum, played on the Waves' 1992 national championship team, then led the Waves to the NCAA tournament in 8 of his 12 years as head coach.

== Personnel ==
=== Roster ===
2016 Baylor Bears roster
Pitchers: 3 – Nick Lewis (RHP) – Junior; 10 – Austin Stone (RHP) – (redshirt) Senior; 15 – Kyle Hill (RHP) – Freshman; 16 – Joe Heineman (RHP) – Sophomore; 22 – Daniel Castano (LHP) – Junior; 24 – Andrew McInvale (RHP) – Freshman; 26 – Kody Hessemer (RHP) – Senior; 27 – Drew Tolson (RHP) – Junior; 28 – Blake Allen (RHP) – (redshirt) Freshman; 31 – Tyler Shumpert (RHP) – Sophomore; 33 – Theron Kay (RHP) – Sophomore; 35 – Kyle Ott (RHP) – (redshirt) Sophomore; 36 – Troy Montemayor (RHP) – Sophomore; 43 – Alex Phillips (RHP) – Junior; 47 – Drew Robertson (RHP) – Junior; 50 – Collin Garrett (RHP) – Freshman	Catchers: 12 – Matt Menard – Junior; 13 – Joe Sabatini – Junior; 19 – Aaron Dodson – Junior; 32 – Cameron Miller – Sophomore; Infielders: 1 – Justin Arrington – Senior; 2 – Steven McLean – Sophomore; 9 – West Tunnell – Senior; 14 – Josh Bissonette – Freshman; 19 – Aaron Dodson – Junior; 20 – T.J. Raguse – Freshman; 25 – Ben Carl – Junior; 32 – Cameron Miller – Junior; 37 – Jonathan Ducoff – Sophomore	Outfielders: 8 – Levi Gilcrease – Sophomore; 11 – Darryn Sheppard – Junior; 13 – Joe Sabatini – Junior; 18 – Kameron Esthay – Sophomore; 20 – T.J. Raguse – Freshman; 21 – Richard Cunningham – (redshirt) Sophomore

=== Coaching staff ===
Name	Position	Seasons at Baylor	Alma mater
Steve Rodriguez	Head coach	1	Pepperdine University (2001)
Jon Strauss	Assistant coach	1	Long Beach State University (1996)
Mike Taylor	Assistant coach	1	Prairie View A&M University (1997)
Ruben Noriega	Assistant coach	1	Lindenwood University (1999)

== Schedule and results ==
2016 Baylor Bears baseball game log
Regular season
February

Date	Time (CT)	TV	Opponent	Rank	Site/stadium	Score	Win	Loss	Save	Attendance	Overall	Big 12
February 19	6:35 pm	FSSW+	Washington*		Baylor Ballpark • Waco, TX	**L** 2–7	Bremer (0–1)	**Castano** (0–1)	–	2,836	0–1	–
February 20	3:05 pm		Washington*		Baylor Ballpark • Waco, TX	**W** 9–5	**Heineman** (1–0)	Nesbitt (0–1)	–	2,464	1–1	–
February 21	1:05 pm	FSSW+	Washington*		Baylor Ballpark • Waco, TX	**L** 1–7	Nesbitt (1–1)	**Lewis** (0–1)	Rallings (1)	2,155	1–2	–
February 24	6:35 pm		Texas–Arlington*		Baylor Ballpark • Waco, TX	**L** 2–9	Simmons (1–1)	**McInvale** (0–1)	–	1,919	1–3	–
February 26	6:35 pm		Stony Brook*		Baylor Ballpark • Waco, TX	**W** 16–2	**Castano** (1–1)	Honahan (1–1)	–	2,240	2–3	–
February 27	3:05 pm		Stony Brook*		Baylor Ballpark • Waco, TX	**W** 20–4	**Tolson** (1–0)	Stone (0–1)	–	2,383	3–3	–
February 28	1:05 pm	FSSW	Stony Brook*		Baylor Ballpark • Waco, TX	**W** 6–5	**McInvale** (1–1)	Lee (0–2)	**Montemayor** (1)	1,291	4–3	–

March

Date	Time (CT)	TV	Opponent	Rank	Site/stadium	Score	Win	Loss	Save	Attendance	Overall	Big 12
March 1	6:30 pm		at Sam Houston State*		Don Sanders Stadium • Huntsville, TX	**W** 5–3	**Ott** (1–0)	Belton (0–1)	**Allen** (1)	1,236	5–3	–
March 4	6:30 pm		at Houston*		Cougar Field • Houston, TX	**W** 4–2	**Castano** (2–1)	Lantrip (1–2)	**Montemayor** (2)	1,109	6–3	–
March 5	6:30 pm		at Houston*		Cougar Field • Houston, TX	**L** 4–10	King (2–1)	**Tolson** (1–1)	Hernandez (1)	1,233	6–4	–
March 6	1:00 pm		at Houston*		Cougar Field • Houston, TX	**L** 2–11	Romero (1–0)	**Lewis** (0–2)	Maxwell (1)	1,255	6–5	–
March 8	6:35 pm		Texas State*		Baylor Ballpark • Waco, TX	**L** 3–12	Lewis (1–1)	**Ott** (1–1)	–	1,935	6–6	–
March 11	6:35 pm		New Mexico State*		Baylor Ballpark • Waco, TX	**L** 5–9	Erwin (2–0)	**Heineman** (1–1)	–	2,001	6–7	–
March 12	5:35 pm		San Diego*		Baylor Ballpark • Waco, TX	**L** 3–5	Kuchta (1–0)	**Ott** (1–2)	–	2,319	6–8	–
March 13	12:05 pm		San Diego*		Baylor Ballpark • Waco, TX	**W** 6–3	**Hessemer** (1–0)	Judish (0–1)	**Montemayor** (3)	1,990	7–8	–
March 13	4:05 pm		New Mexico State*		Baylor Ballpark • Waco, TX	**L** 4–7	Bradish (1–2)	**Hill** (0–1)	Erwin (1)	2,427	7–9	–
March 18	4:05 pm	FSSW	Texas Tech		Baylor Ballpark • Waco, TX	**L** 0–5	Martin (2–0)	**Castano** (2–2)	–	2,328	7–10	0–1
March 19	3:05 pm	FCS	Texas Tech		Baylor Ballpark • Waco, TX	**W** 4–3	**Ott** (2–2)	Moseley (2–2)	**Montemayor** (4)	3,523	8–10	1–1
March 20	1:05 pm	FSSW+	Texas Tech		Baylor Ballpark • Waco, TX	**L** 5–6	Howard (4–1)	**Lewis** (0–3)	Dugger (3)	2,377	8–11	1–2
March 22	6:30 pm		at Texas–Arlington*		Clay Gould Ballpark • Arlington, TX	**L** 3–6	Schneider (1–1)	**Stone** (0–1)	–	671	8–12	–
March 24	6:35 pm		Dallas Baptist*		Baylor Ballpark • Waco, TX	**W** 8–3	**Heineman** (2–1)	Hall (3–2)	–	2,254	9–12	–
March 25	6:30 pm		at Dallas Baptist*		Horner Ballpark • Dallas, TX	**L** 3–5	Poche (3–0)	**Castano** (2–3)	Elledge (6)	1,412	9–13	–
March 26	2:00 pm		at Dallas Baptist*		Horner Ballpark • Dallas, TX	**W** 19–6	**Tolson** (2–1)	Stutzman (2–1)	–	1,389	10–13	–
March 29	6:05 pm		UTSA*		Baylor Ballpark • Waco, TX	**W** 5–4	**Montemayor** (1–0)	Herbelin (1–2)	–	2,051	11–13	–

April

Date	Time (CT)	TV	Opponent	Rank	Site/stadium	Score	Win	Loss	Save	Attendance	Overall	Big 12
April 1	6:35 pm	FSSW+	Kansas		Baylor Ballpark • Waco, TX	**L** 1–6	Krauth (2–4)	**Castano** (2–4)	–	2,080	11–14	1–3
April 2	3:05 pm	FSSW+	Kansas		Baylor Ballpark • Waco, TX	**W** 2–1	**Tolson** (3–1)	Weiman (1–2)	**Montemayor** (5)	3,066	12–14	2–3
April 3	1:05 pm	FSSW+	Kansas		Baylor Ballpark • Waco, TX	**W** 5–2	**Hill** (1–1)	Goddard (2–2)	**Montemayor** (6)	2,128	13–14	3–3
April 5	6:35 pm		Wofford*		Baylor Ballpark • Waco, TX	**W** 9–5	**Lewis** (1–3)	Higginbotham (0–3)	–	1,973	14–14	–
April 6	4:05 pm		Wofford*		Baylor Ballpark • Waco, TX	**W** 4–0	**McInvale** (2–1)	Pile (0–1)	–	1,926	15–14	–
April 8	6:00 pm		at Oklahoma		L. Dale Mitchell Baseball Park • Norman, OK	**L** 3–4	Neuse (2–1)	**Heineman** (2–2)	–	1,370	15–15	3–4
April 9	5:00 pm		at Oklahoma		L. Dale Mitchell Baseball Park • Norman, OK	**W** 6–1	**Tolson** (4–1)	Madden (1–2)	**Montemayor** (7)	1,633	16–15	4–4
April 10	1:00 pm		at Oklahoma		L. Dale Mitchell Baseball Park • Norman, OK	**L** 6–7^{11}	Neuse (3–1)	**McInvale** (2–2)	–	938	16–16	4–5
April 13	4:05 pm		Lamar*		Baylor Ballpark • Waco, TX							
April 15	6:35 pm	FSSW+	Oklahoma State		Baylor Ballpark • Waco, TX							
April 16	3:05 pm	FSSW	Oklahoma State		Baylor Ballpark • Waco, TX							
April 17	1:05 pm	FSSW+	Oklahoma State		Baylor Ballpark • Waco, TX							
April 19	6:35 pm		Sam Houston State*		Baylor Ballpark • Waco, TX							
April 22	6:30 pm		at Kansas State		Tointon Family Stadium • Manhattan, KS							
April 23	2:00 pm		at Kansas State		Tointon Family Stadium • Manhattan, KS							
April 24	1:00 pm		at Kansas State		Tointon Family Stadium • Manhattan, KS							
April 26	6:35 pm		Incarnate Word*		Baylor Ballpark • Waco, TX							
April 29	5:30 pm		at West Virginia		Monongalia County Ballpark • Granville, WV							
April 30	3:00 pm		at West Virginia		Monongalia County Ballpark • Granville, WV							

May

Date	Time (CT)	TV	Opponent	Rank	Site/stadium	Score	Win	Loss	Save	Attendance	Overall	Big 12
May 1	12:00 pm		at West Virginia		Monongalia County Ballpark • Granville, WV							
May 10	6:35 pm		McNeese State*		Baylor Ballpark • Waco, TX							
May 11	4:05 pm		McNeese State*		Baylor Ballpark • Waco, TX							
May 13	6:35 pm	FSSW+	TCU		Baylor Ballpark • Waco, TX							
May 14	3:05 pm	FSSW	TCU		Baylor Ballpark • Waco, TX							
May 15	1:05 pm	FSSW+	TCU		Baylor Ballpark • Waco, TX							
May 17	6:00 pm		at UTSA*		Nelson W. Wolff Municipal Stadium • San Antonio, TX							
May 19	6:00 pm	LHN	at Texas		UFCU Disch–Falk Field • Austin, TX							
May 20	6:00 pm	LHN	at Texas		UFCU Disch–Falk Field • Austin, TX							
May 21	2:00 pm	LHN	at Texas		UFCU Disch–Falk Field • Austin, TX							

Postseason
Big 12 Tournament

Date	Time (CT)	TV	Opponent	Rank	Site/stadium	Score	Win	Loss	Save	Attendance	Overall	Big 12 Tourn.
May 25	TBD		TBD		Chickasaw Bricktown Ballpark • Oklahoma City, OK							
May 26	TBD		TBD		Chickasaw Bricktown Ballpark • Oklahoma City, OK							

Legend: = Win = Loss Bold = Baylor team member
All rankings from Collegiate Baseball.
