= 2016 Kansas State Wildcats baseball team =

American college baseball season

2016 Kansas State Wildcats baseball
- Conference: Big 12 Conference
- Record: 14–19 (1–8 Big 12)
- Head coach: Brad Hill (13th season)
- Assistant coaches: Andy Sawyers (2nd season); Tyler Kincaid (1st season); Blake Kangas (4th season)
- Home stadium: Tointon Family Stadium

2016 Big 12 Conference baseball standings
	Conf.						Overall
Team	W		L		T	PCT	W		L		T	PCT
No. 5 Texas Tech ‍†‍‍^{y}	19	–	5	–	0	.792	47	–	20	–	0	.701
No. 4 Oklahoma State ‍‍‍^{y}	16	–	8	–	0	.667	43	–	22	–	0	.662
No. 3 TCU ‍‍‡‍^{y}	15	–	9	–	0	.625	49	–	18	–	0	.731
West Virginia ‍‍‍	12	–	11	–	0	.522	36	–	22	–	0	.621
Oklahoma ‍‍‍	11	–	13	–	0	.458	30	–	27	–	1	.526
Baylor ‍‍‍	10	–	14	–	0	.417	24	–	29	–	0	.453
Texas ‍‍‍	10	–	14	–	0	.417	25	–	32	–	0	.439
Kansas State ‍‍‍	8	–	16	–	0	.333	26	–	31	–	0	.456
Kansas ‍‍‍	6	–	17	–	0	.261	20	–	35	–	1	.366
† – Conference champion ‡ – Tournament champion y – Invited to the NCAA tournament Rankings from Collegiate Baseball

The 2016 Kansas State Wildcats baseball team represented Kansas State University during the 2016 NCAA Division I baseball season. The Wildcats played their home games at Tointon Family Stadium as a member of the Big 12 Conference. They were led by head coach Brad Hill, in his 13th season at Kansas State.

== Previous season ==
The 2015 Kansas State Wildcats baseball team notched a 27–30 (10–14) record and finished sixth in the Big 12 Conference standings. The Wildcats reached the 2015 Big 12 Conference baseball tournament championship game, where they were eliminated in the second round. Kansas State did not receive an at-large bid to the 2015 NCAA Division I baseball tournament.

== Personnel ==
=== Roster ===
2016 Kansas State Wildcats Roster
Pitchers: 10 – Nick Jones (RHP) – Junior; 14 – Colton Kalmus (RHP) – (redshirt) Junior; 16 – Parker Rigler (LHP) – Junior; 20 – Lucas Benenati (RHP) – (redshirt) Senior; 21 – Bryce Ward (RHP) – Sophomore; 22 – Garrett Spencer (LHP) – Freshman; 28 – Cory Wright (LHP) – Freshman; 29 – Levi MaVorhis (RHP) – Senior; 30 – Jordan Floyd (LHP) – Junior; 32 – Brogan Heinen (RHP) – Freshman; 34 – Jacob Ruder (RHP) – Freshman; 35 – Logan Riley (RHP) – Freshman; 37 – Corey Fischer (RHP) – Senior; 38 – Brandon Erickson (RHP) – Senior; 40 – Davis Schwab (LHP) – Freshman; 44 – Mitch Zubradt (RHP) – Freshman; 45 – John Boushelle (RHP) – Freshman	Catchers: 17 – Tyler Moore – Senior; 24 – Josh Rolette – Freshman; 39 – Matt Nerz – (redshirt) Freshman; Infielders: 1 – Jake Wodtke – (redshirt) Junior; 6 – Josh Ethier – Junior; 7 – Tyler Wolfe – Senior; 8 – Steve Serratore – (redshirt) Junior; 23- Jake Scudder – Junior	Outfielders: 2 – Sam Chadick – Sophomore; 5 – Clayton Dalrymple – Senior; 9 – Danny Krause – Senior; 12 – Cade Bunnell – Freshman; 19 – Michael Smith – Freshman; 25 – Quintin Crandall – (redshirt) Junior; 26 – Brooks Zimmerman – Freshman

=== Coaching staff ===
Name	Position	Seasons at Kansas State	Alma mater
Brad Hill	Head coach	13	Emporia State University (1985)
Andy Sawyers	Associate head coach/offensive coordinator	2	University of Nebraska–Lincoln (1998)
Tyler Kincaid	Assistant coach/Pitching	1	San Francisco State University
Blake Kangas	Volunteer Assistant Coach	4	University of Wisconsin–Milwaukee (2007)

== Schedule and results ==
2016 Kansas State Wildcats baseball game log
Regular season
February

Date	Time (CT)	TV	Opponent	Rank	Site/stadium	Score	Win	Loss	Save	Attendance	Overall	Big 12
February 19	8:0 pm		at UC Riverside*		Riverside Sports Complex • Riverside, CA	**W** 1–0	**Fischer** (1–0)	Sodders (0–1)	**Kalmus** (1)	423	1–0	–
February 20	3:00 pm		at UC Riverside*		Riverside Sports Complex • Riverside, CA	**L** 3–6	Landazuri (1–0)	**Rigler** (0–1)	Morton (1)	275	1–1	–
February 21	3:00 pm		at UC Riverside*		Riverside Sports Complex • Riverside, CA	**W** 8–1	**MaVorhis** (1–0)	Delgado (0–1)	–	284	2–1	–
February 22	8:00 pm		at UC Riverside*		Riverside Sports Complex • Riverside, CA	**L** 3–6	Musgraves (1–0)	**Kalmus** (0–1)	–	227	2–2	–
February 25	2:00 pm		#8 Oregon State*		Surprise Stadium • Surprise, AZ (Big 12/Pac-12 Challenge)	**L** 5–7	Fehmel (2–0)	**Floyd** (0–1)	Engelbrekt (3)	2,309	2–3	–
February 26	2:00 pm		#8 Oregon State*		Surprise Stadium • Surprise, AZ (Big 12/Pac-12 Challenge)	**L** 0–14	Thompson (1–1)	**Rigler** (0–2)	–	2,643	2–4	–
February 27	6:00 pm		Utah*		Surprise Stadium • Surprise, AZ (Big 12/Pac-12 Challenge)	**W** 9–2	**McVorhis** (2–0)	Carroll (1–1)	–	3,133	3–4	–
February 28	2:30 pm		Utah*		Surprise Stadium • Surprise, AZ (Big 12/Pac-12 Challenge)	**W** 20–4	**Kalmus** (1–1)	Ottesen (0–2)	–	1,736	4–4	–

March

Date	Time (CT)	TV	Opponent	Rank	Site/stadium	Score	Win	Loss	Save	Attendance	Overall	Big 12
March 4	3:00 pm		Arkansas–Pine Bluff*		Tointon Family Stadium • Manhattan, KS	**W** 18–8	**Floyd** (1–1)	Holdridge (0–2)	–	2,233	5–4	–
March 5	2:00 pm		Arkansas–Pine Bluff*		Tointon Family Stadium • Manhattan, KS	**W** 15–9	**Rigler** (1–2)	Medina (0–2)	–	2,066	6–4	–
March 6	1:00 pm		Arkansas–Pine Bluff*		Tointon Family Stadium • Manhattan, KS	**W** 13–8	**Kalmus** (2–1)	Lewington (0–2)	–	2,078	7–4	–
March 9	3:00 pm	COX KS	Creighton*		Tointon Family Stadium • Manhattan, KS	**W** 8–2	**Heinen** (1–0)	Elman (0–1)	–	1,920	8–4	–
March 11	3:00 pm		Milwaukee*		Tointon Family Stadium • Manhattan, KS	**L** 1–14	Keller (1–3)	**Fischer** (1–1)	–	2,005	8–5	–
March 12	2:00 pm		Milwaukee*		Tointon Family Stadium • Manhattan, KS	**W** 3–1	**Rigler** (2–2)	Peters (1–2)	**Benenati** (1)	2,095	9–5	–
March 13	1:00 pm	FCS	Milwaukee*		Tointon Family Stadium • Manhattan, KS	**W** 7–0	**MaVorhis** (3–0)	Reuss (1–2)	–	2,014	10–5	–
March 15	6:30 pm	FCS	Stephen F. Austin*		Tointon Family Stadium • Manhattan, KS	**L** 5–6	Polivka (1–1)	**Ruder** (0–1)	Starks (1)	2,042	10–6	–
March 16	3:00 pm		Stephen F. Austin*		Tointon Family Stadium • Manhattan, KS	**W** 11–5	**Wiley** (1–0)	Adams (1–1)	–	1,991	11–6	–
March 18	6:30 pm		Western Carolina*		Tointon Family Stadium • Manhattan, KS	**L** 5–7	Davis (2–0)	**Floyd** (1–2)	–	1,912	11–7	–
March 19	2:00 pm		Western Carolina*		Tointon Family Stadium • Manhattan, KS	**L** 2–6	Sammons (3–1)	**Rigler** (2–3)	Nobles (2)	1,794	11–8	–
March 20	1:00 pm		Western Carolina*		Tointon Family Stadium • Manhattan, KS	**L** 2–10	Baker (1–2)	**Ruder** (0–2)	–	1,890	11–9	–
March 22	6:30 pm	COX KS	at Creighton*		TD Ameritrade Park • Omaha, NE	**L** 4–5	Decaster (1–0)	**Wiley** (1–1)	Gerber (5)	2,324	11–10	–
March 24	6:00 pm	FS1	Oklahoma State		Tointon Family Stadium • Manhattan, KS	**L** 1–2	Hatch (2–0)	**MaVorhis** (3–1)	Buffett (2)	1,884	11–11	0–1
March 25	6:30 pm	FCS	Oklahoma State		Tointon Family Stadium • Manhattan, KS	**L** 4–5	Williams (1–0)	**Rigler** (2–4)	Buffett (3)	2,337	11–12	0–2
March 26	2:00 pm		Oklahoma State		Tointon Family Stadium • Manhattan, KS	**L** 4–5^{10}	Buffett (4–1)	**Benenati** (0–1)	–	2,006	11–13	0–3
March 29	6:30 pm	FCS	Omaha*		Tointon Family Stadium • Manhattan, KS	**W** 11–3	**Wiley** (2–1)	Sasse (1–3)	–	1,916	12–13	–
March 30	4:00 pm		Oral Roberts*		Tointon Family Stadium • Manhattan, KS	**L** 10–14^{11}	Womack (2–1)	**Fischer** (1–2)	–	1,865	12–14	–

April

Date	Time (CT)	TV	Opponent	Rank	Site/stadium	Score	Win	Loss	Save	Attendance	Overall	Big 12
April 2	1:00 pm		at #29 Texas Tech		Dan Law Field at Rip Griffin Park • Lubbock, TX	**L** 3–10	Martin (4–0)	**MaVorhis** (3–2)	Shetter (1)	4,145	12–15	0–4
April 2	4:15 pm		at #29 Texas Tech		Dan Law Field at Rip Griffin Park • Lubbock, TX	**L** 4–10	Gingery (3–1)	**Rigler** (2–5)	Howard (2)	4,145	12–16	0–5
April 3	12:00 pm		at #29 Texas Tech		Dan Law Field at Rip Griffin Park • Lubbock, TX	**L** 5–6	Dugger (1–0)	**Fischer** (1–3)	Moseley (2)	3,655	12–17	0–6
April 5	6:30 pm		at Nebraska*		Haymarket Park • Lincoln, NE	**W** 4–2	**Erickson** (1–0)	Meyers (1–1)	**Floyd** (1)	2,926	13–17	–
April 8	6:30 pm	COX KS	Texas		Tointon Family Stadium • Manhattan, KS	**L** 3–6	Cooper (2–1)	**Rigler** (2–6)	Shugart (2)	2,331	13–18	0–7
April 9	2:00 pm		Texas		Tointon Family Stadium • Manhattan, KS	**L** 5–12	Culbreth (6–2)	**MaVorhis** (3–3)	–	2,331	13–19	0–8
April 10	1:00 pm		Texas		Tointon Family Stadium • Manhattan, KS	**W** 3–2	**Benenati** (1–1)	Shugart (1–1)	–	2,331	14–19	1–8
April 15	5:30 pm		at West Virginia		Monongalia County Ballpark • Granville, WV	**W** 8–6					15–19	2–8
April 16	3:00 pm		at West Virginia		Monongalia County Ballpark • Granville, WV							
April 17	12:00 pm		at West Virginia		Monongalia County Ballpark • Granville, WV							
April 19	6:30 pm	FCS	Nebraska*		Tointon Family Stadium • Manhattan, KS							
April 20	6:30 pm	COX KS	at Omaha*		Werner Park • Papillion, NE							
April 22	6:30 pm	FCS	Baylor		Tointon Family Stadium • Manhattan, KS							
April 23	4:00 pm		Baylor		Tointon Family Stadium • Manhattan, KS							
April 24	1:00 pm		Baylor		Tointon Family Stadium • Manhattan, KS							
April 26	6:30 pm	COX KS	at Wichita State*		Eck Stadium • Wichita, KS							
April 27	6:30 pm	FCS	Grand Canyon*		Tointon Family Stadium • Manhattan, KS							
April 29	6:00 pm		at Iowa*		Duane Banks Field • Iowa City, IA							
April 30	2:00 pm		at Iowa*		Duane Banks Field • Iowa City, IA							

May

Date	Time (CT)	TV	Opponent	Rank	Site/stadium	Score	Win	Loss	Save	Attendance	Overall	Big 12
May 1	1:00 pm		at Iowa*		Duane Banks Field • Iowa City, IA							
May 3	6:30 pm	FCS	Wichita State*		Tointon Family Stadium • Manhattan, KS							
May 6	6:00 pm	FSOK	at Oklahoma		L. Dale Mitchell Baseball Park • Norman, OK							
May 7	2:00 pm	FSOK	at Oklahoma		L. Dale Mitchell Baseball Park • Norman, OK							
May 8	1:00 pm	FSOK	at Oklahoma		L. Dale Mitchell Baseball Park • Norman, OK							
May 13	6:30 pm	COX KS	Kansas		Tointon Family Stadium • Manhattan, KS							
May 14	3:30 pm	COX KS	Kansas		Tointon Family Stadium • Manhattan, KS							
May 15	1:00 pm	COX KS	Kansas		Tointon Family Stadium • Manhattan, KS							
May 19	6:30 pm		at TCU		Lupton Stadium • Fort Worth, TX							
May 20	6:30 pm	FSSW+	at TCU		Lupton Stadium • Fort Worth, TX							
May 21	4:00 pm	FSSW	at TCU		Lupton Stadium • Fort Worth, TX							

Postseason
Big 12 Tournament

Date	Time (CT)	TV	Opponent	Rank	Site/stadium	Score	Win	Loss	Save	Attendance	Overall	Big 12 Tourn.
May 25	TBD		TBD		Chickasaw Bricktown Ballpark • Oklahoma City, OK							
May 26	TBD		TBD		Chickasaw Bricktown Ballpark • Oklahoma City, OK							

Legend: = Win = Loss Bold = Kansas State team member
All rankings from Collegiate Baseball.
