= 2016 Texas Longhorns baseball team =

American college baseball season

2016 Texas Longhorns baseball
- Conference: Big 12 Conference
- Record: 25–32 (10–14 Big 12)
- Head coach: Augie Garrido (20th season)
- Assistant coaches: Skip Johnson (10th season); Tommy Nicholson (4th season); Ryan Russ (4th season)
- Home stadium: UFCU Disch–Falk Field

2016 Big 12 Conference baseball standings
	Conf.						Overall
Team	W		L		T	PCT	W		L		T	PCT
No. 5 Texas Tech ‍†‍‍^{y}	19	–	5	–	0	.792	47	–	20	–	0	.701
No. 4 Oklahoma State ‍‍‍^{y}	16	–	8	–	0	.667	43	–	22	–	0	.662
No. 3 TCU ‍‍‡‍^{y}	15	–	9	–	0	.625	49	–	18	–	0	.731
West Virginia ‍‍‍	12	–	11	–	0	.522	36	–	22	–	0	.621
Oklahoma ‍‍‍	11	–	13	–	0	.458	30	–	27	–	1	.526
Baylor ‍‍‍	10	–	14	–	0	.417	24	–	29	–	0	.453
Texas ‍‍‍	10	–	14	–	0	.417	25	–	32	–	0	.439
Kansas State ‍‍‍	8	–	16	–	0	.333	26	–	31	–	0	.456
Kansas ‍‍‍	6	–	17	–	0	.261	20	–	35	–	1	.366
† – Conference champion ‡ – Tournament champion y – Invited to the NCAA tournament Rankings from Collegiate Baseball

The 2016 Texas Longhorns baseball team represented the University of Texas at Austin during the 2016 NCAA Division I baseball season. The Longhorns played their home games at UFCU Disch–Falk Field as a member of the Big 12 Conference. They were led by head coach Augie Garrido, in his 20th and final season at Texas.

== Previous season ==
The 2015 Texas Longhorns baseball team notched a 30–27 (11–13) record and finished fifth in the Big 12 Conference standings. The Longhorns won the 2015 Big 12 Conference baseball tournament, earning the Big 12's automatic bid to the 2015 NCAA Division I baseball tournament. The Longhorns were selected for the Dallas Regional, where they lost their first game to Oregon State and were eliminated from the Tournament with a loss in their second game to Regional host Dallas Baptist.

== Personnel ==
=== Roster ===
2016 Texas Longhorns roster
Pitchers: 13 - Tyler Schimpf (RHP) - Sophomore; 14 - Beau Ridgeway (RHP) - Freshman; 15 - Eric Dunbar (RHP) - (redshirt) Sophomore; 19 - Connor Mayes (RHP) - Sophomore; 24 - Chase Shugart (RHP) - Freshman; 27 - Travis Duke (LHP) - Senior; 29 - Jon Malmin (LHP) - Junior; 30 - Josh Sawyer (LHP) - Junior; 32 - Nicholas Kennedy (LHP) - Freshman; 34 - Kyle Johnston (RHP) - Sophomore; 35 - Blake Wellmann (RHP) - Freshman; 38 - Ty Culbreth (LHP) - Senior; 40 - James Nittoli (LHP) - Freshman; 41 - Morgan Cooper (RHP) - (redshirt) Sophomore; 42 - Kacy Clemens (RHP) - Junior; 43 - Chance Callihan (RHP) - (redshirt) Freshman; 45 - Nolan Kingham (RHP) - Freshman; 49 - Parker Joe Robinson (RHP) - (redshirt) Freshman; 51 - Jake McKenzie (RHP) - Sophomore	Catchers: 1 - Tres Barrera - Junior; 7 - Michael Cantu - Sophomore; 37 - Matthew White - Freshman; 46 - James Barton - Senior; Infielders: 2 - Kody Clemens - Freshman; 5 - Matthew Schmidt - Freshman; 11 - Travis Jones - Sophomore; 12 - Joe Baker - Sophomore; 17 - Bret Boswell - (redshirt) Sophomore; 24 - Chase Shugart - Freshman; 39 - Tate Shaw - (redshirt) Freshman; 42 - Kacy Clemens - Junior; 51 - Jake McKenzie - Sophomore	Outfielders: 4 - Kaleb Denny - (redshirt) Freshman; 6 - Tyler Rand - Freshman; 8 - Brady Harlan - Freshman; 11 - Travis Jones - Sophomore; 33 - Patrick Mathis - Sophomore; 47 - Ben Kennedy - (redshirt) Sophomore; 50 - Zane Gurwitz - Junior

=== Coaching staff ===
Name	Position	Seasons at Texas	Alma mater
Augie Garrido	Head coach	20	Fresno State University (1961)
Skip Johnson	Associate Head Coach	10	University of Texas–Pan American (1990)
Tommy Nicholson	Assistant coach	4	University of Texas at Austin (2006)
Ryan Russ	Volunteer Assistant Coach	4	University of Texas at Austin (2004)

== Schedule and results ==
2016 Texas Longhorns baseball game log
Regular Season
February

Date	Time (CT)	TV	Opponent	Rank	Site/stadium	Score	Win	Loss	Save	Attendance	Overall	Big 12
February 19	6:00 pm	LHN	UNLV*	#40	UFCU Disch–Falk Field • Austin, TX	**L** 3–4^{12}	Bohall (1–0)	**Robinson** (0–1)	–	5,305	0–1	–
February 20	2:00 pm	LHN	UNLV*	#40	UFCU Disch–Falk Field • Austin, TX	**W** 11–2	**Culbreth** (1–0)	Oakley (0–1)	–	5,526	1–1	–
February 21	1:00 pm	LHN	UNLV*	#40	UFCU Disch–Falk Field • Austin, TX	**W** 7–0	**Duke** (1–0)	Wright (0–1)	–	4,891	2–1	–
February 25	6:00 pm	LHN	#21 Stanford*		UFCU Disch–Falk Field • Austin, TX	**L** 0–1^{12}	Viall (1–0)	**Malmin** (0–1)	–	4,676	2–2	–
February 26	6:30 pm	LHN	#21 Stanford*		UFCU Disch–Falk Field • Austin, TX	**W** 4–3	**Johnston** (1–0)	Beck (1–1)	**Shugart** (1)	5,550	3–2	–
February 27	3:30 pm	LHN	#21 Stanford*		UFCU Disch–Falk Field • Austin, TX	**W** 9–0	**Culbreth** (2–0)	Castellanos (1–1)	–	6,623	4–2	–
February 28	12:30 pm	LHN	#21 Stanford*		UFCU Disch–Falk Field • Austin, TX	**L** 1–11	Hanewich (2–0)	**Moyes** (0–1)	–	5,625	4–3	–

March

Date	Time (CT)	TV	Opponent	Rank	Site/stadium	Score	Win	Loss	Save	Attendance	Overall	Big 12
March 1	6:00 pm		at Texas State*		Bobcat Ballpark • San Marcos, TX	**W** 10–4^{11}	**Shugart** (1–0)	Mazzoccoli (0–1)	–	2,776	5–3	–
March 3	6:00 pm	LHN	#30 California*		UFCU Disch–Falk Field • Austin, TX	**L** 1–4	Bain (1–1)	**Kingham** (0–1)	Martinez (3)	4,480	5–4	–
March 4	6:00 pm	LHN	#30 California*		UFCU Disch–Falk Field • Austin, TX	**L** 3–4	Jefferies (3–0)	**Johnston** (1–1)	Martinez (4)	5,280	5–5	–
March 5	2:00 pm	LHN	#30 California*		UFCU Disch–Falk Field • Austin, TX	**L** 0–6	Mason (2–0)	**Culbreth** (2–1)	Dodson (1)	5,467	5–6	–
March 6	12:00 pm	LHN	#30 California*		UFCU Disch–Falk Field • Austin, TX	**L** 7–10	Martinez (1–0)	**Malmin** (0–2)	–	5,083	5–7	–
March 8	7:00 pm	LHN	Sam Houston State*		UFCU Disch–Falk Field • Austin, TX	**W** 12–3	**Cooper** (1–0)	Brown (0–2)	–	4,710	6–7	–
March 11	8:00 pm		at #23 UCLA*		Jackie Robinson Stadium • Los Angeles, CA	**W** 7–5	**Malmin** (1–2)	Canning (2–1)	Kingham (1)	731	7–7	–
March 12	4:00 pm		at #23 UCLA*		Jackie Robinson Stadium • Los Angeles, CA	**L** 4–5	Gadsby (1–0)	**Wellmann** (0–1)	–	1,260	7–8	–
March 13	2:00pm		at #23 UCLA*		Jackie Robinson Stadium • Los Angeles, CA	**L** 3–6	Molnar (1–1)	**Malmin** (1–3)	Gadsby (4)	1,644	7–9	–
March 15	6:35 pm	SECN+	at #3 Texas A&M*		Olsen Field at Blue Bell Park • College Station, TX	**L** 4–5	Ecker (1–0)	**Culbreth** (2–2)	–	6,965	7–10	–
March 18	6:00 pm	LHN	#28 Tulane*		UFCU Disch–Falk Field • Austin, TX	**L** 2–3	Massey (2–1)	**Mayes** (0–2)	–	4,587	7–11	–
March 19	6:00 pm	LHN	#28 Tulane*		UFCU Disch–Falk Field • Austin, TX	**W** 10–3	**Culbreth** (3–2)	Massey (2–2)	**Wellmann** (1)	5,297	8–11	–
March 20	12:00 pm	LHN	#28 Tulane*		UFCU Disch–Falk Field • Austin, TX	**L** 3–5	Simms (4–0)	**Duke** (1–1)	Rankin (1)	4,737	8–12	–
March 22	6:00 pm	LHN	UTSA*		UFCU Disch–Falk Field • Austin, TX	**W** 11–2	**Kingham** (1–1)	Shewcraft (3–3)	–	4,560	9–12	–
March 24	6:00 pm	LHN	#9 TCU		UFCU Disch–Falk Field • Austin, TX	**W** 4–3	**Duke** (2–1)	Baker (2–1)	**Mayes** (1)	4,828	10–12	1–0
March 25	6:00 pm	LHN	#9 TCU		UFCU Disch–Falk Field • Austin, TX	**W** 2–0	**Culbreth** (4–2)	Howard (4–1)	**Mayes** (2)	4,004	11–12	2–0
March 26	2:30 pm	FS1	#9 TCU		UFCU Disch–Falk Field • Austin, TX	**L** 5–9	Burnett (1–0)	**Kingham** (1–2)	–	7,093	11–13	2–1
March 29	6:00 pm	LHN	Lamar*		UFCU Disch–Falk Field • Austin, TX	**L** 2–4	Johnson (6–0)	**Mayes** (0–3)	Oquendo (3)	4,391	11–14	–

April

Date	Time (CT)	TV	Opponent	Rank	Site/stadium	Score	Win	Loss	Save	Attendance	Overall	Big 12
April 1	7:00 pm	FS1	at Oklahoma		L. Dale Mitchell Baseball Park • Norman, OK	**L** 1–6	Andritsos (4–2)	**Cooper** (1–1)	–	1,392	11–15	2–2
April 2	3:00 pm	FSOK	at Oklahoma		L. Dale Mitchell Baseball Park • Norman, OK	**W** 5–3	**Culbreth** (5–2)	Madden (1–1)	**Sawyer** (1)	1,826	12–15	3–2
April 3	1:00 pm	FSOK	at Oklahoma		L. Dale Mitchell Baseball Park • Norman, OK	**L** 3–4	Neuse (1–1)	**Mayes** (0–4)	–	1,260	12–16	3–3
April 5	7:00 pm	LHN	Texas A&M–Corpus Christi*		UFCU Disch–Falk Field • Austin, TX	**L** 0–5	Hernandez (2–3)	**Kingham** (1–3)	Skapura (1)	4,654	12–17	–
April 8	6:30 pm	COX KS	at Kansas State		Tointon Family Stadium • Manhattan, KS	**W** 6–3	**Cooper** (2–1)	Rigler (2–6)	**Shugart** (2)	2,331	13–17	4–3
April 9	2:00 pm		at Kansas State		Tointon Family Stadium • Manhattan, KS	**W** 12–5	**Culbreth** (6–2)	MaVorhis (3–3)	–	2,331	14–17	5–3
April 10	1:00 pm		at Kansas State		Tointon Family Stadium • Manhattan, KS	**L** 2–3	Benenati (1–1)	**Shugart** (1–1)	–	2,331	14–18	5–4
April 12	6:30 pm		Houston*		Constellation Field • Sugar Land, TX	**L** 2–3	Combie (1–1)	**Kennedy** (0–1)	Hernandez (6)		14–19	5-4
April 15	4:00 pm	LHN	Kansas		UFCU Disch–Falk Field • Austin, TX	**L** 5–11		Krauth (3–4)	**Cooper** (2–2)	–	14–20	5–5
April 15	8:00 pm	LHN	Kansas		UFCU Disch–Falk Field • Austin, TX	**W** 8–6	**Johnston** (2–1)	Weiman (1–4)	–		15–20	6–5
April 16	4:30 pm	LHN	Kansas		UFCU Disch–Falk Field • Austin, TX	**W** 12–2	**Culbreth** (7–2)	Goddard (2–3)	–		16–20	7–5
April 19	6:00 pm	LHN	UTRGV*		UFCU Disch–Falk Field • Austin, TX	**W** 7–5	**Ridgeway** (1–0)	Delgado (0–1)	**Shugart** (3)		17–20	7–5
April 22	6:30 pm	FSSW+	at #7 Texas Tech		Dan Law Field at Rip Griffin Park • Lubbock, TX	**L** 6–13	Martin (6–0)	**Dunbar** (0–1)	–		17–21	7–6
April 23	2:00 pm	FSSW+	at #7 Texas Tech		Dan Law Field at Rip Griffin Park • Lubbock, TX	**W** 7–4	**Culbreth** (8–2)	Moseley (4–3)	**Kingham** (2)		18–21	8–6
April 24	2:00 pm	FSSW+	at #7 Texas Tech		Dan Law Field at Rip Griffin Park • Lubbock, TX	**W** 17–1	**Johnston** (3–1)	Howard (6–2)	–		19–21	9–6
April 26	6:00 pm	LHN	Texas State*		UFCU Disch–Falk Field • Austin, TX	**W** 6–2	**Ridgeway** (2–0)	Hallonquist (3–4)	–		20–21	9–6
April 30	2:30 pm	LHN	Oklahoma State		UFCU Disch–Falk Field • Austin, TX	**L** 0–3	Hatch (4–1)	**Cooper** (2–3)	–		20–22	9–7
April 30		LHN	Oklahoma State		UFCU Disch–Falk Field • Austin, TX	**L** 3–6	Elliott (6–2)	**Culbreth** (8–3)	Buffett (8)		20–23	9–8

May

Date	Time (CT)	TV	Opponent	Rank	Site/stadium	Score	Win	Loss	Save	Attendance	Overall	Big 12
May 1	1:30 pm	LHN	Oklahoma State		UFCU Disch–Falk Field • Austin, TX	**L** 4–8					20–24	9–9
May 3	6:00 pm	LHN	Prairie View A&M*		UFCU Disch–Falk Field • Austin, TX	**W** 7–0					21–24	9–9
May 6	5:30 pm		at West Virginia		Monongalia County Ballpark • Granville, WV	**L** 2–11					21–25	9–10
May 7	3:00 pm		at West Virginia		Monongalia County Ballpark • Granville, WV	**L** 7–14					21–26	9–11
May 8	12:00 pm		at West Virginia		Monongalia County Ballpark • Granville, WV	**L** 5–9					21–27	9–12
May 17	6:00 pm	LHN	Texas State*		UFCU Disch–Falk Field • Austin, TX	**L** 2–3					21–28	9–12
May 19	6:00 pm	LHN	Baylor		UFCU Disch–Falk Field • Austin, TX	**L** 1–2					21–29	9–13
May 20	6:00 pm	LHN	Baylor		UFCU Disch–Falk Field • Austin, TX	**L** 1–3					21–30	9–14
May 21	2:00 pm	LHN	Baylor		UFCU Disch–Falk Field • Austin, TX	**W** 7–6					22–30	10–14

Post-Season
Big 12 Tournament

Date	Time (CT)	TV	Opponent	Rank	Site/stadium	Score	Win	Loss	Save	Attendance	Overall	Big 12 Tourn.
May 25	TBD		Oklahoma State		Chickasaw Bricktown Ballpark • Oklahoma City, OK	**L** 4–10					22–31	0-1
May 26	TBD		Baylor		Chickasaw Bricktown Ballpark • Oklahoma City, OK	**W** 15–3					23–31	1-1
May 27	TBD		Oklahoma State		Chickasaw Bricktown Ballpark • Oklahoma City, OK	**W** 12–8					24–31	2-1
May 28	TBD		TCU		Chickasaw Bricktown Ballpark • Oklahoma City, OK	**W** 2–1					25–31	3-1
May 29	TBD		TCU		Chickasaw Bricktown Ballpark • Oklahoma City, OK	**L** 2–8					25–32	3-2

Legend: = Win = Loss Bold = Texas team member

All rankings from Collegiate Baseball.

== Rankings ==
Ranking movements Legend: ██ Increase in ranking ██ Decrease in ranking — = Not ranked RV = Received votes
	Week																		
Poll	Pre	1	2	3	4	5	6	7	8	9	10	11	12	13	14	15	16	17	Final
Coaches'	RV	RV*	RV*	RV	—	—	—	—											
Baseball America	—	—	—	—	—	—	—	—											
Collegiate Baseball^	40	—	—	—	—	—	—	—											
NCBWA†	29	—	—	—	—	—	—	—											

^ Collegiate Baseball ranked 40 teams in their preseason poll, but only ranked 30 teams weekly during the season.
† NCBWA ranks 30 teams in their preseason poll, but only ranks 25 teams weekly during the season.
* A new poll was not released for this week, so for comparison purposes, the previous week's ranking is inserted in this week's slot.
