= 2016 Oklahoma Sooners baseball team =

American college baseball season

2016 Oklahoma Sooners baseball
- Conference: Big 12 Conference
- Record: 17–15–1 (4–5 Big 12)
- Head coach: Pete Hughes (3rd season)
- Assistant coaches: Mike Anderson (3rd season); Jamie Pinzino (3rd season); Rudy Darrow (1st season)
- Home stadium: L. Dale Mitchell Baseball Park

2016 Big 12 Conference baseball standings
	Conf.						Overall
Team	W		L		T	PCT	W		L		T	PCT
No. 5 Texas Tech ‍†‍‍^{y}	19	–	5	–	0	.792	47	–	20	–	0	.701
No. 4 Oklahoma State ‍‍‍^{y}	16	–	8	–	0	.667	43	–	22	–	0	.662
No. 3 TCU ‍‍‡‍^{y}	15	–	9	–	0	.625	49	–	18	–	0	.731
West Virginia ‍‍‍	12	–	11	–	0	.522	36	–	22	–	0	.621
Oklahoma ‍‍‍	11	–	13	–	0	.458	30	–	27	–	1	.526
Baylor ‍‍‍	10	–	14	–	0	.417	24	–	29	–	0	.453
Texas ‍‍‍	10	–	14	–	0	.417	25	–	32	–	0	.439
Kansas State ‍‍‍	8	–	16	–	0	.333	26	–	31	–	0	.456
Kansas ‍‍‍	6	–	17	–	0	.261	20	–	35	–	1	.366
† – Conference champion ‡ – Tournament champion y – Invited to the NCAA tournament Rankings from Collegiate Baseball

The 2016 Oklahoma Sooners baseball team represented the University of Oklahoma during the 2016 NCAA Division I baseball season. The Sooners played their home games at L. Dale Mitchell Baseball Park as a member of the Big 12 Conference. They were led by head coach Pete Hughes, in his third season at Oklahoma.

== Previous season ==
The 2015 Oklahoma Sooners baseball team notched a 34–27 (13–11) record and finished fourth in the Big 12 Conference standings. The Sooners reached the 2015 Big 12 Conference baseball tournament semifinal, where they were eliminated by Oklahoma State. Oklahoma did not receive an at-large bid to the 2015 NCAA Division I baseball tournament.

== Personnel ==
=== Roster ===
2016 Oklahoma Sooners Roster
Pitchers: 11 – Thomas Hughes (RHP) – Freshman; 12 – Keaton Hernandez (RHP) – Senior; 13 – Ryan Madden (RHP) – Freshman; 15 – Kyle Tyler (RHP) – Freshman; 18 – Chris Andritsos (RHP) – Freshman; 21 – Alex Daniele (RHP) – Junior; 22 – Sheldon Neuse (RHP) – Junior; 23 – Dylan Grove (RHP) – Freshman; 25 – J.B. Olson (RHP) – Junior; 27 – Jake Irvin (RHP) – Freshman; 28 – Shawn Hunter (LHP) – Senior; 31 – Kenny Saenz (LHP) – Sophomore; 32 – Joey Zurawik (RHP) – Junior; 33 – Jake Elliott (RHP) – Junior; 35 – Alec Hansen (RHP) – Junior; 36 – Austin Kerns (LHP) – Junior; 38 – Austin Hansen (RHP) – Freshman; 40 – Connor Berry (RHP) – Freshman	Catchers: 6 – Chandler Wagoner – (redshirt) Freshman; 9 – Domenic DeRenzo – Freshman; 39 – Hunter Southerland – Freshman; 41 – Renae Martinez – Junior; Infielders: 3 – Cade Harris – Freshman; 5 – Kyle Mendenhall – Sophomore; 7 – Alex Wise – Senior; 8 – Cameron Frazier – Sophomore; 11 – Thomas Hughes – Freshman; 22 – Sheldon Neuse – Junior; 29 – Quin Walbergh – Sophomore; 42 – Jack Flansburg – Junior; 44 – Austin O'Brien – Junior	Outfielders: 1 – Steele Walker – Freshman; 2 – Blake Brewster – Freshman; 4 – Hunter Haley – Junior; 7 – Alex Wise – Senior; 8 – Cameron Frazier – Sophomore; 20 – Reggie Wright – Junior; 24 – Cody Thomas – Junior; 30 – Ben Hollas – Junior; 39 – Hunter Southerland – Freshman

=== Coaching staff ===
Name	Position	Seasons at Oklahoma	Alma mater
Pete Hughes	Head coach	3	Davidson College (1990)
Mike Anderson	Assistant coach	3	University of Northern Colorado (1990)
Jamie Pinzino	Assistant coach	3	Tufts University (1997)
Rudy Darrow	Volunteer Assistant Coach	1	Nicholls State University (2004)

== Schedule and results ==
2016 Oklahoma Sooners baseball game log
Legend: = Win = Loss = Tie Bold = Oklahoma team member
Regular season

February
Date	Time (CT)	TV	Opponent	Rank	Site/stadium	Score	Win	Loss	Save	Attendance	Overall	Big 12
February 19	4:00 pm		Northeastern*		L. Dale Mitchell Baseball Park • Norman, OK	**L** 2–3	Civale (1–0)	**Hunter** (0–1)	Fitzgerald (1)	1,720	0–1	–
February 20	1:00 pm		Northeastern*		L. Dale Mitchell Baseball Park • Norman, OK	**L** 3–5	Misiaszek (1–0)	**A. Hansen** (0–1)	–	1,821	0–2	–
February 20	4:30 pm		Northeastern*		L. Dale Mitchell Baseball Park • Norman, OK	**W** 10–4	**Kerns** (1–0)	Mulry (0–1)	**Neuse** (1)	1,821	1–2	–
February 21	12:00 pm		Northeastern*		L. Dale Mitchell Baseball Park • Norman, OK	**W** 13–4	**Au. Hansen** (1–0)	Jahn (0–1)	–	925	2–2	–
February 24	4:00 pm		Abilene Christian*		L. Dale Mitchell Baseball Park • Norman, OK	**W** 7–1	**Andritsos** (1–0)	Cole (0–1)	–	609	3–2	–
February 26	6:30 pm		at Sam Houston State*		Don Sanders Stadium • Huntsville, TX	**L** 3–4	Odom (1–0)	**Berry** (0–1)	Rahm (1)	1,160	3–3	–
February 27	3:00 pm		at Sam Houston State*		Don Sanders Stadium • Huntsville, TX	**L** 2–7	Donica (1–0)	**Kerns** (1–1)	Cannon (1)	1,263	3–4	–
February 28	1:00 pm		at Sam Houston State*		Don Sanders Stadium • Huntsville, TX	**L** 3–4^{11}	Manning (1–1)	**Neuse** (0–1)	–	1,219	3–5	–

March
Date	Time (CT)	TV	Opponent	Rank	Site/stadium	Score	Win	Loss	Save	Attendance	Overall	Big 12
March 1	4:00 pm		Central Arkansas*		L. Dale Mitchell Baseball Park • Norman, OK	**W** 3–0	**Andritsos** (2–0)	Neal (0–1)	**Berry** (1)	650	4–5	–
March 4	8:00 pm		at USC*		Dedeaux Field • Los Angeles, CA (Dodger Stadium Classic)	**L** 4–5	Davis (2–1)	**Hernandez** (0–1)	Wegman (1)	1,232	4–6	–
March 5	8:00 pm		at #21 UCLA*		Jackie Robinson Stadium • Los Angeles, CA (Dodger Stadium Classic)	**L** 2–4	Ceja (1–0)	**A. Hansen** (0–2)	Gadsby (3)	1,149	4–7	–
March 6	1:00 pm		#23 Mississippi State*		Dodger Stadium • Los Angeles, CA (Dodger Stadium Classic)	**T** 5–5	–	–	–	1,543	4–7–1	–
March 8	6:00 pm	SSTV	Wichita State*		L. Dale Mitchell Baseball Park • Norman, OK	**W** 4–2	**Au. Hansen** (2–0)	Tyler (0–1)	**Olson** (1)	786	5–7–1	–
March 12	2:00 pm	SSTV	#30 Long Beach State*		L. Dale Mitchell Baseball Park • Norman, OK	**L** 3–7	Mathewson (2–2)	**A. Hansen** (0–3)	–	1,086	5–8–1	–
March 12	5:45 pm	SSTV	#30 Long Beach State*		L. Dale Mitchell Baseball Park • Norman, OK	**L** 3–6	McCaughan (3–0)	**Andritsos** (2–1)	Rivera (6)	1,086	5–9–1	–
March 13	1:00 pm	SSTV	#30 Long Beach State*		L. Dale Mitchell Baseball Park • Norman, OK	**W** 6–3	**Olson** (1–0)	Rivera (0–1)	–	786	6–9–1	–
March 15	8:00 pm		at Fresno State*		Pete Beiden Field • Fresno, CA	**W** 3–2	**Madden** (1–0)	Arias (2–2)	**Olson** (2)	1,295	7–9–1	–
March 17	8:00 pm		at Cal State Bakersfield*		Hardt Field • Bakersfield, CA	**W** 6–4	**Au. Hansen** (3–0)	Nimmo (1–2)	**Neuse** (2)	–	8–9–1	–
March 18	8:00 pm		at Cal State Bakersfield*		Hardt Field • Bakersfield, CA	**W** 6–3	**Hunter** (1–1)	Hansen (1–3)	**Neuse** (3)	849	9–9–1	–
March 19	2:00 pm		at Cal State Bakersfield*		Hardt Field • Bakersfield, CA	**W** 10–7	**Au. Hansen** (4–0)	Luna (0–1)	**Olson** (3)	703	10–9–1	–
March 19	5:30 pm		at Cal State Bakersfield*		Hardt Field • Bakersfield, CA	**W** 13–0	**Andritsos** (3–1)	Monarrez (1–2)	–	703	11–9–1	–
March 22	6:30 pm		at Oral Roberts*		J. L. Johnson Stadium • Tulsa, OK	**L** 0–5	Tims (2–0)	**Hunter** (1–2)	–	1,591	11–10–1	–
March 24	6:30 pm	FSSW+	at Texas Tech		Dan Law Field at Rip Griffin Park • Lubbock, TX	**L** 0–5	Martin (3–0)	**A. Hansen** (0–4)	Howard (1)	3,231	11–11–1	0–1
March 25	6:30 pm		at Texas Tech		Dan Law Field at Rip Griffin Park • Lubbock, TX	**L** 1–6	Gingery (2–1)	**Andritsos** (3–2)	–	4,014	11–12–1	0–2
March 26	2:00 pm		at Texas Tech		Dan Law Field at Rip Griffin Park • Lubbock, TX	**L** 7–13	Howard (5–1)	**Berry** (0–2)	Moseley (1)	4,432	11–13–1	0–3
March 29	6:00 pm		at Arkansas–Little Rock*		Gary Hogan Field • Little Rock, AR	**W** 5–2	**Tyler** (1–0)	Hazen (1–3)	**Neuse** (4)	821	12–13–1	–

April
Date	Time (CT)	TV	Opponent	Rank	Site/stadium	Score	Win	Loss	Save	Attendance	Overall	Big 12
April 1	7:00 pm	FS1	Texas		L. Dale Mitchell Baseball Park • Norman, OK	**W** 6–1	**Andritsos** (4–2)	Cooper (1–1)	–	1,392	13–13–1	1–3
April 2	3:00 pm	SSTV	Texas		L. Dale Mitchell Baseball Park • Norman, OK	**L** 3–5	Culbreth (5–2)	**Madden** (1–1)	Sawyer (1)	1,826	13–14–1	1–4
April 3	1:00 pm	SSTV	Texas		L. Dale Mitchell Baseball Park • Norman, OK	**W** 4–3	**Neuse** (1–1)	Mayes (0–4)	–	1,260	14–14–1	2–4
April 5	6:00 pm	SSTV	Dallas Baptist*		L. Dale Mitchell Baseball Park • Norman, OK	**W** 12–2	**Irvin** (1–0)	Johnson (2–2)	–	820	15–14–1	–
April 8	7:00 pm	SSTV	Baylor		L. Dale Mitchell Baseball Park • Norman, OK	**W** 4–3	**Neuse** (2–1)	Heineman (2–2)	–	1,370	16–14–1	3–4
April 9	3:00 pm		Baylor		L. Dale Mitchell Baseball Park • Norman, OK	**L** 1–6	Tolson (4–1)	**Madden** (1–2)	Montemayor (7)	1,633	16–15–1	3–5
April 10	1:00 pm	SSTV	Baylor		L. Dale Mitchell Baseball Park • Norman, OK	**W** 7–6^{11}	**Neuse** (3–1)	McInvale (2–2)	–	938	17–15–1	4–5
April 12	6:30 pm		at Wichita State*		Eck Stadium • Wichita, KS							
April 15	7:00 pm	FS1	at #11 TCU		Lupton Stadium • Fort Worth, TX							
April 16	3:00 pm	FSSW+	at #11 TCU		Lupton Stadium • Fort Worth, TX							
April 17	1:00 pm	ESPNU	at #11 TCU		Lupton Stadium • Fort Worth, TX							
April 19	6:00 pm	SSTV	Oklahoma State*		L. Dale Mitchell Baseball Park • Norman, OK							
April 22	6:30 pm	SSTV	West Virginia		L. Dale Mitchell Baseball Park • Norman, OK							
April 23	2:00 pm	SSTV	West Virginia		L. Dale Mitchell Baseball Park • Norman, OK							
April 24	1:00 pm	SSTV	West Virginia		L. Dale Mitchell Baseball Park • Norman, OK							
April 29	6:00 pm	ESPN3	at Kansas		Hoglund Ballpark • Lawrence, KS							
April 30	2:00 pm	ESPN3	at Kansas		Hoglund Ballpark • Lawrence, KS							

May
Date	Time (CT)	TV	Opponent	Rank	Site/stadium	Score	Win	Loss	Save	Attendance	Overall	Big 12
May 1	1:00 pm	ESPN3	at Kansas		Hoglund Ballpark • Lawrence, KS							
May 3	6:00 pm	SSTV	Oral Roberts*		L. Dale Mitchell Baseball Park • Norman, OK							
May 6	6:00 pm	SSTV	Kansas State		L. Dale Mitchell Baseball Park • Norman, OK							
May 7	3:00 pm	SSTV	Kansas State		L. Dale Mitchell Baseball Park • Norman, OK							
May 8	1:00 pm	SSTV	Kansas State		L. Dale Mitchell Baseball Park • Norman, OK							
May 13	6:30 pm	ESPNU	Oklahoma State		Bricktown Ballpark • Oklahoma City, OK							
May 14	7:30 pm		Oklahoma State		ONEOK Field • Tulsa, OK							
May 15	2:00 pm		Oklahoma State		ONEOK Field • Tulsa, OK							
May 17	4:00 pm		at Missouri*		Taylor Stadium • Columbia, MO							
May 19	6:00 pm		at Austin Peay*		Raymond C. Hand Park • Clarksville, TN							
May 20	6:00 pm		at Austin Peay*		Raymond C. Hand Park • Clarksville, TN							
May 21	1:00 pm		at Austin Peay*		Raymond C. Hand Park • Clarksville, TN							

Post-Season

Big 12 Tournament
Date	Time (CT)	TV	Opponent	Rank	Site/stadium	Score	Win	Loss	Save	Attendance	Overall	Big 12 Tourn.
May 25	TBD		TBD		Chickasaw Bricktown Ballpark • Oklahoma City, OK							
May 26	TBD		TBD		Chickasaw Bricktown Ballpark • Oklahoma City, OK							

All rankings from Collegiate Baseball.

== Rankings ==
Ranking movements Legend: ██ Increase in ranking ██ Decrease in ranking — = Not ranked RV = Received votes
	Week																		
Poll	Pre	1	2	3	4	5	6	7	8	9	10	11	12	13	14	15	16	17	Final
Coaches'	—	—*	—*	—	—	—	—	—											
Baseball America	21	25	—	—	—	—	—	—											
Collegiate Baseball^	RV	—	—	—	—	—	—	—											
NCBWA†	30	RV	—	—	—	—	—	—											

^ Collegiate Baseball ranked 40 teams in their preseason poll, but only ranked 30 teams weekly during the season.
† NCBWA ranks 30 teams in their preseason poll, but only ranks 25 teams weekly during the season.
* A new poll was not released for this week, so for comparison purposes, the previous week's ranking is inserted in this week's slot.
