= 2016 Kansas Jayhawks baseball team =

American college baseball season

2016 Kansas Jayhawks baseball
- Conference: Big 12 Conference
- Record: 12–18 (2–6 Big 12)
- Head coach: Ritch Price (14th season)
- Assistant coaches: Ryan Graves (14th season); Ritchie Price (5th season); Scott Hood (4th season)
- Home stadium: Hoglund Ballpark

2016 Big 12 Conference baseball standings
	Conf.						Overall
Team	W		L		T	PCT	W		L		T	PCT
No. 5 Texas Tech ‍†‍‍^{y}	19	–	5	–	0	.792	47	–	20	–	0	.701
No. 4 Oklahoma State ‍‍‍^{y}	16	–	8	–	0	.667	43	–	22	–	0	.662
No. 3 TCU ‍‍‡‍^{y}	15	–	9	–	0	.625	49	–	18	–	0	.731
West Virginia ‍‍‍	12	–	11	–	0	.522	36	–	22	–	0	.621
Oklahoma ‍‍‍	11	–	13	–	0	.458	30	–	27	–	1	.526
Baylor ‍‍‍	10	–	14	–	0	.417	24	–	29	–	0	.453
Texas ‍‍‍	10	–	14	–	0	.417	25	–	32	–	0	.439
Kansas State ‍‍‍	8	–	16	–	0	.333	26	–	31	–	0	.456
Kansas ‍‍‍	6	–	17	–	0	.261	20	–	35	–	1	.366
† – Conference champion ‡ – Tournament champion y – Invited to the NCAA tournament Rankings from Collegiate Baseball

The 2016 Kansas Jayhawks baseball team represent the University of Kansas during the 2016 NCAA Division I baseball season. The Jayhawks play their home games at Hoglund Ballpark as a member of the Big 12 Conference. They are led by head coach Ritch Price, in his 14th season at Kansas.

== Previous season ==
The 2015 Kansas Jayhawks baseball team notched a 23–32 (8–15) record and finished ninth in the Big 12 Conference standings. The Jayhawks did not qualify for the 2015 Big 12 Conference baseball tournament or receive at-large bid to the 2015 NCAA Division I baseball tournament.

== Personnel ==
=== Roster ===
2016 Kansas Jayhawks Roster
Pitchers: 10 - Jon Hander (RHP) - (redshirt) Sophomore; 12 - Ryan Ralston (RHP) - Sophomore; 17 - Brandon Johnson (RHP) - Sophomore; 19 - Casey Douglas (RHP) - Sophomore; 20 - Jackson Goddard (RHP) - Freshman; 21 - Sean Rackoski (RHP) - Junior; 22 - Ben Krauth (LHP) - Senior; 26 - Tyler Davis (RHP) - Sophomore; 29 - Sam Gilbert (RHP) - Senior; 31 - Chris Fearon (RHP) - Freshman; 32 - Ryan Jackson (LHP) - Sophomore; 36 - Blake Goldsberry (RHP) - Freshman; 38 - Hayden Edwards (RHP) - Senior; 40 - Stephen Villines (RHP) - Junior; 44 - Blake Weiman (LHP) - Sophomore; 46 - Jeremy Kravetz (LHP) - Junior; 59 - Zack Leban (RHP) - Freshman	Catchers: 8 - T.J. Martin - Sophomore; 11 - Tanner Gragg - Sophomore; 34 - Michael Tinsley - Junior; 35 - John Remick - Junior; Infielders: 3 - David Kyriacou - Freshman; 4 - Owen Taylor - Sophomore; 5 - Matt McLaughlin - Sophomore; 7 - Ty Denzer - Freshman; 15 - Tommy Mirabelli - Senior; 23 - Ryan Pidhaichuk - Senior; 24 - Colby Wright - Senior; 28 - Blake Shinkle - Freshman; 33 - Marcus Wheeler - Junior; 42 - Rudy Karre - Freshman	Outfielders: 1 - Joven Afenir - Junior; 7 - Ty Denzer - Freshman; 14 - Joe Moroney - (redshirt) Senior; 25 - Peyton Grassanovits - Freshman; 27 - Devin Foyle - Freshman; 30 - M.J. Farthing - Junior; 42 - Rudy Karre - Freshman; 48 - Steve Goldstein - Senior

=== Coaching staff ===
Name	Position	Seasons at Kansas	Alma mater
Ritch Price	Head coach	14	Willamette University (1978)
Ryan Graves	Associate Head Coach	14	Oklahoma State University (1996)
Ritchie Price	Assistant coach	5	University of Kansas (2007)
Scott Hood	Volunteer Coach	4	South Dakota State University (2011)

== Schedule and results ==
2016 Kansas Jayhawks baseball game log
Legend: = Win = Loss Bold = Kansas team member
Regular season

February
Date	Time (CT)	TV	Opponent	Rank	Site/stadium	Score	Win	Loss	Save	Attendance	Overall	Big 12
February 20	3:00 pm		at Arkansas–Little Rock*		Gary Hogan Field • Little Rock, AR	**L** 2–4	Hazen (1–0)	**Krauth** (0–1)	Wingfield (1)	653	0–1	–
February 22	3:00 pm	ESPN3	Northern Colorado*		Hoglund Ballpark • Lawrence, KS	**W** 5–4	**Villines** (1–0)	Carroll (0–1)	–	895	1–1	–
February 23	3:00 pm	ESPN3	Northern Colorado*		Hoglund Ballpark • Lawrence, KS	**W** 2–1	**Leban** (1–0)	Love (0–1)	**Villines** (1)	798	2–1	–
February 26	6:00 pm		Utah*		Surprise Stadium • Surprise, AZ (Big 12/Pac-12 Challenge)	**L** 1–15	Rose (1–0)	**Hander** (0–1)	–	307	2–2	–
February 27	2:00 pm		#8 Oregon State*		Surprise Stadium • Surprise, AZ (Big 12/Pac-12 Challenge)	**L** 3–9	Fehmel (3–0)	**Gilbert** (0–1)	–	3,133	2–3	–
February 28	11:00 am		#8 Oregon State*		Surprise Stadium • Surprise, AZ (Big 12/Pac-12 Challenge)	**L** 1–3	Heinlich (2–0)	**Goddard** (0–1)	Engelbrekt (4)	1,736	2–4	–
February 29	12:00 pm		Utah*		Surprise Stadium • Surprise, AZ (Big 12/Pac-12 Challenge)	**W** 8–4	**Villines** (2–0)	Drachler (0–1)	–	374	3–4	–

March
Date	Time (CT)	TV	Opponent	Rank	Site/stadium	Score	Win	Loss	Save	Attendance	Overall	Big 12
March 3	3:00 pm	ESPN3	BYU*		Hoglund Ballpark • Lawrence, KS	**L** 10–11	Burrup (2–1)	**Leban** (1–1)	Cenatiempo (1)	821	3–5	–
March 4	3:00 pm	ESPN3	BYU*		Hoglund Ballpark • Lawrence, KS	**L** 2–8	Buffo (2–0)	**Krauth** (0–2)	Wood (1)	990	3–6	–
March 5	12:00 pm	ESPN3	BYU*		Hoglund Ballpark • Lawrence, KS	**L** (6–7)	Cenatiempo (1–0)	**Villines** (2–1)	Marshall (2)	976	3–7	–
March 11	3:00 pm	ESPN3	North Dakota*		Hoglund Ballpark • Lawrence, KS (Millard Management Classic)	**W** 7–0	**Krauth** (1–2)	Muckenhirn (1–2)	–	868	4–7	–
March 12	3:00 pm	ESPN3	Saint Louis*		Hoglund Ballpark • Lawrence, KS (Millard Management Classic)	**W** 5–3	**Goddard** (1–1)	Moore (1–2)	**Villines** (2)	887	5–7	–
March 12	6:30 pm	ESPN3	Purdue*		Hoglund Ballpark • Lawrence, KS (Millard Management Classic)	**W** 8–1	**Weiman** (1–0)	Dalesandro (0–3)	**Goldsberry** (1)	887	6–7	–
March 15	3:00 pm	ESPN3	Murray State*		Hoglund Ballpark • Lawrence, KS	**L** 9–14	Dubsky (1–2)	**Goldsberry** (0–1)	–	902	6–8	–
March 16	3:00 pm	ESPN3	Murray State*		Hoglund Ballpark • Lawrence, KS	**W** 14–8	**Gilbert** (1–1)	Baxter (0–1)	**Villines** (3)	998	7–8	–
March 18	9:00 pm		at Stanford*		Klein Field at Sunken Diamond • Stanford, CA	**L** 0–2	Beck (3–1)	**Krauth** (1–3)	Viall (1)	1,309	7–9	–
March 19	5:00 pm		at Stanford*		Klein Field at Sunken Diamond • Stanford, CA	**L** 4–10	Castellanos (2–1)	**Goldsberry** (0–2)	–	1,524	7–10	–
March 20	2:00 pm		at Stanford*		Klein Field at Sunken Diamond • Stanford, CA	**L** 2–6	Summerville (2–1)	**Weiman** (1–1)	–	1,469	7–11	–
March 25	6:00 pm	ESPN3	West Virginia		Hoglund Ballpark • Lawrence, KS	**L** 0–1	Donato (1–2)	**Krauth** (1–4)	Smith (3)	900	7–12	0–1
March 26	2:00 pm	ESPN3	West Virginia		Hoglund Ballpark • Lawrence, KS	**L** 6–11	Dotson (4–1)	**Goldsberry** (0–3)	Hardy (1)	826	7–13	0–2
March 29	6:00 pm	ESPN3	Missouri State*		Hoglund Ballpark • Lawrence, KS	**W** 2–1	**Goddard** (2–1)	Dunne (0–1)	**Villines** (4)	835	8–13	–
March 30	3:30 pm	ESPN3	Benedictine College*		Hoglund Ballpark • Lawrence, KS	**W** 19–7	**Davis** (1–0)	Temperelli (0–4)	–	675	9–13	–

April
Date	Time (CT)	TV	Opponent	Rank	Site/stadium	Score	Win	Loss	Save	Attendance	Overall	Big 12
April 1	6:30 pm	FSSW+	at Baylor		Baylor Ballpark • Waco, TX	**W** 6–1	**Krauth** (2–4)	Castano (2–4)	–	2,080	10–13	1–2
April 2	3:00 pm	FSSW+	at Baylor		Baylor Ballpark • Waco, TX	**L** 1–2	Tolson (3–1)	**Weiman** (1–2)	Montemayor (5)	3,066	10–14	1–3
April 3	1:00 pm	FSSW+	at Baylor		Baylor Ballpark • Waco, TX	**L** 2–5	Hill (1–1)	**Goddard** (2–2)	Montemayor (6)	2,128	10–15	1–4
April 5	3:00 pm	ESPN3	at Baker*		Hoglund Ballpark • Lawrence, KS	**W** 6–1	**Edwards** (1–0)	Johnson (1–3)	–	702	11–15	–
April 6	6:30 pm		at #16 Missouri State*		Hammons Field • Springfield, MO	**L** 11–18	Fromson (4–0)	**Goldsberry** (0–4)	–	690	11–16	–
April 8	6:00 pm	ESPN3	#10 TCU		Hoglund Ballpark • Lawrence, KS	**W** 4–3	**Villines** (3–1)	Janczak (4–2)	–	1,317	12–16	2–4
April 9	6:00 pm	ESPN3	#10 TCU		Hoglund Ballpark • Lawrence, KS	**L** 0–8	Horton (5–0)	**Weiman** (1–3)	–	1,237	12–17	2–5
April 10	1:00 pm	ESPN3	#10 TCU		Hoglund Ballpark • Lawrence, KS	**L** 6–14	Trieglaff (4–0)	**Goldsberry** (0–5)	–	1,311	12–18	2–6
April 13	6:00 pm	ESPN3	Omaha*		Hoglund Ballpark • Lawrence, KS							
April 15	6:00 pm	LHN	at Texas		UFCU Disch–Falk Field • Austin, TX							
April 16	4:30 pm	LHN	at Texas		UFCU Disch–Falk Field • Austin, TX							
April 17	1:00 pm	LHN	at Texas		UFCU Disch–Falk Field • Austin, TX							
April 19	6:00 pm	ESPN3	Wichita State*		Hoglund Ballpark • Lawrence, KS							
April 22	6:00 pm		at Samford*		Joe Lee Griffin Stadium • Birmingham, AL							
April 23	2:00 pm		at Samford*		Joe Lee Griffin Stadium • Birmingham, AL							
April 24	12:00 pm		at Samford*		Joe Lee Griffin Stadium • Birmingham, AL							
April 26	6:00 pm	ESPN3	Grand Canyon*		Hoglund Ballpark • Lawrence, KS							
April 27	6:00 pm		Nebraska*		Kauffman Stadium • Kansas City, MO							
April 29	6:00 pm	ESPN3	Oklahoma		Hoglund Ballpark • Lawrence, KS							
April 30	2:00 pm	ESPN3	Oklahoma		Hoglund Ballpark • Lawrence, KS							

May
Date	Time (CT)	TV	Opponent	Rank	Site/stadium	Score	Win	Loss	Save	Attendance	Overall	Big 12
May 1	1:00 pm	ESPN3	Oklahoma		Hoglund Ballpark • Lawrence, KS							
May 3	6:30 pm		at Minnesota*		Siebert Field • Minneapolis, MN							
May 4	1:30 pm		at Minnesota*		Siebert Field • Minneapolis, MN							
May 6	6:00 pm	ESPN3	Texas Tech		Hoglund Ballpark • Lawrence, KS							
May 7	2:00 pm	ESPN3	Texas Tech		Hoglund Ballpark • Lawrence, KS							
May 8	1:00 pm	ESPN3	Texas Tech		Hoglund Ballpark • Lawrence, KS							
May 13	6:30 pm	COX KS	at Kansas State		Tointon Family Stadium • Manhattan, KS							
May 14	6:30 pm	COX KS	at Kansas State		Tointon Family Stadium • Manhattan, KS							
May 15	1:00 pm	COX KS	at Kansas State		Tointon Family Stadium • Manhattan, KS							
May 17	6:30 pm		at Wichita State*		Eck Stadium • Wichita, KS							
May 19	6:30 pm		at Oklahoma State		Reynolds Stadium • Stillwater, OK							
May 20	6:00 pm		at Oklahoma State		Reynolds Stadium • Stillwater, OK							
May 21	3:00 pm		at Oklahoma State		Reynolds Stadium • Stillwater, OK							

Post-Season

Big 12 Tournament
Date	Time (CT)	TV	Opponent	Rank	Site/stadium	Score	Win	Loss	Save	Attendance	Overall	Big 12 Tourn.
May 25	TBD	FCS	TBD		Bricktown Ballpark • Oklahoma City, OK							
May 26	TBD	FCS	TBD		Bricktown Ballpark • Oklahoma City, OK							

All rankings from Collegiate Baseball as-of the date of the contest.
