= 2016 Big 12 Conference baseball tournament =

American college baseball tournament

- Teams: 8
- Format: Double-elimination tournament
- Finals site: Chickasaw Bricktown Ballpark; Oklahoma City, OK
- Champions: TCU (2nd title)
- Winning coach: Jim Schlossnagle (2nd title)
- MVP: Luken Baker (TCU)
- Television: Bracket Play: FCS Central; Championship: FSN

2016 Big 12 Conference baseball standings
	Conf.						Overall
Team	W		L		T	PCT	W		L		T	PCT
No. 5 Texas Tech ‍†‍‍^{y}	19	–	5	–	0	.792	47	–	20	–	0	.701
No. 4 Oklahoma State ‍‍‍^{y}	16	–	8	–	0	.667	43	–	22	–	0	.662
No. 3 TCU ‍‍‡‍^{y}	15	–	9	–	0	.625	49	–	18	–	0	.731
West Virginia ‍‍‍	12	–	11	–	0	.522	36	–	22	–	0	.621
Oklahoma ‍‍‍	11	–	13	–	0	.458	30	–	27	–	1	.526
Baylor ‍‍‍	10	–	14	–	0	.417	24	–	29	–	0	.453
Texas ‍‍‍	10	–	14	–	0	.417	25	–	32	–	0	.439
Kansas State ‍‍‍	8	–	16	–	0	.333	26	–	31	–	0	.456
Kansas ‍‍‍	6	–	17	–	0	.261	20	–	35	–	1	.366
† – Conference champion ‡ – Tournament champion y – Invited to the NCAA tournament Rankings from Collegiate Baseball

The 2016 Big 12 Conference baseball tournament was held from May 25 through 29 at Chickasaw Bricktown Ballpark in Oklahoma City, Oklahoma. The annual tournament determined the conference champion of the Division I Big 12 Conference for college baseball. The TCU Horned Frogs won the Tournament Championship, and as the winner of the tournament, TCU earned the league's automatic bid to the 2016 NCAA Division I baseball tournament.

The tournament has been held since 1997, the inaugural year of the Big 12 Conference. Among current league members, Texas has won the most championships with five. Among original members, Baylor and Kansas State have never won the event. Iowa State discontinued their program after the 2001 season without having won a title. Having joined in 2013, TCU won their first title in 2014 while West Virginia has yet to win the Tournament.

The newest conference members, TCU and West Virginia, faced each other in the Championship game. Earlier in the season, TCU swept the regular season series over West Virginia. The Frogs won the 2014 Big 12 Tournament championship, and the Mountaineers' appearance in the tournament finale marked the first time since 1996 that WVU had played for a conference tournament championship. TCU won the championship game 11–10 in 10 innings.

== Format and seeding ==
The top eight finishers from the regular season will be seeded one through eight, and will then play a two-bracket double-elimination tournament leading to a winner-take-all championship game.

Place	Seed	Team	Conference					Overall			
Place	Seed	Team	W	L	T	%	GB	W	L	T	%
1	1	Texas Tech	19	5	0	.792	–	47	20	0	.701
2	2	Oklahoma State	16	8	0	.667	3	43	22	0	.662
3	3	TCU	15	9	0	.625	4	49	18	0	.731
4	4	West Virginia	12	11	0	.522	6.5	36	22	0	.621
5	5	Oklahoma	11	13	0	.458	8	30	27	1	.526
6	6	Baylor	10	14	0	.417	9	24	29	0	.453
6	7	Texas	10	14	0	.417	9	25	32	0	.439
8	8	Kansas State	8	16	0	.333	11	26	31	0	.456
9	–	Kansas	6	17	0	.261	12.5	20	35	1	.366

== Results ==
First round
1	Texas Tech	8
8	Kansas State	5
4	West Virginia	6
5	Oklahoma	0
8	Kansas State	7
5	Oklahoma	13
3	TCU	12
6	Baylor	5
2	Oklahoma State	10
7	Texas	4
6	Baylor	3
7	Texas	15

Second round
1	Texas Tech	4
4	West Virginia	9
5	Oklahoma	17
1	Texas Tech	4
3	TCU	13
2	Oklahoma State	5
7	Texas	12
2	Oklahoma State	8

Semifinals
4	West Virginia	11
5	Oklahoma	1
3	TCU	1	8
7	Texas	2	2

Final
4	West Virginia	10
3	TCU	11

== All-Tournament Team ==
Position	Player	School
C	Evan Skoug	TCU
1B	Kacy Clemens	Texas
2B	Cam Warner	TCU
SS	Bret Boswell	Texas
3B	Elliott Barzilli	TCU
OF	Tyler Neslony	Texas Tech
OF	Josh Watson	TCU
OF	KC Huth	West Virginia
DH	Luken Baker	TCU
DH	Kyle Davis	West Virginia
SP	Conner Dotson	West Virginia
SP	Brian Howard	TCU
RP	Ross Vance	West Virginia
CO-MOP	Luken Baker	TCU
CO-MOP	KC Huth	West Virginia
