= Paradise Independent School District =

School district in Texas

Address
- 338 Schoolhouse Rd Paradise, Wise County, Texas, 76073; United States

District information
- Superintendent: Dr. Paul Uttley
- Budget: $11.3 million (2015-2016)
- NCES District ID: 4834260

Students and staff
- Students: 1,193 (2017-2018)
- Teachers: 90.98 (2017-2018)
- Staff: 154.39 (2017-2018)

Other information
- Website: paradiseisd2.weebly.com

Paradise Independent School District is a public school district based in Paradise, Texas, United States.

In 2009, the school district was rated "recognized" by the Texas Education Agency.

== Schools ==
- Paradise High School (grades 9-12)
- Paradise Junior High School (grades 6-8)
- Paradise Intermediate School (grades 4-5)
- Paradise Elementary School (prekindergarten grade 3)

== Band ==
- Paradise High School Marching Band (grades 8-12) - The band has around 60 members and marches about 50 at any given time. The band has received two Superior and 2 Excellent ratings at the UIL Region II Marching Band Competition. After football season, the band begins what is known as concert season and works on just music for concerts and UIL Concert and Sight Reading Contest.
- Paradise Junior High Band (grade 7)
- Paradise Intermediate Band (grade 6)

== Sports ==
=== Cross country ===
The Paradise cross country team has a history of success spanning from the mid-1990s until now. Paradise has sent three teams and a large number of individuals to the state meet.

=== Powerlifting ===
The Paradise powerlifting team is one of the best in the state for its size. They have repeatedly sent many lifters to the state meet in Abilene.

=== Track and field ===
The Paradise track program is very solid and is frequently represented in the regional meets. In 2012, a 34-year-old school record in the 100 m sprint was broken by Chase Reynolds. The previous record time was 10.75 sec; Chase broke the record in the first meet of the season with a time of 10.65 sec.

== Controversy ==
In July 2024, the ACLU of Texas sent Paradise Independent School District a letter, alleging that the district's 2023-2024 dress and grooming code appeared to violate the Texas CROWN Act, a state law which prohibits racial discrimination based on hair texture or styles, and asking the district to revise its policies for the 2024-2025 school year.
