= Paradise, Texas =

- City
- Main Street in 1926

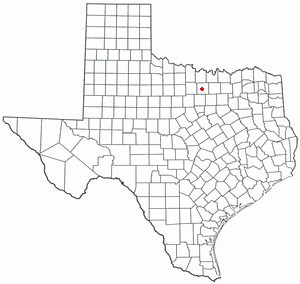
- Location of Paradise, Texas

- Coordinates: 33°09′01″N 97°41′19″W
- Country: United States
- State: Texas
- County: Wise
- Established: 1873

Area
  - Total: 2.01 sq mi (5.20 km^{2})
  - Land: 2.01 sq mi (5.20 km^{2})
  - Water: 0 sq mi (0.00 km^{2})
- Elevation: 764 ft (233 m)

Population (2020)
  - Total: 475
  - Density: 279.6/sq mi (107.97/km^{2})
- Time zone: UTC-6 (Central (CST))
  - Summer (DST): UTC-5 (CDT)
- ZIP code: 76073
- Area code: 940
- FIPS code: 48-55056
- GNIS feature ID: 2411368

Paradise is a city in Wise County, Texas, United States. The population was 475 in 2020.

== History ==
Paradise was established in 1873 under the name Eldorado. The name was changed to Paradise Prairie in 1876 when the post office opened, as there was already an Eldorado, Texas. The name Paradise Prairie was chosen due to the wildflowers that grew in the area, though local folklore claims that it got its name because the area was a "paradise" for cowboys who would herd their cattle to Kansas for market.

Paradise was moved a mile to the northeast in 1893 to be closer to the newly constructed Rock Island Railroad. The new post office dropped "Prairie" from its name.

Paradise was officially incorporated in 1996, having previously been an unincorporated community.

== Geography ==
According to the United States Census Bureau, the city has a total area of 2.0 square miles (5.2 km^{2}), all land.

== Demographics ==
Historical population
Census	Pop.	Note	%±
2000	459		—
2010	441		−3.9%
2020	475		7.7%
2023 (est.)	701		47.6%
U.S. Decennial Census

=== 2020 census ===
As of the 2020 census, there were 475 people, 190 households, and 125 families residing in Paradise, and the DP1 profile detailed 185 households described below; the median age was 38.5 years, 25.1% of residents were under the age of 18, 16.8% were 65 years of age or older, and there were 94.7 males per 100 females (93.5 males per 100 females age 18 and over).

As of the 2020 census, 0.0% of residents lived in urban areas while 100.0% lived in rural areas.

There were 185 households in Paradise, of which 34.1% had children under the age of 18 living in them, 47.6% were married-couple households, 20.5% were households with a male householder and no spouse or partner present, and 24.3% were households with a female householder and no spouse or partner present; about 28.1% of all households were made up of individuals and 13.5% had someone living alone who was 65 years of age or older.

There were 221 housing units, of which 16.3% were vacant; the homeowner vacancy rate was 6.6% and the rental vacancy rate was 8.3%.

Racial composition as of the 2020 census (Note: Note: the US Census treats Hispanic/Latino as an ethnic category and assigns Hispanics/Latinos to a separate category.)
Race	Number	Percent
White	436	91.8%
Black or African American	4	0.8%
American Indian and Alaska Native	2	0.4%
Asian	2	0.4%
Native Hawaiian and Other Pacific Islander	0	0.0%
Some other race	3	0.6%
Two or more races	28	5.9%
Hispanic or Latino (of any race)	53	11.2%

== Education ==
The City of Paradise is served by the Paradise Independent School District.
