= Granville, West Virginia =

- Town
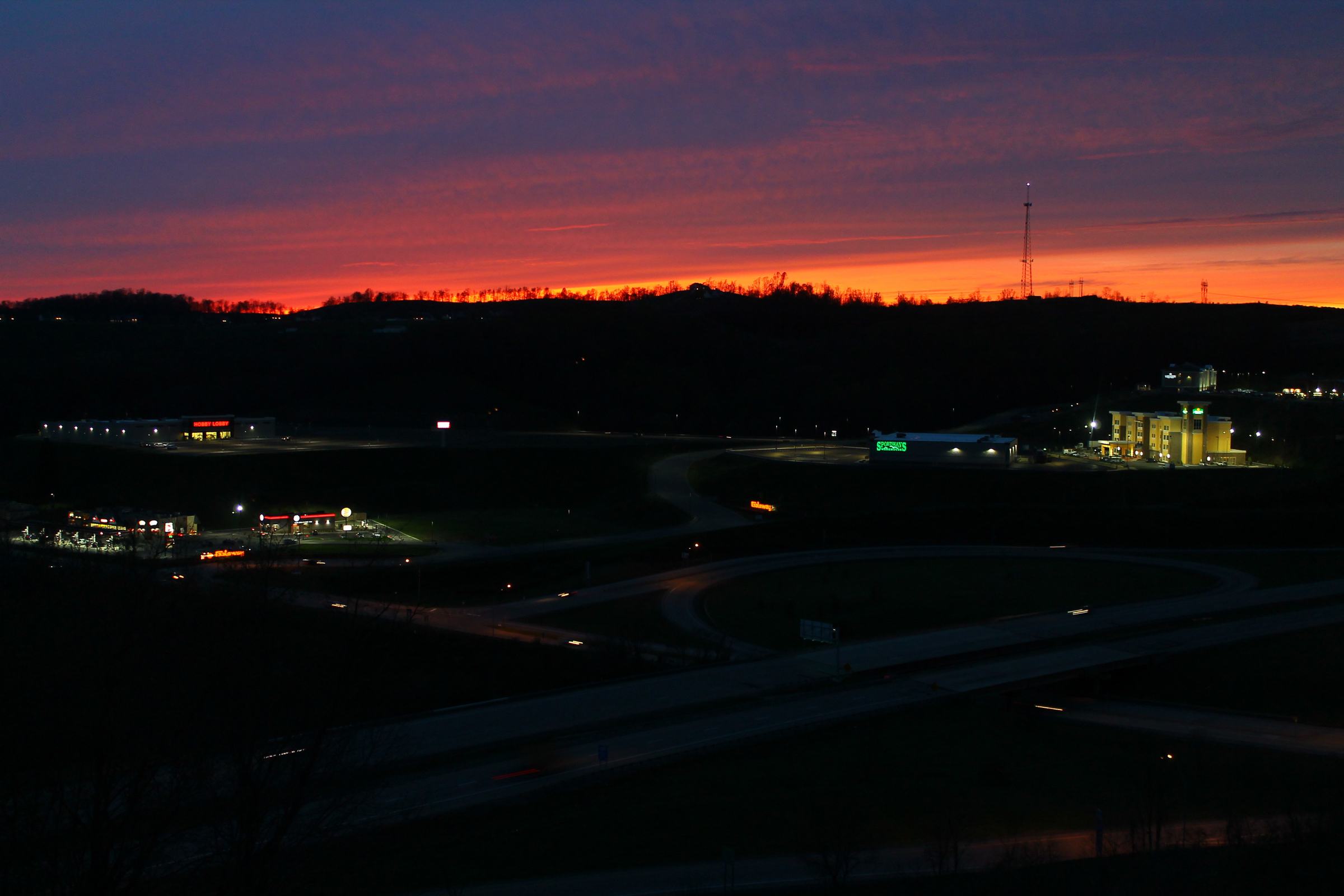
- Sunset in April 2017

- Seal Logo

- Location of Granville in Monongalia County, West Virginia.
- Coordinates: 39°38′36″N 79°59′17″W
- Country: United States
- State: West Virginia
- County: Monongalia

Government
  - Mayor: Patricia Lewis

Area
  - Total: 1.30 sq mi (3.36 km^{2})
  - Land: 1.30 sq mi (3.36 km^{2})
  - Water: 0 sq mi (0.00 km^{2})
- Elevation: 814 ft (248 m)

Population (2020)
  - Total: 1,355
  - Estimate (2021): 1,390
  - Density: 2,420.5/sq mi (934.55/km^{2})
- Time zone: UTC-5 (Eastern (EST))
  - Summer (DST): UTC-4 (EDT)
- ZIP code: 26534
- Area code: 304
- FIPS code: 54-32932
- GNIS feature ID: 1539594
- Website: townofgranvillewv.gov

Granville is a town in Monongalia County, West Virginia, United States. The population was 1,355 at the 2020 census. It is included in the Morgantown metropolitan area.

== History ==
Granville was originally called Grandville, after a nearby river island.

== Geography ==
Granville is located at 39°38′36″N 79°59′17″W (39.643426, -79.988054).

According to the United States Census Bureau, the town has a total area of 1.30 square miles (3.37 km^{2}), all land.

== Demographics ==
Historical population
Census	Pop.	Note	%±
1880	122		—
1950	1,004		—
1960	806		−19.7%
1970	971		20.5%
1980	992		2.2%
1990	791		−20.3%
2000	778		−1.6%
2010	781		0.4%
2020	1,355		73.5%
2021 (est.)	1,390	▲	2.6%
U.S. Decennial Census

=== 2010 census ===
As of the census of 2010, there were 781 people, 356 households, and 195 families living in the town. The population density was 600.8 inhabitants per square mile (232.0/km^{2}). There were 394 housing units at an average density of 303.1 units per square mile (117.0 units/km^{2}). The racial makeup of the town was 95.3% White, 1.9% African American, 0.1% Asian, and 2.7% from two or more races. Hispanic or Latino of any race were 1.3% of the population.

There were 356 households, of which 27.2% had children under the age of 18 living with them, 33.4% were married couples living together, 17.1% had a female householder with no husband present, 4.2% had a male householder with no wife present, and 45.2% were non-families. 36.8% of all households were made up of individuals, and 14.4% had someone living alone who was 65 years of age or older. The average household size was 2.19 and the average family size was 2.88.

The median age in the town was 40.8 years. 20% of residents were under the age of 18; 9.1% were between the ages of 18 and 24; 26.6% were from 25 to 44; 28.9% were from 45 to 64; and 15.4% were 65 years of age or older. The gender makeup of the town was 46.2% male and 53.8% female.

=== 2000 census ===
As of the census of 2000, there were 778 people, 362 households, and 201 families living in the town. The population density was 592.2 inhabitants per square mile (228.6 inhabitants/km^{2}). There were 430 housing units at an average density of 327.3 units per square mile (126.4 units/km^{2}). The racial makeup of the town was 95.89% White, 2.06% African American, 0.51% Native American, 0.39% Asian, and 1.16% from two or more races. Hispanic or Latino of any race were 0.51% of the population.

There were 362 households, out of which 24.0% had children under the age of 18 living with them, 34.0% were married couples living together, 18.2% had a female householder with no husband present, and 44.2% were non-families. 37.6% of all households were made up of individuals, and 16.3% had someone living alone who was 65 years of age or older. The average household size was 2.15 and the average family size was 2.81.

In the town, the population was spread out, with 20.7% under the age of 18, 10.2% from 18 to 24, 30.2% from 25 to 44, 23.5% from 45 to 64, and 15.4% who were 65 years of age or older. The median age was 36 years. For every 100 females, there were 82.2 males. For every 100 females age 18 and over, there were 78.3 males.

The median income for a household in the town was $22,583, and the median income for a family was $26,806. Males had a median income of $21,250 versus $17,212 for females. The per capita income for the town was $12,958. About 25.4% of families and 27.7% of the population were below the poverty line, including 43.4% of those under age 18 and 8.7% of those age 65 or over.

== Notable person ==
- Marmaduke H. Dent, lawyer, politician, and former justice of the West Virginia Supreme Court of Appeals

== Climate ==
The climate in this area has mild differences between highs and lows, and there is adequate rainfall year-round. According to the Köppen Climate Classification system, Granville has a subtropical highland climate, abbreviated "Cfb" on climate maps.
