= Kimrey Family Stadium =

US university baseball field

Coordinates: 35.190392°N 97.446835°W

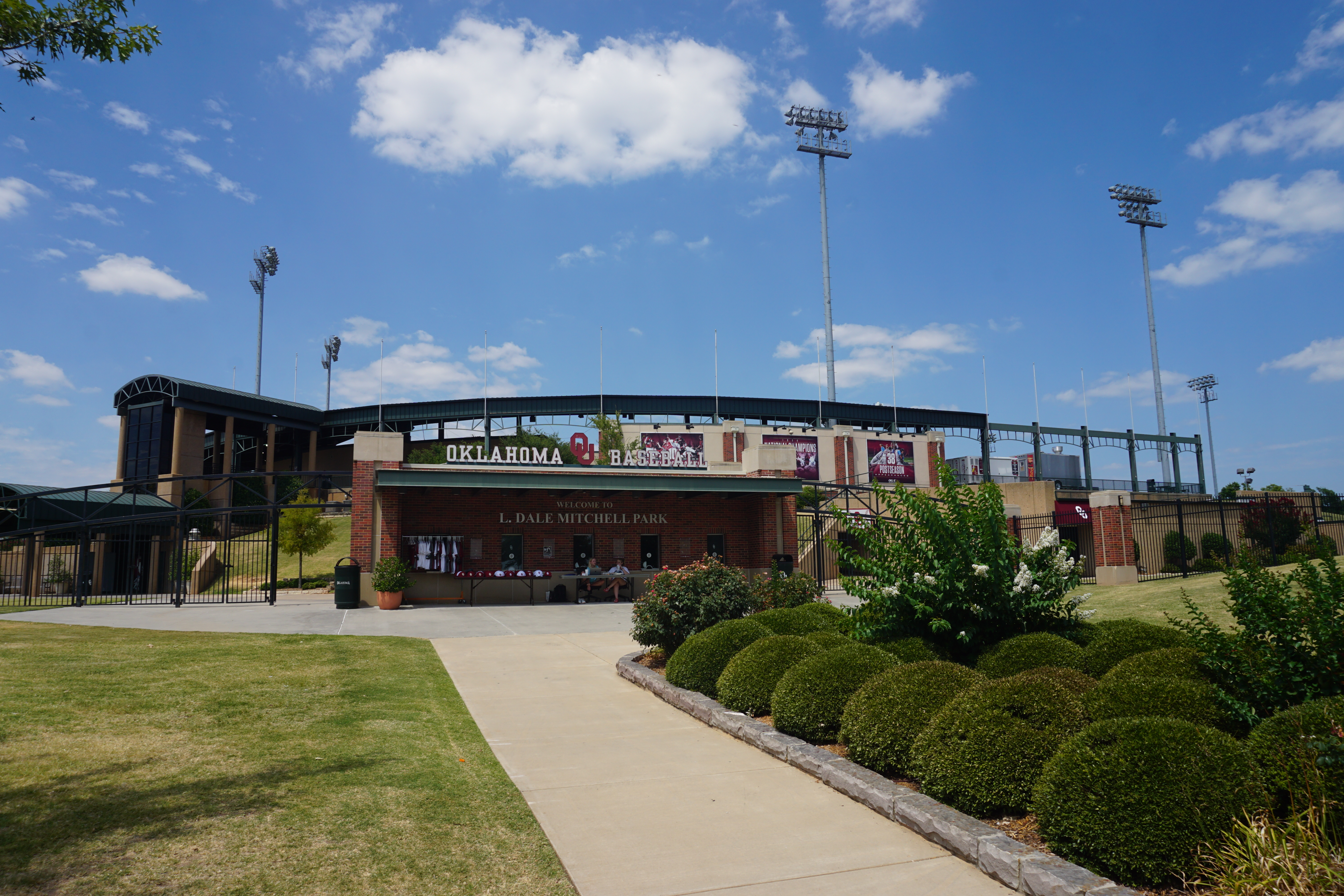
- Interactive map of Kimrey Family Stadium
- Former names: L. Dale Mitchell Baseball Park (1982–2025)
- Location: Norman, Oklahoma
- Owner: University of Oklahoma
- Operator: University of Oklahoma
- Capacity: 3,180
- Surface: Astro Turf
- Field size: Left field - 335 ft Center field - 411 ft Right field - 335 ft

Construction
- Opened: 1982
- Cost: $1.27 million

Tenant
- Oklahoma Sooners (NCAA) (1982–present)

Kimrey Family Stadium, formerly known as L. Dale Mitchell Baseball Park, is a baseball stadium on the campus of the University of Oklahoma in Norman, Oklahoma. It is the ballpark of the Oklahoma Sooners baseball team, which is an NCAA Division I baseball program that plays in the Southeastern Conference (SEC). It opened in 1982.

== About ==
Kimrey Family Stadium is named for OU donors Brian and Kim Kimrey. The park was previously named L. Dale Mitchell Baseball Park, for Dale Mitchell, a mid-1940s Sooner letterman who holds OU's career and single-season batting records. The park was originally constructed at a cost of $1.27 million and was dedicated in 1982.

== Renovations ==
Renovations during the 1998 season included an upper concourse plus additional rest rooms and concession stands. The locker room, training room and equipment room were also updated. Prior to the 2002 season, the press box and broadcast booths were significantly expanded and an elevator and VIP suites were added.

OU added a practice facility prior to the 2009 season including a regulation-size natural grass infield and a 5,160 square-foot indoor hitting facility. The building contains three full-size pitching and hitting lanes and is heated and air conditioned. The addition covered 22,500 square feet of existing ground down the left-field line adjacent to the Sooner bullpen.

The ballpark received a new video and scoreboard in left field in 2009, and new chair back seats were added prior to the 2011 and 2012 seasons. Also in 2012, a new warning track was installed as well as field turf in the foul territory around the infield.

As of 2026, the stadium is undergoing a $45 million renovation, that is expected to be completed by the beginning of the 2028 season.

== See also ==
- List of NCAA Division I baseball venues
