= 2016 NCAA Division I baseball season =

Baseball season

- Duration: February 19, 2016 – June 30, 2016
- Number of teams: 300
- Preseason No. 1: Florida (Unanimous)
- Defending champions: Virginia

Tournament
- Duration: June 3 – June 30, 2016
- Most conference bids: ACC (10)

College World Series
- Champions: Coastal Carolina (1st title)
- Runners-up: Arizona (16th CWS Appearance)
- Winning coach: Gary Gilmore (1st title)
- MOP: Andrew Beckwith (Coastal Carolina)

Seasons
- ← 2015 2017 →

The 2016 NCAA Division I baseball season, play of college baseball in the United States organized by the National Collegiate Athletic Association (NCAA) at the Division I level, began in February 2016. The season progressed through the regular season, many conference tournaments and championship series, and concluded with the 2016 NCAA Division I baseball tournament and 2016 College World Series. The College World Series, consisting of the eight remaining teams in the NCAA tournament and held annually in Omaha, Nebraska, at TD Ameritrade Park Omaha, ended on June 30, 2016, with Coastal Carolina claiming its first NCAA title in a team sport.

== Realignment ==
- Northern Kentucky left the Atlantic Sun Conference for the Horizon League.
- NJIT joined the Atlantic Sun, leaving the ranks of Independents.
- The merger of the University of Texas–Pan American and the University of Texas at Brownsville, formally announced in 2013, took full effect with the 2015–16 school year, creating the new Texas–Rio Grande Valley. The new institution retained Texas–Pan American's membership in the Western Athletic Conference.
- Akron, of the Mid-American Conference, discontinued its program.

== Season outlook ==
Collegiate Baseball News
Ranking	Team
1	Florida
2	Louisville
3	Vanderbilt
4	Miami (FL)
5	Texas A&M
6	Louisiana–Lafayette
7	LSU
8	Oregon State
9	Virginia
10	UCLA
11	Mississippi State
12	Cal State Fullerton
13	California
14	Oregon
15	TCU
16	Florida State
17	Missouri State
18	Houston
19	Tulane
20	Rice
21	Georgia Tech
22	North Carolina
23	Michigan
24	Arkansas
25	Oklahoma State

Baseball America
Ranking	Team
1	Florida
2	Louisville
3	Texas A&M
4	Virginia
5	Oregon State
6	Miami (FL)
7	Vanderbilt
8	California
9	Oklahoma State
10	UCLA
11	LSU
12	Houston
13	Louisiana–Lafayette
14	Oregon
15	Michigan
16	Southern California
17	Florida State
18	TCU
19	NC State
20	Mississippi State
21	Oklahoma
22	Cal State Fullerton
23	Coastal Carolina
24	Ole Miss
25	Kentucky

Coaches
Ranking	Team
1	Florida 21
2	Louisville 2
3	Vanderbilt 3
4	Texas A&M 1
5	LSU 1
6	Miami (FL)
7	Virginia 3
8	Oregon State
9	UCLA
10	Oklahoma State
11	TCU
12	California
13	Louisiana–Lafayette
14	Florida State
15	Oregon
16	Cal State Fullerton
17	Mississippi State
18	Houston
19	NC State
20	North Carolina
21	Southern California
22	Arkansas
23	South Carolina
24	Rice
25	Missouri State

NCBWA
Ranking	Team
1	Florida
2	Louisville
3	Vanderbilt
4	Texas A&M
5	Oregon State
6	Miami (FL)
7	LSU
8	Virginia
9	UCLA
10	California
11	Oklahoma State
12	TCU
13	Louisiana–Lafayette
14	Florida State
15	Houston
16	Cal State Fullerton
17	Oregon
18	Southern California
19	Mississippi State
20	NC State
21	North Carolina
22	Arkansas
23	Coastal Carolina
24	South Carolina
25	Michigan

== Conference standings ==
2016 American Athletic Conference baseball standings
	Conf.						Overall
Team	W		L		T	PCT	W		L		T	PCT
No. 25 Tulane ‍†‍‍^{y}	15	–	7	–	0	.682	39	–	19	–	0	.672
No. 15 East Carolina ‍‍‍^{y}	15	–	8	–	1	.646	34	–	21	–	1	.616
Connecticut ‍‍‡‍^{y}	14	–	9	–	0	.609	37	–	23	–	0	.617
Cincinnati ‍‍‍	13	–	10	–	1	.563	26	–	30	–	1	.465
Houston ‍‍‍	11	–	12	–	0	.478	36	–	23	–	0	.610
Memphis ‍‍‍	9	–	15	–	0	.375	22	–	39	–	0	.361
South Florida ‍‍‍	8	–	16	–	0	.333	24	–	33	–	0	.421
UCF ‍‍‍	8	–	16	–	0	.333	26	–	33	–	0	.441
† – Conference champion ‡ – Tournament champion y – Invited to the NCAA tournament As of June 2, 2016; Rankings from Collegiate Baseball

2016 Atlantic 10 Conference baseball standings
	Conf.						Overall
Team	W		L		T	PCT	W		L		T	PCT
Rhode Island ‍†‍‡‍^{y}	18	–	6	–	0	.750	31	–	25	–	0	.554
VCU ‍‍‍	15	–	7	–	0	.682	38	–	19	–	0	.667
Saint Joseph's ‍‍‍	15	–	9	–	0	.625	31	–	23	–	0	.574
Saint Louis ‍‍‍	15	–	9	–	0	.625	25	–	31	–	0	.446
Fordham ‍‍‍	14	–	10	–	0	.583	29	–	29	–	0	.500
Davidson ‍‍‍	11	–	11	–	0	.500	28	–	26	–	0	.519
George Washington ‍‍‍	12	–	12	–	0	.500	24	–	33	–	0	.421
UMass ‍‍‍	11	–	13	–	0	.458	18	–	27	–	0	.400
St. Bonaventure ‍‍‍	11	–	13	–	0	.458	26	–	22	–	1	.541
Richmond ‍‍‍	11	–	13	–	0	.458	28	–	24	–	0	.538
Dayton ‍‍‍	8	–	16	–	0	.333	19	–	36	–	0	.345
George Mason ‍‍‍	7	–	17	–	0	.292	19	–	35	–	0	.352
La Salle ‍‍‍	6	–	18	–	0	.250	15	–	39	–	0	.278
† – Conference champion ‡ – Tournament champion y – Invited to the NCAA tournament As of June 4, 2016; Rankings from Collegiate Baseball

2016 Atlantic Coast Conference baseball standings
	Conf.				Overall
Team	W		L	PCT	W		L	PCT
Atlantic
No. 11 Louisville ^{x}‍‍‍^{y}	22	–	8	.733	48	–	12	.800
No. 14 Florida State ‍‍‍^{y}	16	–	10	.615	38	–	20	.655
No. 20 NC State ‍‍‍^{y}	15	–	13	.536	36	–	20	.643
No. 18 Clemson ‍‍‡‍^{y}	16	–	14	.533	43	–	18	.705
No. 16 Boston College ‍‍‍^{y}	13	–	15	.464	35	–	22	.614
Wake Forest ‍‍‍^{y}	13	–	17	.433	35	–	25	.583
Notre Dame ‍‍‍	11	–	17	.393	27	–	27	.500
Coastal
No. 8 Miami (FL) ^{x}‍‍‍^{y}	21	–	7	.750	46	–	11	.807
No. 17 Virginia ‍‍‍^{y}	19	–	11	.633	38	–	20	.655
Duke ‍‍‍^{y}	14	–	15	.483	33	–	23	.589
Georgia Tech ‍‍‍^{y}	13	–	16	.448	36	–	24	.600
North Carolina ‍‍‍	13	–	17	.433	34	–	21	.618
Pittsburgh ‍‍‍	10	–	18	.357	25	–	26	.490
Virginia Tech ‍‍‍	6	–	24	.200	19	–	36	.345
x – Division champion ‡ – Tournament champion y – Invited to the NCAA tournament As of June 4, 2016; Rankings from Collegiate Baseball

2016 Atlantic Sun Conference baseball standings
	Conf.				Overall
Team	W		L	PCT	W		L	PCT
Kennesaw State ‍†‍‍	17	–	4	.810	29	–	27	.518
North Florida ‍‍‍	15	–	6	.714	39	–	19	.672
Jacksonville ‍‍‍	14	–	7	.667	33	–	22	.600
Lipscomb ‍‍‍	12	–	9	.571	31	–	27	.534
Stetson ‍‍‡‍^{y}	9	–	12	.429	29	–	31	.483
Florida Gulf Coast ‍‍‍	9	–	12	.429	27	–	32	.458
USC Upstate ‍‍‍	5	–	15	.250	22	–	30	.423
NJIT ‍‍‍	2	–	18	.100	17	–	36	.321
† – Conference champion ‡ – Tournament champion y – Invited to the NCAA tournament As of June 30, 2016; Rankings from Collegiate Baseball

2016 Big 12 Conference baseball standings
	Conf.						Overall
Team	W		L		T	PCT	W		L		T	PCT
No. 5 Texas Tech ‍†‍‍^{y}	19	–	5	–	0	.792	47	–	20	–	0	.701
No. 4 Oklahoma State ‍‍‍^{y}	16	–	8	–	0	.667	43	–	22	–	0	.662
No. 3 TCU ‍‍‡‍^{y}	15	–	9	–	0	.625	49	–	18	–	0	.731
West Virginia ‍‍‍	12	–	11	–	0	.522	36	–	22	–	0	.621
Oklahoma ‍‍‍	11	–	13	–	0	.458	30	–	27	–	1	.526
Baylor ‍‍‍	10	–	14	–	0	.417	24	–	29	–	0	.453
Texas ‍‍‍	10	–	14	–	0	.417	25	–	32	–	0	.439
Kansas State ‍‍‍	8	–	16	–	0	.333	26	–	31	–	0	.456
Kansas ‍‍‍	6	–	17	–	0	.261	20	–	35	–	1	.366
† – Conference champion ‡ – Tournament champion y – Invited to the NCAA tournament Rankings from Collegiate Baseball

2016 Big East Conference baseball standings
	Conf.						Overall
Team	W		L		T	PCT	W		L		T	PCT
No. 21 Xavier ‍†‍‡‍^{y}	14	–	4	–	0	.778	30	–	28	–	0	.517
Creighton ‍‍‍	13	–	5	–	0	.722	38	–	17	–	0	.691
Seton Hall ‍‍‍	10	–	8	–	0	.556	38	–	20	–	0	.655
St. John's ‍‍‍	9	–	9	–	0	.500	28	–	26	–	1	.518
Georgetown ‍‍‍	8	–	10	–	0	.444	25	–	29	–	0	.463
Villanova ‍‍‍	5	–	13	–	0	.278	20	–	32	–	0	.385
Butler ‍‍‍	4	–	14	–	0	.222	14	–	40	–	0	.259
† – Conference champion ‡ – Tournament champion y – Invited to the NCAA tournament As of June 4, 2016; Rankings from Collegiate Baseball

2016 Big South Conference baseball standings
	Conf.				Overall
Team	W		L	PCT	W		L	PCT
#1 Coastal Carolina †‡^{y} ‍‍‍	21	–	3	.875	53	–	17	.757
High Point ‍‍‍	14	–	10	.583	32	–	24	.571
Longwood ‍‍‍	14	–	10	.583	32	–	27	.542
Gardner–Webb ‍‍‍	14	–	10	.583	37	–	21	.638
Campbell* ‍‍‍	13	–	11	.542	26	–	27	.491
Presbyterian ‍‍‍	12	–	12	.500	27	–	30	.474
Liberty ‍‍‍	12	–	12	.500	31	–	28	.525
Winthrop ‍‍‍	12	–	12	.500	28	–	27	.509
Radford ‍‍‍	9	–	15	.375	19	–	39	.328
Charleston Southern ‍‍‍	6	–	18	.250	19	–	34	.358
UNC Asheville ‍‍‍	5	–	19	.208	16	–	38	.296
† – Conference champion ‡ – Tournament champion y – Invited to the NCAA tournament *Ineligible for postseason play due to APR penalties As of June 5, 2016; Rankings from Collegiate Baseball

2016 Big Ten Conference baseball standings
	Conf.						Overall
Team	W		L		T	PCT	W		L		T	PCT
Minnesota ‍†‍‍^{y}	16	–	7	–	0	.696	35	–	21	–	0	.625
Nebraska ‍‍‍^{y}	16	–	8	–	0	.667	37	–	22	–	0	.627
Ohio St. ‍‍‡‍^{y}	15	–	9	–	0	.625	44	–	20	–	1	.685
Indiana ‍‍‍	15	–	9	–	0	.625	32	–	24	–	0	.571
Michigan ‍‍‍	13	–	10	–	0	.565	36	–	21	–	0	.632
Michigan State ‍‍‍	13	–	11	–	0	.542	36	–	20	–	0	.643
Maryland ‍‍‍	13	–	11	–	0	.542	30	–	27	–	0	.526
Illinois ‍‍‍	12	–	12	–	0	.500	28	–	23	–	0	.549
Iowa ‍‍‍	12	–	12	–	0	.500	30	–	26	–	0	.536
Penn State ‍‍‍	12	–	12	–	0	.500	28	–	27	–	0	.509
Rutgers ‍‍‍	9	–	15	–	0	.375	27	–	28	–	0	.491
Northwestern ‍‍‍	7	–	17	–	0	.292	15	–	39	–	0	.278
Purdue ‍‍‍	2	–	22	–	0	.083	10	–	44	–	0	.185
† – Conference champion ‡ – Tournament champion y – Invited to the NCAA tournament As of June 5, 2016; Rankings from Collegiate Baseball

2016 Big West Conference baseball standings
	Conf.						Overall
Team	W		L		T	PCT	W		L		T	PCT
#28 Cal State Fullerton †^{y} ‍‍‍	17	–	7	–	0	.708	36	–	22	–	0	.621
Long Beach State ‍‍‍^{y}	15	–	9	–	0	.625	37	–	21	–	0	.638
No. 6 UC Santa Barbara ‍‍‍^{y}	13	–	11	–	0	.542	38	–	18	–	1	.675
Cal Poly ‍‍‍	12	–	12	–	0	.500	32	–	25	–	0	.561
Hawaii ‍‍‍	12	–	12	–	0	.500	23	–	30	–	0	.434
UC Riverside ‍‍‍	12	–	12	–	0	.500	26	–	29	–	0	.473
UC Irvine ‍‍‍	11	–	13	–	0	.458	31	–	25	–	0	.554
Cal State Northridge ‍‍‍	11	–	13	–	0	.458	33	–	22	–	0	.600
UC Davis ‍‍‍	5	–	19	–	0	.208	17	–	36	–	0	.321
† – Conference champion y – Invited to the NCAA tournament As of June 5, 2016; Rankings from Collegiate Baseball

2016 Colonial Athletic Association baseball standings
	Conf.						Overall
Team	W		L		T	PCT	W		L		T	PCT
UNC Wilmington ‍†‍‍^{y}	16	–	6	–	0	.727	41	–	19	–	0	.683
William & Mary ‍‍‡‍^{y}	14	–	9	–	0	.609	31	–	31	–	0	.500
Elon ‍‍‍	13	–	10	–	0	.565	25	–	29	–	0	.463
James Madison ‍‍‍	13	–	11	–	0	.542	24	–	31	–	0	.436
Northeastern ‍‍‍	12	–	11	–	0	.522	31	–	27	–	0	.534
College of Charleston ‍‍‍	12	–	12	–	0	.500	31	–	26	–	1	.543
Delaware ‍‍‍	10	–	14	–	0	.417	32	–	22	–	0	.593
Towson ‍‍‍	10	–	14	–	0	.417	20	–	35	–	0	.364
Hofstra ‍‍‍	5	–	18	–	0	.217	15	–	37	–	0	.288
† – Conference champion ‡ – Tournament champion y – Invited to the NCAA tournament As of June 20, 2016; Rankings from Collegiate Baseball

2016 Conference USA baseball standings
	Conf.				Overall
Team	W		L	PCT	W		L	PCT
Florida Atlantic ‍†‍‍^{y}	21	–	8	.724	39	–	18	.684
Marshall ‍‍‍	21	–	9	.700	34	–	21	.618
No. 27 Southern Miss ‍‍‡‍^{y}	20	–	10	.667	41	–	19	.683
No. 30 Rice ‍‍‍^{y}	19	–	10	.655	38	–	24	.613
Louisiana Tech ‍‍‍^{y}	19	–	11	.633	41	–	19	.683
Old Dominion ‍‍‍	15	–	15	.500	32	–	24	.571
FIU ‍‍‍	15	–	15	.500	29	–	29	.500
Charlotte ‍‍‍	12	–	17	.414	23	–	32	.418
UAB ‍‍‍	12	–	18	.400	21	–	34	.382
Western Kentucky ‍‍‍	10	–	20	.333	24	–	30	.444
UTSA ‍‍‍	8	–	20	.286	17	–	34	.333
Middle Tennessee ‍‍‍	5	–	24	.172	20	–	35	.364
† – Conference champion ‡ – Tournament champion y – Invited to the NCAA tournament As of June 5, 2016; Rankings from Collegiate Baseball

2016 Horizon League baseball standings
	Conf.				Overall
Team	W		L	PCT	W		L	PCT
Wright State ‍†‍‡‍^{y}	23	–	6	.793	45	–	16	.738
Milwaukee ‍‍‍	17	–	11	.607	32	–	26	.552
Valparaiso ‍‍‍	17	–	12	.586	30	–	28	.517
UIC ‍‍‍	15	–	12	.556	25	–	30	.455
Oakland ‍‍‍	11	–	14	.440	23	–	27	.460
Northern Kentucky ‍‍‍	9	–	21	.300	20	–	34	.370
Youngstown State ‍‍‍	5	–	21	.192	14	–	38	.269
† – Conference champion ‡ – Tournament champion y – Invited to the NCAA tournament As of June 4, 2016; Rankings from Collegiate Baseball

2016 Ivy League baseball standings
	Conf.						Overall
Team	W		L		T	PCT	W		L		T	PCT
Lou Gehrig
Princeton ^{x}‍‍‡‍^{y}	13	–	7	–	0	.650	24	–	21	–	0	.533
Penn ‍‍‍	10	–	10	–	0	.500	19	–	22	–	0	.463
Columbia ‍‍‍	10	–	10	–	0	.500	17	–	24	–	0	.415
Cornell ‍‍‍	7	–	13	–	0	.350	14	–	24	–	0	.368
Red Rolfe
Dartmouth ^{x}‍‍‍	11	–	9	–	0	.550	18	–	25	–	0	.419
Yale ^{x}‍‍‍	11	–	9	–	0	.550	19	–	28	–	1	.406
Harvard ‍‍‍	9	–	11	–	0	.450	17	–	24	–	0	.415
Brown ‍‍‍	9	–	11	–	0	.450	15	–	24	–	0	.385
x – Division champion ‡ – Championship Series champion y – Invited to the NCAA tournament As of June 5, 2016; Rankings from Collegiate Baseball

2016 Mid-American Conference baseball standings
	Conf.						Overall
Team	W		L		T	PCT	W		L		T	PCT
East Division
Kent State ^{x}‍‍‍	20	–	4	–	0	.833	44	–	14	–	0	.759
Miami (OH) ‍‍‍	14	–	10	–	0	.583	27	–	29	–	0	.482
Ohio ‍‍‍	8	–	16	–	0	.333	23	–	29	–	0	.442
Buffalo ‍‍‍	8	–	16	–	0	.333	21	–	31	–	0	.404
Bowling Green ‍‍‍	7	–	17	–	0	.292	17	–	37	–	0	.315
West Division
Ball State ^{x}‍‍‍	15	–	9	–	0	.625	32	–	26	–	0	.552
Northern Illinois ‍‍‍	14	–	10	–	0	.583	24	–	32	–	0	.429
Toledo ‍‍‍	13	–	11	–	0	.542	19	–	38	–	1	.336
Central Michigan ‍‍‍	12	–	12	–	0	.500	24	–	37	–	0	.393
Western Michigan ‡^{y} ‍‍‍	11	–	13	–	0	.458	22	–	34	–	0	.393
Eastern Michigan ‍‍‍	10	–	14	–	0	.417	23	–	36	–	0	.390
x – Division champion ‡ – Tournament champion y – Invited to the NCAA tournament As of June 11, 2016; Rankings from Collegiate Baseball

2016 Mid-Eastern Athletic Conference baseball standings
	Conf.				Overall
Team	W		L	PCT	W		L	PCT
Northern
Norfolk State ^{x}‍‍‍	19	–	5	.792	29	–	21	.580
Delaware State ‍‍‍	13	–	10	.565	13	–	37	.260
Coppin State ‍‍‍	8	–	16	.333	14	–	38	.269
Maryland Eastern Shore ‍‍‍	7	–	16	.304	16	–	32	.333
Southern
Florida A&M ^{x}‍‍‍	19	–	5	.792	31	–	21	.596
Bethune–Cookman ‍‍‡‍^{y}	17	–	7	.708	29	–	27	.518
North Carolina Central ‍‍‍	11	–	13	.458	25	–	30	.455
Savannah State ‍‍‍	7	–	17	.292	12	–	40	.231
North Carolina A&T ‍‍‍	6	–	18	.250	13	–	41	.241
‡ – Tournament champion y – Invited to the NCAA tournament As of June 11, 2016; Rankings from Collegiate Baseball

2016 Missouri Valley Conference baseball standings
	Conf.						Overall
Team	W		L		T	PCT	W		L		T	PCT
#24 Dallas Baptist ‡^{y} ‍‍‍	15	–	5	–	0	.750	44	–	19	–	0	.698
Indiana State ‍‍‍	13	–	8	–	0	.619	35	–	21	–	0	.625
Bradley ‍‍‍	11	–	9	–	0	.550	29	–	21	–	0	.580
Southern Illinois ‍‍‍	11	–	10	–	0	.524	31	–	25	–	1	.553
Evansville ‍‍‍	9	–	12	–	0	.429	29	–	27	–	0	.518
Wichita State ‍‍‍	9	–	12	–	0	.429	21	–	37	–	0	.362
Missouri State ‍‍‍	7	–	13	–	0	.350	38	–	21	–	0	.644
Illinois State ‍‍‍	7	–	13	–	0	.350	17	–	37	–	0	.315
‡ – Tournament champion y – Invited to the NCAA tournament As of June 11, 2016; Rankings from Collegiate Baseball

2016 Mountain West Conference baseball standings
	Conf.				Overall
Team	W		L	PCT	W		L	PCT
Fresno State ‍†‍‍	21	–	9	.700	36	–	22	.621
New Mexico ‍‍‡‍^{y}	20	–	10	.667	37	–	24	.607
Nevada ‍‍‍	20	–	10	.667	39	–	23	.629
UNLV ‍‍‍	14	–	16	.467	24	–	32	.429
Air Force ‍‍‍	12	–	18	.400	30	–	27	.526
San Diego State ‍‍‍	11	–	19	.367	21	–	38	.356
San Jose State ‍‍‍	7	–	23	.233	17	–	39	.304
† – Conference champion ‡ – Tournament champion y – Invited to the NCAA tournament As of June 11, 2016; Rankings from Collegiate Baseball

2016 NCAA Division I baseball independents standings
	Conf.				Overall
Team	W		L	PCT	W		L	PCT
NYIT ‍‍‍		–		–	17	–	26	.395
As of June 5, 2016; Rankings from Collegiate Baseball

2016 Ohio Valley Conference baseball standings
	Conf.				Overall
Team	W		L	PCT	W		L	PCT
Southeast Missouri State †‡^{y} ‍‍‍	22	–	8	.733	36	–	18	.667
Austin Peay ‍‍‍	21	–	9	.700	34	–	22	.607
Jacksonville State ‍‍‍	20	–	10	.667	33	–	22	.600
Morehead State ‍‍‍	17	–	13	.567	32	–	27	.542
Belmont ‍‍‍	17	–	13	.567	33	–	27	.550
Tennessee Tech ‍‍‍	17	–	13	.567	31	–	24	.564
Murray State ‍‍‍	15	–	15	.500	27	–	29	.482
Eastern Kentucky ‍‍‍	13	–	17	.433	24	–	31	.436
Tennessee–Martin ‍‍‍	9	–	21	.300	19	–	35	.352
Eastern Illinois ‍‍‍	8	–	22	.267	15	–	39	.278
SIU Edwardsvills ‍‍‍	6	–	24	.200	9	–	40	.184
† – Conference champion ‡ – Tournament champion y – Invited to the NCAA tournament As of June 11, 2016; Rankings from Collegiate Baseball

2016 Pac-12 Conference baseball standings
	Conf.				Overall
Team	W		L	PCT	W		L	PCT
Utah ‍†‍‍^{y}	19	–	11	.633	26	–	29	.473
No. 22 Washington ‍‍‍^{y}	17	–	13	.567	33	–	23	.589
No. 29 Arizona State ‍‍‍^{y}	16	–	14	.533	36	–	23	.610
No. 2 Arizona ‍‍‍^{y}	17	–	15	.531	49	–	23	.681
Oregon State ‍‍‍	16	–	14	.533	35	–	19	.648
Southern California ‍‍‍	15	–	15	.500	28	–	28	.500
Stanford ‍‍‍	15	–	15	.500	31	–	23	.574
California ‍‍‍	14	–	16	.467	32	–	21	.604
Oregon ‍‍‍	14	–	16	.467	29	–	26	.527
UCLA ‍‍‍	12	–	18	.400	25	–	31	.446
Washington State ‍‍‍	11	–	19	.367	19	–	35	.352
† – Conference champion y – Invited to the NCAA tournament As of June 11, 2016; Rankings from Collegiate Baseball

2016 Patriot League baseball standings
	Conf.						Overall
Team	W		L		T	PCT	W		L		T	PCT
Navy ‍†‍‡‍^{y}	15	–	5	–	0	.750	43	–	16	–	1	.725
Holy Cross ‍‍‍	14	–	6	–	0	.700	30	–	27	–	0	.526
Lehigh ‍‍‍	9	–	10	–	0	.474	25	–	29	–	0	.463
Bucknell ‍‍‍	8	–	12	–	0	.400	18	–	34	–	0	.346
Lafayette ‍‍‍	7	–	13	–	0	.350	14	–	29	–	0	.326
Army ‍‍‍	6	–	13	–	0	.316	16	–	32	–	0	.333
‡ – Tournament champion y – Invited to the NCAA tournament As of June 11, 2016; Rankings from Collegiate Baseball

2016 Southeastern Conference baseball standings
	Conf.						Overall
Team	W		L		T	PCT	W		L		T	PCT
Eastern
No. 12 South Carolina ^{x}‍‍‍^{y}	20	–	9	–	0	.690	46	–	18	–	0	.719
No. 7 Florida ‍‍‍^{y}	19	–	10	–	0	.655	52	–	16	–	0	.765
No. 23 Vanderbilt ‍‍‍^{y}	18	–	12	–	0	.600	43	–	19	–	0	.694
Kentucky ‍‍‍	15	–	15	–	0	.500	32	–	25	–	0	.561
Georgia ‍‍‍	11	–	19	–	0	.367	27	–	30	–	0	.474
Tennessee ‍‍‍	9	–	21	–	0	.300	29	–	28	–	0	.509
Missouri ‍‍‍	9	–	21	–	0	.300	26	–	30	–	0	.464
Western
No. 10 Mississippi State ^{x}‍†‍‍^{y}	21	–	9	–	0	.700	44	–	18	–	1	.706
No. 9 Texas A&M ‍‍‡‍^{y}	20	–	10	–	0	.667	49	–	16	–	0	.754
No. 13 LSU ‍‍‍^{y}	19	–	11	–	0	.633	45	–	21	–	0	.682
Ole Miss ‍‍‍^{y}	18	–	12	–	0	.600	43	–	19	–	0	.694
Alabama ‍‍‍	15	–	15	–	0	.500	32	–	26	–	0	.552
Auburn ‍‍‍	8	–	22	–	0	.267	23	–	33	–	0	.411
Arkansas ‍‍‍	7	–	23	–	0	.233	26	–	29	–	0	.473
x – Division champion † – Conference champion ‡ – Tournament champion y – Invited to the NCAA tournament Rankings from Collegiate Baseball

2016 Southern Conference baseball standings
	Conf.				Overall
Team	W		L	PCT	W		L	PCT
Mercer ‍†‍‍	16	–	8	.667	38	–	23	.623
Western Carolina ‍‍‡‍^{y}	15	–	9	.625	31	–	31	.500
UNC Greensboro ‍‍‍	15	–	9	.625	38	–	21	.644
Furman ‍‍‍	14	–	10	.583	29	–	30	.492
Samford ‍‍‍	13	–	11	.542	35	–	26	.574
East Tennessee State ‍‍‍	13	–	11	.542	27	–	30	.474
Wofford ‍‍‍	12	–	12	.500	30	–	28	.517
The Citadel ‍‍‍	6	–	18	.250	17	–	42	.288
VMI ‍‍‍	4	–	20	.167	21	–	35	.375
† – Conference champion ‡ – Tournament champion y – Invited to the NCAA tournament As of June 11, 2016; Rankings from Collegiate Baseball

2016 Southland Conference baseball standings
	Conf.				Overall
Team	W		L	PCT	W		L	PCT
Sam Houston State ‍†‍‡‍^{y}	24	–	6	.800	42	–	22	.656
Southeastern Louisiana ‍‍‍^{y}	22	–	8	.733	40	–	21	.656
Lamar ‍‍‍	20	–	10	.667	35	–	19	.648
Northwestern State ‍‍‍	20	–	10	.667	33	–	24	.579
Central Arkansas ‍‍‍	16	–	14	.533	29	–	27	.518
McNeese State ‍‍‍	15	–	15	.500	31	–	25	.554
New Orleans ‍‍‍	14	–	16	.467	31	–	26	.544
Stephen F. Austin ‍‍‍	14	–	16	.467	30	–	30	.500
Nicholls State ‍‍‍	14	–	16	.467	26	–	30	.464
Houston Baptist ‍‍‍	12	–	18	.400	24	–	29	.453
Texas A&M-Corpus Christi ‍‍‍	8	–	20	.286	19	–	32	.373
Abilene Christian * ‍‍‍	8	–	21	.276	16	–	37	.302
Incarnate Word * ‍‍‍	5	–	22	.185	13	–	38	.255
† – Conference champion ‡ – Tournament champion y – Invited to the NCAA tournament * Ineligible for league and NCAA tournaments due to transition from Division II; As of June 11, 2016; Rankings from Collegiate Baseball

2016 Southwestern Athletic Conference baseball standings
	Conf.				Overall
Team	W		L	PCT	W		L	PCT
East
Alabama State ^{x}‍‍‡‍^{y}	24	–	0	1.000	38	–	17	.691
Jackson State ‍‍‍	14	–	10	.583	34	–	26	.567
Alcorn State ‍‍‍	10	–	14	.417	16	–	36	.308
Alabama A&M ‍‍‍	8	–	16	.333	13	–	44	.228
Mississippi Valley State ‍‍‍	4	–	20	.167	6	–	36	.143
West
Arkansas–Pine Bluff ^{x}‍‍‍	16	–	5	.762	22	–	25	.468
Grambling State ‍‍‍	15	–	8	.652	22	–	27	.449
Texas Southern ‍‍‍	13	–	10	.565	24	–	26	.480
Southern ‍‍‍	6	–	14	.300	14	–	32	.304
Prairie View A&M ‍‍‍	5	–	18	.217	10	–	32	.238
‡ – Tournament champion y – Invited to the NCAA tournament As of June 11, 2016; Rankings from Collegiate Baseball

2016 Sun Belt Conference baseball standings
	Conf.				Overall
Team	W		L	PCT	W		L	PCT
No. 19 Louisiana–Lafayette †‡^{y} ‍‍‍	21	–	9	.700	43	–	21	.672
No. 26 South Alabama ‍†‍‍^{y}	21	–	9	.700	42	–	22	.656
Little Rock ‍‍‍	17	–	13	.567	26	–	28	.481
Troy ‍‍‍	17	–	13	.567	32	–	26	.552
Texas State ‍‍‍	16	–	14	.533	31	–	28	.525
Georgia Southern ‍‍‍	16	–	14	.533	36	–	24	.600
UT Arlington ‍‍‍	15	–	15	.500	30	–	28	.517
Arkansas State ‍‍‍	13	–	17	.433	29	–	29	.500
Louisiana–Monroe ‍‍‍	10	–	20	.333	20	–	35	.364
Georgia State ‍‍‍	10	–	20	.333	24	–	31	.436
Appalachian State ‍‍‍	9	–	21	.300	18	–	36	.333
† – Conference champion ‡ – Tournament champion y – Invited to the NCAA tournament As of June 11, 2016; Rankings from Collegiate Baseball

2016 West Coast Conference baseball standings
	Conf.				Overall
Team	W		L	PCT	W		L	PCT
BYU ‍†‍‍	18	–	9	.667	37	–	17	.685
Gonzaga ‍†‍‍^{y}	18	–	9	.667	36	–	21	.632
Saint Mary's ‍†‍‡‍^{y}	18	–	9	.667	33	–	25	.569
Pepperdine ‍‍‍	16	–	11	.593	29	–	24	.547
San Francisco ‍‍‍	14	–	13	.519	22	–	34	.393
Loyola Marymount ‍‍‍	13	–	14	.481	26	–	27	.491
San Diego ‍‍‍	13	–	14	.481	27	–	29	.482
Pacific ‍‍‍	12	–	15	.444	22	–	30	.423
Santa Clara ‍‍‍	10	–	17	.370	23	–	29	.442
Portland ‍‍‍	3	–	24	.111	17	–	37	.315
† – Conference champion ‡ – Tournament champion y – Invited to the NCAA tournament As of June 11, 2016; Rankings from Collegiate Baseball

=== Conference winners and tournaments ===
Twenty-nine athletic conferences each end their regular seasons with a single-elimination tournament or a double-elimination tournament. The teams in each conference that win their regular season title are given the number one seed in each tournament. The winners of these tournaments receive automatic invitations to the 2016 NCAA Division I baseball tournament.

Conference	Regular season winner	Conference Player of the Year	Conference Pitcher of the Year	Conference Coach of the Year	Conference tournament	Tournament venue (city)	Tournament winner
America East Conference	Binghamton	David MacKinnon, Hartford	Mike Bunal, Binghamton	Tim Sinicki, Binghamton	2016 America East Conference baseball tournament	Edward A. LeLacheur Park; Lowell, MA	Binghamton
American Athletic Conference	Tulane	Joe DeRoche-Duffin, Connecticut	Anthony Kay, UConn	Jim Penders, UConn	2016 American Athletic Conference baseball tournament	Bright House Field; Clearwater, FL	Connecticut
Atlantic 10 Conference	Rhode Island	Deon Stafford, Saint Joseph's	Tyler Wilson, Rhode Island	Raphael Cerrato, Rhode Island	2016 Atlantic 10 Conference baseball tournament	Houlihan Park; Bronx, NY	Rhode Island
Atlantic Coast Conference	Atlantic - Louisville; Coastal - Miami (FL)	Seth Beer, Clemson	Drew Harrington, Louisville	Dan McDonnell, Louisville	2016 Atlantic Coast Conference baseball tournament	Durham Bulls Athletic Park; Durham, NC	Clemson
Atlantic Sun Conference	Kennesaw State	Jake Noll, Florida Gulf Coast	Brady Puckett, Lipscomb	Mike Sansing, Kennesaw State	2016 Atlantic Sun Conference baseball tournament	Ken Dugan Field at Stephen Lee Marsh Stadium; Nashville, TN	Stetson
Big 12 Conference	Texas Tech	Eric Gutierrez, Texas Tech	Thomas Hatch, Oklahoma State	Tim Tadlock, Texas Tech	2016 Big 12 Conference baseball tournament	Chickasaw Bricktown Ballpark; Oklahoma City, OK	TCU
Big East Conference	Xavier	Andre Jernigan, Xavier	Thomas Hackimer, St. John's	Scott Googins, Xavier	2016 Big East Conference baseball tournament	Leidos Field at Ripken Stadium; Aberdeen, MD	Xavier
Big South Conference	Coastal Carolina	Connor Owings, Coastal Carolina	Andrew Beckwith, Coastal Carolina	Gary Gilmore, Coastal Carolina	2016 Big South Conference baseball tournament	Lexington County Baseball Stadium; Lexington, SC	Coastal Carolina
Big Ten Conference	Minnesota	Matt Fiedler, Minnesota	Cody Sedlock, Illinois	John Anderson, Minnesota	2016 Big Ten Conference baseball tournament	TD Ameritrade Park; Omaha, NE	Ohio State
Big West Conference	Cal State Fullerton	Dalton Blaser, Cal State Fullerton	Darren McCaughan, Long Beach State	Rick Vanderhook, Cal State Fullerton	No tournament, regular season champion earns auto bid		
Colonial Athletic Association	UNC Wilmington	Nick Feight, UNC Wilmington	Aaron Civale, Northeastern & Ryan Foster, UNC Wilmington	Mark Scalf, UNC Wilmington	2016 Colonial Athletic Association baseball tournament	CofC Baseball Stadium at Patriot's Point; Mount Pleasant, SC	William & Mary
Conference USA	Florida Atlantic	C. J. Chatham, Florida Atlantic	Jon Duplantier, Rice	Jeff Waggoner, Marshall	2016 Conference USA baseball tournament	Pete Taylor Park; Hattiesburg, MS	Southern Miss
Horizon League	Wright State	Daulton Varsho, Milwaukee	Brian Keller, Milwaukee	Greg Lovelady, Wright State	2016 Horizon League baseball tournament	Campus Sites	Wright State
Ivy League	Gehrig - Princeton; Rolfe - Dartmouth/Yale	Tim Graul, Penn	Chad Powers, Princeton	Scott Bradley, Princeton	2016 Ivy League Baseball Championship Series	Campus Sites	Princeton
Metro Atlantic Athletic Conference	Fairfield	Christian Santisteban, Manhattan	Ricky Dennis, Monmouth	Bill Currier, Fairfield	2016 Metro Atlantic Athletic Conference baseball tournament	Dutchess Stadium; Wappingers Falls, NY	Fairfield
Mid-American Conference	East - Kent State; West - Ball State	Alex Call, Ball State	Eric Lauer, Kent State	Jeff Duncan, Kent State	2016 Mid-American Conference baseball tournament	All Pro Freight Stadium; Avon, OH	Western Michigan
Mid-Eastern Athletic Conference	Northern - Norfolk State; Southern - Florida A&M	Dylan Dillard, Florida A&M	Matt Outman, Norfolk State	Jamey Shouppe, Florida A&M	2016 Mid-Eastern Athletic Conference baseball tournament	Arthur W. Perdue Stadium; Salisbury, MD	Bethune-Cookman
Missouri Valley Conference	Dallas Baptist	Darick Hall, Dallas Baptist	Colin Poche, Dallas Baptist	Dan Heefner, Dallas Baptist	2016 Missouri Valley Conference baseball tournament	Bob Warn Field at Sycamore Stadium; Terre Haute, IN	Dallas Baptist
Mountain West Conference	Fresno State	Carl Stajduhar, New Mexico	Griffin Jax, Air Force & Jimmy Lambert, Fresno State	Mike Batesole, Fresno State	2016 Mountain West Conference baseball tournament	Santa Ana Star Field; Albuquerque, NM	New Mexico
Northeast Conference	Bryant	Robby Rinn, Bryant	James Karinchak, Bryant	Steve Owens, Bryant	2016 Northeast Conference baseball tournament	Senator Thomas J. Dodd Memorial Stadium; Norwich, CT	Bryant
Ohio Valley Conference	Southeast Missouri State	Armando Alvarez, Eastern Kentucky & Kevin Strohschein, Tennessee Tech	Joey Lucchesi, Southeast Missouri State	Steve Bieser, Southeast Missouri State	2016 Ohio Valley Conference baseball tournament	The Ballpark at Jackson; Jackson, TN	Southeast Missouri State
Pac-12 Conference	Utah	Brett Cumberland, UCLA	Troy Rallings, Washington	Bill Kinneberg, Utah	No tournament, regular season champion earns auto bid		
Patriot League	Navy	Mike Garzillo, Lehigh	Luke Gillingham, Navy	Paul Kostacopoulos, Navy	2016 Patriot League baseball tournament	Campus Sites	Navy
Southeastern Conference	East – South Carolina; West – Mississippi State	Boomer White, Texas A&M	Logan Shore, Florida	John Cohen, Mississippi State	2016 Southeastern Conference baseball tournament	Hoover Metropolitan Stadium; Hoover, AL	Texas A&M
Southern Conference	Mercer	Kyle Lewis, Mercer	Will Gaddis, Furman	Link Jarrett, UNC Greensboro	2016 Southern Conference baseball tournament	Fluor Field at the West End; Greenville, SC	Western Carolina
Southland Conference	Sam Houston State	Jameson Fisher, Southeastern Louisiana	Adam Oller, Northwestern State	Matt Deggs, Sam Houston State	2016 Southland Conference baseball tournament	Constellation Field; Sugar Land, TX	Sam Houston State
Southwestern Athletic Conference	East - Alabama State; West - Arkansas–Pine Bluff	Carlos Ocasio, Alabama State	Joseph Camacho, Alabama State	Mervyl Melendez, Alabama State	2016 Southwestern Athletic Conference baseball tournament	Wesley Barrow Stadium; New Orleans, LA	Alabama State
Summit League	Oral Roberts	Clayton Taylor, Omaha	Tyler Fox, Omaha	Ryan Folmar, Oral Roberts	2016 Summit League baseball tournament	J. L. Johnson Stadium; Tulsa, OK	Oral Roberts
Sun Belt Conference	Louisiana-Lafayette	Ryan Scott, Arkansas–Little Rock	Kevin Hill, South Alabama	Chris Curry, Arkansas–Little Rock	2016 Sun Belt Conference baseball tournament	Bobcat Ballpark; San Marcos, TX	Louisiana-Lafayette
West Coast Conference	Saint Mary's	Jeff Bohling, Gonzaga	A.J. Puckett, Pepperdine	Eric Valenzuela, Saint Mary's	2016 West Coast Conference baseball tournament	Banner Island Ballpark; Stockton, CA	Saint Mary's
Western Athletic Conference	Seattle	Daniel Johnson, New Mexico State	Nick Meservey, Seattle	Donny Harrel, Seattle	2016 Western Athletic Conference baseball tournament	Hohokam Stadium; Mesa, AZ	Utah Valley

== College World Series ==
The 2016 College World Series began on June 18 in Omaha, Nebraska.

First round
1	Florida	1
Coastal Carolina	2
TCU	5
5	Texas Tech	3
1	Florida	2
5	Texas Tech	3
3	Miami (FL)	1
Arizona	5
UC Santa Barbara	0
Oklahoma State	1
3	Miami (FL)	3
UC Santa Barbara	5

Second round
Coastal Carolina	1
TCU	6
5	Texas Tech	5
Coastal Carolina	7
Arizona	0
Oklahoma State	1
UC Santa Barbara	0
Arizona	3

Semifinals
TCU	1	5
Coastal Carolina	4	7
Oklahoma State	3	1
Arizona	9	5

Championship series
Coastal Carolina	0	5	4
Arizona	3	4	3

== Coaching changes ==
This table lists programs that changed head coaches at any point from the first day of the 2016 season until the day before the first day of the 2017 season.

Team	Former coach	Interim coach	New coach	Reason
Alabama	Mitch Gaspard		Greg Goff	Resigned
Alabama State	Mervyl Melendez		José Vázquez	Left for FIU
Appalachian State	Billy Jones		Kermit Smith	Fired
Army	Matt Reid		Jim Foster	Fired
Butler	Steve Farley		Dave Schrage	Fired
FIU	Turtle Thomas		Mervyl Melendez	Fired
Furman	Ron Smith		Brett Harker	Fired
Jacksonville	Tim Montez		Chris Hayes	Fired
Kentucky	Gary Henderson		Nick Mingione	Fired
Lamar	Jim Gilligan		Will Davis	Retired
Liberty	Jim Toman		Scott Jackson	Fired
Louisiana Tech	Greg Goff		Lane Burroughs	Left for Alabama
Missouri	Tim Jamieson		Steve Bieser	Fired
Northwestern State	Lane Burroughs		Bobby Barbier	Leave for Louisiana Tech
Oakland	John Musachio		Jacke Healey / Colin Kaline	Fired
Omaha	Bob Herold		Jack Sweeney	Fired
Purdue	Doug Schreiber		Mark Wasikowski	Resigned
San Jose State	Dave Nakama		Jason Hawkins	Fired
South Dakota State	Dave Schrage		Rob Bishop	Leave for Butler
SIU Edwardsville	Tony Stoecklin		Sean Lyons	Fired
Southeast Missouri State	Steve Bieser		Andy Sawyers	Leave for Missouri
Texas	Augie Garrido		David Pierce	Resigned
Tulane	David Pierce		Travis Jewett	Left for Texas
UCF	Terry Rooney		Greg Lovelady	Fired
Wright State	Greg Lovelady		Jeff Mercer	Left for UCF
Villanova	Joe Godri		Kevin Mulvey	Fired
Youngstown State	Steve Gillispie		Dan Bertolini	Fired

== See also ==
- 2016 NCAA Division I baseball rankings
- 2016 NCAA Division I baseball tournament
