= 2016 Arizona Wildcats baseball team =

American college baseball season

2016 Arizona Wildcats baseball

Starkville Super Regional champions Lafayette Regional champions

College World Series Runner-up vs. Coastal Carolina
- Conference: Pac-12 Conference

Ranking
- Coaches: No. 2
- CB: No. 2
- Record: 49–23 (17–15 Pac-12)
- Head coach: Jay Johnson (1st season)
- Assistant coaches: Sergio Brown (1st season); Dave Lawn (1st season); Marc Wanaka (1st season)
- Home stadium: Hi Corbett Field

2016 Pac-12 Conference baseball standings
	Conf.				Overall
Team	W		L	PCT	W		L	PCT
Utah ‍†‍‍^{y}	19	–	11	.633	26	–	29	.473
No. 22 Washington ‍‍‍^{y}	17	–	13	.567	33	–	23	.589
No. 29 Arizona State ‍‍‍^{y}	16	–	14	.533	36	–	23	.610
No. 2 Arizona ‍‍‍^{y}	17	–	15	.531	49	–	23	.681
Oregon State ‍‍‍	16	–	14	.533	35	–	19	.648
Southern California ‍‍‍	15	–	15	.500	28	–	28	.500
Stanford ‍‍‍	15	–	15	.500	31	–	23	.574
California ‍‍‍	14	–	16	.467	32	–	21	.604
Oregon ‍‍‍	14	–	16	.467	29	–	26	.527
UCLA ‍‍‍	12	–	18	.400	25	–	31	.446
Washington State ‍‍‍	11	–	19	.367	19	–	35	.352
† – Conference champion y – Invited to the NCAA tournament As of June 11, 2016; Rankings from Collegiate Baseball

The 2016 Arizona Wildcats baseball team represented the University of Arizona in the 2016 NCAA Division I baseball season. The Wildcats played their home games at Hi Corbett Field, off campus in Tucson, Arizona. Jay Johnson was in his first season as Arizona Wildcats baseball head coach. Johnson was in his fourth year as a head coach.

== Personnel ==
=== Roster ===
2016 Arizona Wildcats roster
Pitchers: 15 – Cody Deason – Freshman; 17 – Randy Labaut – Freshman; 22 – Kevin Ginkel – Junior; 25 – Austin Rubick – Freshman; 26 – Michael Flynn – Freshman; 27 – JC Cloney – Junior; 29 – Rio Gomez – Sophomore; 30 – Tyler Crawford – Senior; 33 – Austin Schnabel – Junior; 34 – Robby Medel – Sophomore; 35 – Nathan Bannister – Senior; 36 – Kaleb Roper – Freshman; 37 – Cody Moffett – Senior; 38 – Matt Hartman – Sophomore; 40 – Luke Soroko – Junior; 44 – Trent Johnson – Freshman; 47 – Cameron Ming – Sophomore	Catchers: 6 – Ryan Haug – Sophomore; 12 – Cesar Salazar – Freshman; Infielders: 1 – Sawyer Gieseke – Junior; 3 – Bobby Dalbec – Junior; 5 – Louis Boyd – Junior; 13 – Cody Ramer – Senior; 14 – Casey Bowman – Sophomore; 24 – J. J. Matijevic – Sophomore; 28 – Kyle Lewis – Junior; 31 – Michael Hoard – Junior	Outfielders: 4 – Justin Behnke – Senior; 20 – Alfonso Rivas – Freshman; 21 – Ryan Aguilar – Senior; 23 – Zach Gibbons – Senior; 42 – Jared Oliva – Sophomore

=== Coaches ===
2016 Arizona Wildcats baseball coaching staff
- Jay Johnson – Head coach
- Sergio Brown – Assistant coach
- Dave Lawn – Assistant coach
- Marc Wanaka – Volunteer assistant coach

=== Opening day ===
Opening Day Starters
Name	Position
Cody Ramer	Second baseman
Jared Oliva	Center fielder
Ryan Aguilar	First baseman
Bobby Dalbec	Third baseman
Zach Gibbons	Right fielder
J.J. Matijevic	Designated hitter
Ryan Haug	Catcher
Justin Behnke	Left fielder
Louis Boyd	Shortstop
J.C. Cloney	Starting pitcher

== Schedule and results ==
2016 Arizona Wildcats baseball game log
Regular season

February
Date	Opponent	Rank	Site/stadium	Score	Win	Loss	Save	Attendance	Overall record	Pac-12 Record
Feb 19	at #20 Rice*		Reckling Park • Houston, TX	W 8–0	Cloney (1–0)	Fox (0–1)	None	3,368	1–0	
Feb 20	at #20 Rice*		Reckling Park • Houston, TX	W 6–2	Dalbec (1–0)	Otto (0–1)	None	3,145	2–0	
Feb 21	at #20 Rice*		Reckling Park • Houston, TX	L 3–4	Myers (1–0)	Rivas (0–1)	None	2,752	2–1	
Feb 22	at Lamar*	#23	Vincent–Beck Stadium • Beaumont, TX	L 5–13	Andrews (1–0)	Medel (0–1)	Moore (1)	671	2–2	
Feb 26	vs #20 Tulane*	#23	Tony Gwynn Stadium • San Diego, CA (Tony Gwynn Classic)	L 10–11	Yandel (1–1)	Dalbec (1–1)	None		2–3	
Feb 27	vs Nebraska*	#23	Tony Gwynn Stadium • San Diego, CA (Tony Gwynn Classic)	W 11–10	Dalbec (2–1)	Luensmann (0–1)	None		3–3	
Feb 28	at San Diego State*	#23	Tony Gwynn Stadium • San Diego, CA (Tony Gwynn Classic)	W 7–3	Gomez (1–0)	Diamond (0–2)	None	713	4–3	

March
Date	Opponent	Rank	Site/stadium	Score	Win	Loss	Save	Attendance	Overall record	Pac-12 Record
Mar 2	#29 Cal State Fullerton*		Hi Corbett Field • Tucson, AZ	W 2–0	Bannister (1–0)	Conine (1–1)	Dalbec (1)	2,883	5–3	
Mar 4	Northwestern State*		Hi Corbett Field • Tucson, AZ	L 4–6	Oller (1–0)	Medel (0–2)	Jones (1)	2,712	5–4	
Mar 5	Cal State Bakersfield*		Hi Corbett Field • Tucson, AZ	W 4–1	Cloney (2–0)	Monarez (0–1)	Dalbec (2)	2,820	6–4	
Mar 6	Saint Mary's*		Hi Corbett Field • Tucson, AZ	W 11–5	Flynn (1–0)	Buckley (1–1)	None	1,922	7–4	
Mar 6	Northwestern State*		Hi Corbett Field • Tucson, AZ	W 4–1	Bannister (2–0)	Hymel (1–2)	Dalbec (3)	2,834	8–4	
Mar 11	Sacramento State*		Hi Corbett Field • Tucson, AZ	W 3–1	Dalbec (3–1)	Long (1–3)	None	2,228	9–4	
Mar 12	Sacramento State*		Hi Corbett Field • Tucson, AZ	W 23–1	Bannister (3–0)	Kukuk (1–1)	None	2,194	10–4	
Mar 13	Sacramento State*		Hi Corbett Field • Tucson, AZ	W 8–4	Medel (1–2)	Dillon (0–1)	Dalbec (4)	2,243	11–4	
Mar 15	New Mexico State*		Hi Corbett Field • Tucson, AZ	W 11–8	Schnabel (1–0)	Shalberg (1–3)	Dalbec (5)	2,741	12–4	
Mar 18	at Washington		Husky Ballpark • Seattle, WA	L 3–6	Bremer (3–0)	Cloney (1–2)	Rallings (4)	670	12–5	0–1
Mar 19	at Washington		Husky Ballpark • Seattle, WA	L 4–8	Ballowe (1–0)	Bannister (3–1)	None	750	12–6	0–2
Mar 20	at Washington		Husky Ballpark • Seattle, WA	W 17–7	Dalbec (4–1)	Jones (1–2)	None	602	13–6	1–2
Mar 22	Utah Valley*		Hi Corbett Field • Tucson, AZ	W 14–0	Moffett (1–0)	Bowman (0–2)	None	2,086	14–6	
Mar 24	#25 UCLA		Hi Corbett Field • Tucson, AZ	W 6–1	Cloney (3–1)	Canning (3–2)	None	2,851	15–6	2–2
Mar 25	#25 UCLA		Hi Corbett Field • Tucson, AZ	L 3–4	Dyer (1–1)	Dalbec (4–2)	None	3,885	15–7	2–3
Mar 26	#25 UCLA		Hi Corbett Field • Tucson, AZ	W 6–5	Ginkel (1–0)	Burke (1–2)	None	3,180	16–7	3–3
Mar 29	UC Riverside*		Hi Corbett Field • Tucson, AZ	L 5–6	Landazuri (3–3)	Medel (1–3)	Lillie (1)	2,024	16–8	
Mar 30	UC Riverside*		Hi Corbett Field • Tucson, AZ	W 4–3	Dalbec (5–2)	Worrell (0–3)	None	1,975	17–8	

April
Date	Opponent	Rank	Site/stadium	Score	Win	Loss	Save	Attendance	Overall record	Pac-12 Record
Apr 1	at Utah		Smith's Ballpark • Salt Lake City, UT	L 3–6	Rose (3–2)	Dalbec (5–3)	Drachler (4)	1,143	17–9	3–4
Apr 2	at Utah		Smith's Ballpark • Salt Lake City, UT	L 6–7	Rodriguez (0–1)	Rubick (0–1)	None	1,162	17–10	3–5
Apr 3	at Utah		Smith's Ballpark • Salt Lake City, UT	L 2–4	Stoltz (1–1)	Deason (0–1)	Drachler (5)	1,492	17–11	3–6
Apr 4	at #22 BYU*		Larry H. Miller Field • Provo, UT	W 11–5	Dalbec (6–3)	Wood (0–1)	None	2,825	18–11	
Apr 8	Washington State		Hi Corbett Field • Tucson, AZ	W 8–0	Bannister (4–1)	Hamilton (1–7)	None	3,065	19–11	4–6
Apr 9	Washington State		Hi Corbett Field • Tucson, AZ	L 2–6	Walker (4–1)	Cloney (3–2)	None	3,464	19–12	4–7
Apr 10	Washington State		Hi Corbett Field • Tucson, AZ	W 7–3	Dalbec (7–3)	Dupre (0–2)	Ginkel (1)	1,683	20–12	5–7
Apr 12	at Arizona State*		Phoenix Municipal Stadium • Phoenix, AZ	L 5–7	Aboites (2–1)	Deason (0–2)	Lingos (1)	2,649	20–13	5–8
Apr 15	Stanford		Hi Corbett Field • Tucson, AZ	W 4–1	Bannister (5–1)	Beck (4–3)	None	3,706	21–13	6–8
Apr 16	Stanford		Hi Corbett Field • Tucson, AZ	W 4–1	Ming (1–0)	Castellanos (4–2)	None	3,327	22–13	7–8
Apr 17	Stanford		Hi Corbett Field • Tucson, AZ	L 5–6	Hock (3–2)	Moffett (1–1)	None	3,041	22–14	7–9
Apr 20	New Mexico State*		Hi Corbett Field • Tucson, AZ	W 8–7	Rivas (1–1)	Shalberg (1–4)	None	2,263	23–14	
Apr 22	at California		Evans Diamond • Berkeley, CA	W 3–0	Bannister (6–1)	Dodson	None		24–14	8–9
Apr 23	at California		Evans Diamond • Berkeley, CA	W 8–5	Dalbec (8–3)	Siomkin (0–1)	None	1,394	25–14	9–9
Apr 24	at California		Evans Diamond • Berkeley, CA	W 7–5	Rivas (2–1)	Bain (3–3)	None	1,758	26–14	10–9
Apr 26	at #27 Arizona State*	#17	Phoenix Municipal Stadium • Phoenix, AZ	W 8–0	Ginkel (2–0)	Todd (1–4)	None	2,942	27–14	11–9
Apr 28	at Southern California	#17	Dedeaux Field • Los Angeles, CA	W 8–5	Gomez (2–0)	Kriske (1–2)	Dalbec (6)	440	28–14	12–9
Apr 29	at Southern California	#17	Dedeaux Field • Los Angeles, CA	L 5–8	Davis (4–6)	Cloney (3–3)	None	774	28–15	12–10
Apr 30	at Southern California	#17	Dedeaux Field • Los Angeles, CA	L 2–5	Huberman (2–1)	Ming (1–1)	Paschke (3)	1,257	28–16	12–11

May
Date	Opponent	Rank	Site/stadium	Score	Win	Loss	Save	Attendance	Overall record	Pac-12 Record
May 6	Oregon State	#19	Hi Corbett Field • Tucson, AZ	W 6–1	Bannister (7–1)	Eckert (5–3)	None	3,895	29–16	13–11
May 7	Oregon State	#19	Hi Corbett Field • Tucson, AZ	W 4–1	Cloney (4–3)	Heimlich (5–3)	Ginkel (2)	3,172	30–16	14–11
May 8	Oregon State	#19	Hi Corbett Field • Tucson, AZ	W 6–5	Ming (2–1)	Engelbrekt (2–3)	None	2,472	31–16	15–11
May 13	#28 Arizona State	#17	Hi Corbett Field • Tucson, AZ	L 2–5	Martinez (8–3)	Bannister (7–2)	Erives (7)	6,324	31–17	15–12
May 14	#28 Arizona State	#17	Hi Corbett Field • Tucson, AZ	W 4–2	Cloney (5–3)	Lingos (3–3)	Dalbec (7)	8,067	32–17	16–12
May 15	#28 Arizona State	#17	Hi Corbett Field • Tucson, AZ	L 1–5	Aboites (5–1)	Ginkel (2–1)	Erives (8)	3,648	32–18	16–13
May 20	at Oregon	#21	PK Park • Eugene, OR	L 0–3	Irvin (6–4)	Ming (2–2)	Nogosek (14)	1,491	32–19	16–14
May 21	at Oregon	#21	PK Park • Eugene, OR	L 2–4	Peterson (4–4)	Dalbec (8–4)	Nogosek (15)	1,982	32–20	16–15
May 22	at Oregon	#21	PK Park • Eugene, OR	W 5–4	Bannister (8–2)	Mercer (2–1)	Gomez (1)	1,393	33–20	17–15
May 24	Abilene Christian*	#24	Hi Corbett Field • Tucson, AZ	W 12–1	Ginkel (3–1)	Carroll (3–8)	None	2,123	34–20	
May 25	Abilene Christian*	#24	Hi Corbett Field • Tucson, AZ	W 8–3	Gomez (3–0)	deMeyere (4–9)	None	2,474	35–20	
May 27	at Hawaii*	#24	Les Murakami Stadium • Honolulu, HI	W 11–2	Cloney (6–3)	Von Ruden (7–3)	None	3,473	36–20	
May 28	at Hawaii*	#24	Les Murakami Stadium • Honolulu, HI	W 6–1	Bannister (9–2)	Hatch (3–7)	None	3,876	37–20	
May 29	at Hawaii*	#24	Les Murakami Stadium • Honolulu, HI	W 5–3	Deason (1–2)	Valencia (3–2)	Rivas (1)	3,475	38–20	

Postseason

NCAA Lafayette Regional
Date	Opponent	Rank	Site/stadium	Score	Win	Loss	Save	Attendance	Overall record	NCAAT record
June 3	(3) Sam Houston State	(2) #26	M. L. Tigue Moore Field • Lafayette, LA	W 7–3	Bannister (10–2)	Donica (10–4)	None	3,445	39–20	1–0
June 5	(1) #14 Louisiana–Lafayette	(2) #26	M. L. Tigue Moore Field • Lafayette, LA	L 3–10	Leger (7–3)	Cloney (6–4)	Huval (3)	3,638	39–21	1–1
June 5	(3) Sam Houston State	(2) #26	M. L. Tigue Moore Field • Lafayette, LA	W 6–5	Dalbec (9–4)	Mills (2–3)	Rivas (2)	3,476	40–21	2–1
June 6	(1) #14 Louisiana–Lafayette	(2) #26	M. L. Tigue Moore Field • Lafayette, LA	W 6–3	Bannister (11–2)	Guillory (5–6)	Ginkel (3)	3,673	41–21	3–1
June 6	(1) #14 Louisiana–Lafayette	(2) #26	M. L. Tigue Moore Field • Lafayette, LA	W 3–1	Ginkel (4–1)	Marks (5–7)	Ming (1)	3,674	42–21	4–1

NCAA Starkville Super Regional
Date	Opponent	Rank	Site/stadium	Score	Win	Loss	Save	TV	Attendance	Overall record	NCAAT record
June 10	#4 Mississippi State	#13	Dudy Noble Field • Starkville, MS	W 1–0	Dalbec (10–4)	Hudson (9–5)	Ming (2)	ESPN2	12,913	43–21	5–1
June 11	#4 Mississippi State	#13	Dudy Noble Field • Starkville, MS	W 6–5^{11}	Ming (3–2)	Smith (2–1)	None	ESPNU	13,452	44–21	6–1

College World Series
Date	Opponent	Rank	Site/stadium	Score	Win	Loss	Save	TV	Attendance	Overall record	CWS record
June 18	(3) #2 Miami (FL)	#7	TD Ameritrade Park • Omaha, NE	W 5–1	Bannister (12–2)	Mediavilla (11–2)	None	ESPN	25,715	45–21	1–0
June 20	#6 Oklahoma State	#7	TD Ameritrade Park • Omaha, NE	L 1–0	Buffett (9–3)	Dalbec (10–5)	Cobb (6)	ESPN	22,981	45–22	1–1
June 22	#8 UC Santa Barbara	#7	TD Ameritrade Park • Omaha, NE	W 3–0	Cloney (7–4)	Kelly (2–1)	Ming (3)	ESPN	22,133	46–22	2–1
June 24	#6 Oklahoma State	#7	TD Ameritrade Park • Omaha, NE	W 9–3	Ginkel (5–1)	Elliott (9–3)	Ming (4)	ESPN 2	16,549	47–22	3–1
June 25	#6 Oklahoma State	#7	TD Ameritrade Park • Omaha, NE	W 5–1	Dalbec (11–5)	Hatch (9–3)	Rivas (3)	ESPN 2	9,326	48–22	4–1
June 27	#5 Coastal Carolina	#7	TD Ameritrade Park • Omaha, NE	W 3–0	Cloney (8–4)	Hopeck (3–4)	None	ESPN	20,789	49–22	5–1
June 28	#5 Coastal Carolina	#7	TD Ameritrade Park • Omaha, NE	L 4–5	Holmes (7–2)	Ming (3–3)	None	ESPN	24,716	49–23	5–2
June 30	#5 Coastal Carolina	#7	TD Ameritrade Park • Omaha, NE	L 3–4	Bethwick (15–1)	Dalbec (11–6)	Cunningham (1)	ESPNU	18,823	49–24	5–3

=== Lafayette Regional ===
Lafayette Regional Teams
(1) Louisiana-Lafayette Ragin' Cajuns	(4) Princeton Tigers	(2) Arizona Wildcats	(3) Sam Houston State Bearkats

=== Starkville Super Regional ===
Starkville Super Regional Teams
Arizona Wildcats	vs.	(6) Mississippi State Bulldogs

== College World Series ==
2016 College World Series Teams
(1) Florida Gators	Coastal Carolina Chanticleers	TCU Horned Frogs	(5) Texas Tech Red Raiders	(3) Miami Hurricanes	Arizona Wildcats	UC Santa Barbara Gauchos	Oklahoma State Cowboys

First round
1	Florida	1
Coastal Carolina	2
TCU	5
5	Texas Tech	3
1	Florida	2
5	Texas Tech	3
3	Miami (FL)	1
Arizona	5
UC Santa Barbara	0
Oklahoma State	1
3	Miami (FL)	3
UC Santa Barbara	5

Second round
Coastal Carolina	1
TCU	6
5	Texas Tech	5
Coastal Carolina	7
Arizona	0
Oklahoma State	1
UC Santa Barbara	0
Arizona	3

Semifinals
TCU	1	5
Coastal Carolina	4	7
Oklahoma State	3	1
Arizona	9	5

Championship series
Coastal Carolina	0	5	4
Arizona	3	4	3

== Rankings ==
Ranking movements Legend: ██ Increase in ranking ██ Decrease in ranking — = Not ranked
	Week																		
Poll	Pre	1	2	3	4	5	6	7	8	9	10	11	12	13	14	15	16	17	Final
Coaches'	—	—*	—*	—	—	—	—	—	—	—	—	—	20	—	—	—	—*	—*	2
Baseball America	—	—	—	—	—	—	—	—	—	—	—	—	21	—	—	—	—*	—*	2
Collegiate Baseball^	—	23	—	—	—	—	30	—	—	—	17	19	17	21	24	26	13	7	2
NCBWA†	—	—	—	—	—	—	—	—	—	—	27	29	25	29	—	29	14	14*	2

^ Collegiate Baseball ranked 40 teams in their preseason poll, but only ranked 30 teams weekly during the season.
† NCBWA ranks 30 teams in their preseason poll, but only ranks 25 teams weekly during the season.
* A new poll was not released for this week, so for comparison purposes, the previous week's ranking is inserted in this week's slot.

== 2016 MLB draft ==
Player	Position	Round	Overall	MLB team
Bobby Dalbec	3B	4	118	Boston Red Sox
Zach Gibbons	OF	17	516	Los Angeles Angels
Cody Ramer	SS	19	576	Los Angeles Angels
Kevin Ginkel	RHP	22	659	Arizona Diamondbacks
Trey Griffey	CF	24	717	Seattle Mariners
Nathan Bannister	RHP	28	837	Seattle Mariners
Ryan Aguilar	1B	31	921	Milwaukee Brewers
