= 2016 Conference USA baseball tournament =

- Teams: 8
- Format: Double elimination
- Finals site: Pete Taylor Park; Hattiesburg, Mississippi
- Champions: Southern Miss (3rd title)
- Winning coach: Scott Berry (2nd title)
- MVP: Daniel Keating (Southern Miss)
- Television: CUSADN (First round–semifinals); CBSSN (Championship game)

2016 Conference USA baseball standings
	Conf.				Overall
Team	W		L	PCT	W		L	PCT
Florida Atlantic ‍†‍‍^{y}	21	–	8	.724	39	–	18	.684
Marshall ‍‍‍	21	–	9	.700	34	–	21	.618
No. 27 Southern Miss ‍‍‡‍^{y}	20	–	10	.667	41	–	19	.683
No. 30 Rice ‍‍‍^{y}	19	–	10	.655	38	–	24	.613
Louisiana Tech ‍‍‍^{y}	19	–	11	.633	41	–	19	.683
Old Dominion ‍‍‍	15	–	15	.500	32	–	24	.571
FIU ‍‍‍	15	–	15	.500	29	–	29	.500
Charlotte ‍‍‍	12	–	17	.414	23	–	32	.418
UAB ‍‍‍	12	–	18	.400	21	–	34	.382
Western Kentucky ‍‍‍	10	–	20	.333	24	–	30	.444
UTSA ‍‍‍	8	–	20	.286	17	–	34	.333
Middle Tennessee ‍‍‍	5	–	24	.172	20	–	35	.364
† – Conference champion ‡ – Tournament champion y – Invited to the NCAA tournament As of June 5, 2016; Rankings from Collegiate Baseball

The 2016 Conference USA baseball tournament was held from May 25 through 29 at Pete Taylor Park in Hattiesburg, Mississippi. The annual tournament determines the conference champion of the Division I Conference USA for college baseball. The tournament champion received the league's automatic bid to the 2016 NCAA Division I baseball tournament.

The tournament was established in 1996, Conference USA's first season of play. Rice has won the most championships, with six.

== Seeding and format ==
The top eight finishers from the regular season will be seeded one through eight. The tournament will use a double elimination format.

Team	W	L	Pct	GB	Seed
Florida Atlantic	21	8	.724	–	1
Marshall	21	9	.700	0.5	2
Southern Miss	20	10	.667	1.5	3
Rice	19	10	.655	2	4
Louisiana Tech	19	11	.633	2.5	5
Old Dominion	15	15	.500	6.5	6
FIU	15	15	.500	6.5	7
Charlotte	12	17	.414	9	8
UAB	12	18	.400	9.5	–
Western Kentucky	10	20	.333	11.5	–
UTSA	8	20	.286	12.5	–
Middle Tennessee	5	24	.172	16	–

== Bracket and results ==
First round
1	Florida Atlantic	7
8	Charlotte	5
4	Rice	13
5	Louisiana Tech	12
8	Charlotte	3
5	Louisiana Tech	13
3	Southern Miss	17
6	Old Dominion	5
2	Marshall	5
7	FIU	3
6	Old Dominion	1
7	FIU	3

Second round
1	Florida Atlantic	4
4	Rice	6
5	Louisiana Tech	5
1	Florida Atlantic	4
3	Southern Miss	9
2	Marshall	3
7	FIU	6
2	Marshall	7

Semifinals
4	Rice	10	11
5	Louisiana Tech	13	9
3	Southern Miss	3	X
2	Marshall	2	X

Final
4	Rice	2
3	Southern Miss	3

== Conference championship ==
Conference USA Championship
(3) Southern Miss Golden Eagles	vs.	(4) Rice Owls

May 29, 2016, 1:00 p.m. (CDT) at Pete Taylor Park in Hattiesburg, Mississippi
Team	1	2	3	4	5	6	7	8	9	R	H	E
(3) Southern Miss	0	0	0	0	1	0	0	1	1	3	6	0
(4) Rice	0	1	0	0	0	0	0	0	1	2	10	2
WP: Nick Johnson (3–1) LP: Jon Duplantier (7–6) Sv: Nick Sandlin (12); Home runs: USM: None; Rice: None; Attendance: 3,593

== All–Tournament Team ==
Position	Player	Team
C	Chuckie Robinson	Southern Miss
IF	Aaron Bossi	Marshall
IF	Ford Proctor	Rice
IF	Connor Teykl	Rice
IF	Tim Lynch	Southern Miss
OF	Raphael Gladu	Louisiana Tech
OF	Corey Bird	Marshall
OF	Jake Sandlin	Southern Miss
DH	Daniel Keating (MVP)	Southern Miss
P	Cody Crouse	FIU
P	Chase Boster	Marshall
P	Sam Sinnen	Old Dominion
P	Jon Duplantier	Rice
