= 2016 Mississippi State Bulldogs baseball team =

American college baseball season

2016 Mississippi State Bulldogs baseball

Starkville Regional champions SEC Regular season champions
- Conference: Southeastern Conference
- Western Division

Ranking
- Coaches: No. 4
- Record: 44–18–1 (21–9 SEC)
- Head coach: John Cohen (8th season)
- Assistant coaches: Nick Mingione (4th season); Wes Johnson (1st season)
- Home stadium: Dudy Noble Field

2016 Southeastern Conference baseball standings
	Conf.						Overall
Team	W		L		T	PCT	W		L		T	PCT
Eastern
No. 12 South Carolina ^{x}‍‍‍^{y}	20	–	9	–	0	.690	46	–	18	–	0	.719
No. 7 Florida ‍‍‍^{y}	19	–	10	–	0	.655	52	–	16	–	0	.765
No. 23 Vanderbilt ‍‍‍^{y}	18	–	12	–	0	.600	43	–	19	–	0	.694
Kentucky ‍‍‍	15	–	15	–	0	.500	32	–	25	–	0	.561
Georgia ‍‍‍	11	–	19	–	0	.367	27	–	30	–	0	.474
Tennessee ‍‍‍	9	–	21	–	0	.300	29	–	28	–	0	.509
Missouri ‍‍‍	9	–	21	–	0	.300	26	–	30	–	0	.464
Western
No. 10 Mississippi State ^{x}‍†‍‍^{y}	21	–	9	–	0	.700	44	–	18	–	1	.706
No. 9 Texas A&M ‍‍‡‍^{y}	20	–	10	–	0	.667	49	–	16	–	0	.754
No. 13 LSU ‍‍‍^{y}	19	–	11	–	0	.633	45	–	21	–	0	.682
Ole Miss ‍‍‍^{y}	18	–	12	–	0	.600	43	–	19	–	0	.694
Alabama ‍‍‍	15	–	15	–	0	.500	32	–	26	–	0	.552
Auburn ‍‍‍	8	–	22	–	0	.267	23	–	33	–	0	.411
Arkansas ‍‍‍	7	–	23	–	0	.233	26	–	29	–	0	.473
x – Division champion † – Conference champion ‡ – Tournament champion y – Invited to the NCAA tournament Rankings from Collegiate Baseball

The 2016 Mississippi State Bulldogs baseball team represented the Mississippi State University in the 2016 NCAA Division I baseball season. The Bulldogs played their home games at Dudy Noble Field.

== Personnel ==
=== Roster ===
2016 Mississippi State Bulldogs roster
Pitchers: 17 Paul Young – Junior; 18 Keegan James – Freshman; 20 Jared Padgett – Freshman; 23 Austin Sexton – Junior; 25 Dakota Hudson – Junior; 28 Ryan Cyr – Freshman; 31 Ryan Rigby – Sophomore; 32 Vance Tatum – Junior; 33 Parker Ford – Freshman; 34 Kale Breaux – Freshman; 38 Trent Waddell – Senior; 39 Logan Elliot – Junior; 41 Zac Houston – Junior; 42 Blake Smith – Junior; 44 Ethan Small – Freshman; 45 Jacob Billingsley – (redshirt) Sophomore; 46 Trysten Barlow – Freshman; 47 Myles Gentry – Junior; 48 Konnor Pilkington – Freshman; 49 Daniel Brown – Freshman; 51 Noah Hughes – Freshman	Catchers: 9 Elih Marrero – Freshman; 16 Josh Lovelady – Senior; 35 Jack Kruger – Junior; Infielders: 6 Luke Alexander – Freshman; 10 Ryan Gridley – Sophomore; 13 John Holland – Senior; Outfielders: 5 Mike Smith – Senior; 7 Jacob Robson – Junior; 19 Brent Rooker – Sophomore; 26 Cody Brown – Junior; 52 Tanner Poole – Junior; 53 Brant Blaylock – Freshman	Utility: 2 Hunter Stovall – Freshman; 3 Luke Reynolds – Junior; 8 Gavin Collins – Junior; 12 Reid Humphreys – Junior; 14 Cole Gordon – Freshman; 15 Jake Mangum – Freshman; 36 Nathaniel Lowe – Junior

=== Coaching staff ===
2016 Mississippi State Bulldogs baseball coaching staff
- John Cohen – Head coach – 7th year
- Nick Mingione – Assistant coach, 7 years at Mississippi State – (4th as AC)
- Wes Johnson – Assistant coach – 1st year
- Lee VanHorn – Coordinator of baseball operations – 1st year
- Will Coggin – Coordinator of camps – 1st year

== Schedule and results ==
2016 Mississippi State Bulldogs baseball game log
Regular season (40–14–1)

February (6–2)
Date	Opponent	Rank	Site/stadium	Score	Win	Loss	Save	TV	Attendance	Overall record	SEC record
Feb. 19	Florida Atlantic	# 11	Dudy Noble Field • Starkville, MS	L 6–10	Brandon Rhodes (1–0)	Kale Breaux (0–1)	none	SECN+	9,413	0–1	–
Feb. 20	South Dakota State	# 11	Dudy Noble Field • Starkville, MS	W 17–4	Keegan James (1–0)	Landon Busch (0–1)	none	SECN+		1–1	–
Feb. 20	Florida Atlantic	#11	Dudy Noble Field • Starkville, MS	L 0–4	Marc Stewart (1–0)	Austin Sexton (0–1)	none	SECN+	9,405	1–2	–
Feb. 21	South Dakota State	#11	Dudy Noble Field • Starkville, MS	W 15–5 ^{7}	Blake Smith (1–0)	Eldon Evans (0–1)	none	SECN+	6,608	2–2	–
Feb. 23	Memphis		Dudy Noble Field • Starkville, MS	Postponed to 4/13, inclement weather							
Feb. 26	UMass Lowell		Dudy Noble Field • Starkville, MS	W 4–2	Dakota Hudson (1–0)	Steve Xirinachs (1–0)	Blake Smith (1)	SECN+	7,692	3–2	–
Feb. 27	Nicholls State		Dudy Noble Field • Starkville, MS	W 5–0	Austin Sexton (1–1)	Cole Stapler (1–1)	none			4–2	–
Feb. 27	UMass Lowell		Dudy Noble Field • Starkville, MS	W 4–2	Daniel Brown (1–0)	Nick Kuzia (0–1)	Reid Humphreys (1)		8,962	5–2	–
Feb. 28	Nicholls State		Dudy Noble Field • Starkville, MS	W 8–0	Zac Houston (1–0)	Alex Ernestine (1–1)	none		7,438	6–2	–

March (12–5–1)
Date	Opponent	Rank	Site/stadium	Score	Win	Loss	Save	TV	Attendance	Overall record	SEC record
Mar. 1	Alcorn State	#23	Dudy Noble Field • Starkville, MS	W 14–0	Keegan James (2–0)	Jahborus Smith (0–1)	none	SECN+	5,823	7–2	–
Mar. 4	at #21 UCLA	#23	Jackie Robinson Stadium • Los Angeles, CA	L 1–2	Griffen Canning (2–0)	Dakota Hudson (1–1)	Brian Gadsby (2)		1,166	7–3	–
Mar. 5	vs. USC	#23	Jackie Robinson Stadium • Los Angeles, CA	W 8–7	Blake Smith (2–0)	Mason Perryman (1–1)	Kale Breaux (1)		428	8–3	–
Mar. 6	vs. Oklahoma	#23	Dodger Stadium • Los Angeles, CA	T 5–5	none	none	none		1,543	8–3–1	–
Mar. 8	South Alabama	#26	Dudy Noble Field • Starkville, MS	W 7–3	Ethan Small (1–0)	Hunter Soleymani (1–1)	none	SECN+	6,761	9–3–1	–
Mar. 11	#8 Oregon	#26	Dudy Noble Field • Starkville, MS	W 10–4	Dakota Hudson (2–1)	Cole Irvin (2–1)	Vance Tatum (1)	SECN+	6,454	10–3–1	–
Mar. 12	#8 Oregon	#26	Dudy Noble Field • Starkville, MS	W 9–3	Austin Sexton (2–1)	Matt Krook (0–1)	none	SECN+	6,627	11–3–1	–
Mar. 13	#8 Oregon	#26	Dudy Noble Field • Starkville, MS	W 5–2	Daniel Brown (2–0)	David Peterson (2–1)	Reid Humphreys (2)	SECN+	6,461	12–3–1	–
Mar. 15	Eastern Kentucky	#13	Dudy Noble Field • Starkville, MS	L 12–16 ^{10}	Caleb Johnson (2–1)	Blake Smith (2–1)	none	SECN+	6,878	12–4–1	–
Mar. 16	Oral Roberts	#13	Dudy Noble Field • Starkville, MS	L 1–3	Cale Tims (1–0)	Jared Padgett (0–1)	Brady Womacks (4)	SECN+	6,404	12–5–1	–
Mar. 18	at #2 Vanderbilt	#13	Hawkins Field • Nashville, TN	W 2–1 ^{13}	Ryan Rigby (1–0)	Matt Ruppenthal (0–1)	none	SECN	3,626	13–5–1	1–0
Mar. 19	at #2 Vanderbilt	#13	Hawkins Field • Nashville, TN	W 5–4	Kale Breaux (1–1)	Hayden Stone (0–1)	Noah Hughes (1)	SECN	3,636	14–5–1	2–0
Mar. 20	at #2 Vanderbilt	#13	Hawkins Field • Nashville, TN	L 6–12	Kyle Wright (4–0)	Daniel Brown (2–1)	Patrick Raby (1)	SECN+	3,330	14–6–1	2–1
Mar. 22	Mississippi Valley State	#11	Dudy Noble Field • Starkville, MS	W 16–1	Konnor Pilkington (1–0)	Fredrick Spe (1–2)	none	SECN+	6,867	15–6–1	–
Mar. 24	Georgia	#11	Dudy Noble Field • Starkville, MS	W 9–2	Dakota Hudson (3–1)	Kevin Smith (3–1)	none	SECN+	6,895	16–6–1	3–1
Mar. 25	Georgia	#11	Dudy Noble Field • Starkville, MS	W 3–1	Ryan Rigby (2–0)	Drew Moody (0–2)	none	SECN+	7,497	17–6–1	4–1
Mar. 26	Georgia	#11	Dudy Noble Field • Starkville, MS	L 8–11	Bo Tucker (3–1)	Daniel Brown (2–2)	Blake Cairnes (1)	SECN+	7,512	17–7–1	4–2
Mar. 29	vs. Southern Miss	#7	Trustmark Park • Pearl, MS	W 13–5	Ryan Rigby (3–0)	Cody Livingston (1–2)	none		5,982	18–7–1	–

April (12–7)
Date	Opponent	Rank	Site/stadium	Score	Win	Loss	Save	TV	Attendance	Overall record	SEC record
April 1	#14 Ole Miss	#7	Dudy Noble Field • Starkville, MS	W 3–1	Dakota Hudson (4–1)	Brady Bramlett (4–2)	none	SECN+	10,152	19–7–1	5–2
April 2	#14 Ole Miss	#7	Dudy Noble Field • Starkville, MS	W 6–2	Austin Sexton (3–1)	Chad Smith (2–3)	none	SECN+	11,515	20–7–1	6–2
April 3	#14 Ole Miss	#7	Dudy Noble Field • Starkville, MS	L 5–8	Wyatt Short (2–1)	Ryan Rigby (3–1)	Will Stokes (3)	SECN+	10,164	20–8–1	6–3
April 5	UT Martin	#8	Dudy Noble Field • Starkville, MS	Canceled							
April 5	UT Martin	#8	Dudy Noble Field • Starkville, MS	W 14–0	Ryan Cyr (1–0)	Adam Rimmer (0–1)	none	SECN+	7,014	21–8–1	–
April 8	at #1 Florida	#8	McKethan Stadium • Gainesville, FL	L 2–8	Logan Shore (6–0)	Dakota Hudson (4–2)	none	SECN+	3,927	21–9–1	6–4
April 9	at #1 Florida	#8	McKethan Stadium • Gainesville, FL	W 10–4	Ryan Rigby (4–1)	Alex Faedo (6–1)	none	SECN+	6,244	22–9–1	7–4
April 10	at #1 Florida	#8	McKethan Stadium • Gainesville, FL	W 2–1	Zac Houston (2–0)	Dane Dunning (2–2)	Reid Humphreys (3)	SECN	3,720	23–9–1	8–4
April 13	Memphis	#5	Dudy Noble Field • Starkville, MS	W 11–1	Kale Breaux (2–1)	James Muse (0–3)	none	SECN+	7,043	24–9–1	–
April 15	#8 Texas A&M	#5	Dudy Noble Field • Starkville, MS	L 3–10	Brigham Hill (5–0)	Dakota Hudson (4–3)	none	SECN+	10,032	24–10–1	8–5
April 16	#8 Texas A&M	#5	Dudy Noble Field • Starkville, MS	L 6–10	Jace Vines (6–0)	Austin Sexton (3–2)	Mark Ecker (2)	SECN+	15,078	24–11–1	8–6
April 17	#8 Texas A&M	#5	Dudy Noble Field • Starkville, MS	L 5–10	Mitchell Kilkenny (2–0)	Reid Humphreys (0–1)	none	SECN+	8,786	24–12–1	8–7
April 20	vs. Louisiana–Monroe	#10	MGM Park • Biloxi, MS	W 1–0 ^{14}	Keegan James (3–0)	Tyler Schwaner (0–1)	none		4,474	25–12–1	–
April 22	at #15 LSU	#10	Alex Box Stadium • Baton Rouge, LA	W 12–8	Dakota Hudson (5–3)	Jared Poche' (5–4)	Reid Humphreys (4)	SECN+	10,884	26–12–1	9–7
April 23	at #15 LSU	#10	Alex Box Stadium • Baton Rouge, LA	W 2–1	Austin Sexton (4–2)	Alex Lange (4–3)	Reid Humphreys (5)	ESPNU	11,588	27–12–1	10–7
April 24	at #15 LSU	#10	Alex Box Stadium • Baton Rouge, LA	L 8–11	Russell Reynolds (1–0)	Konnor Pilkington (1–1)	none	ESPN2	10,034	27–13–1	10–8
April 26†	vs. #24 Ole Miss	#8	Trustmark Park • Pearl, MS	W 2–0	Zac Houston (3–0)	Chad Smith (3–4)	Jacob Billingsley (1)	SECN	8,542	28–13–1	–
April 28	at Alabama	#8	Sewell–Thomas Stadium • Tuscaloosa, AL	W 12–5	Dakota Hudson (6–3)	Geoffrey Bramblett (3–3)	Blake Smith (2)	ESPNU	4,064	29–13–1	11–8
April 29	at Alabama	#8	Sewell–Thomas Stadium • Tuscaloosa, AL	Postponed to 4/30, inclement weather							
April 30	at Alabama	#8	Sewell–Thomas Stadium • Tuscaloosa, AL	L 3–4 ^{9}	Matt Foster (5–3)	Ryan Cyr (1–1)	none	SECN+	4,064	29–14–1	11–9
April 30	at Alabama	#8	Sewell–Thomas Stadium • Tuscaloosa, AL	W 2–1 ^{7}	Konnor Pilkington (2–1)	Nick Eicholtz (3–2)	Daniel Brown (1)	SECN+	6,644	30–14–1	12–9

May (10–0)
Date	Opponent	Rank	Site/stadium	Score	Win	Loss	Save	TV	Attendance	Overall record	SEC record
May 5	Missouri	#8	Dudy Noble Field • Starkville, MS	W 8–2	Dakota Hudson (7–3)	Reggie McClain (4–3)	none	SECN	6,630	31–14–1	13–9
May 6	Missouri	#8	Dudy Noble Field • Starkville, MS	W 4–3	Austin Sexton (5–2)	Tanner Houck (4–5)	none	ESPNU	6,904	32–14–1	14–9
May 7	Missouri	#8	Dudy Noble Field • Starkville, MS	W 3–1	Daniel Brown (3–2)	Michael Plassmeyer (4–5)	Reid Humphreys (6)	SECN+	7,614	33–14–1	15–9
May 11	at Troy	#7	Riddle–Pace Field • Troy, AL	W 7–3	Zac Houston (4–0)	Cory Gill (3–3)	none		1,488	34–14–1	–
May 13	at Auburn	#7	Plainsman Park • Auburn, AL	W 4–0	Dakota Hudson (8–3)	Cole Lipscomb (2–4)	none	SECN+	2,899	35–14–1	16–9
May 14	at Auburn	#7	Plainsman Park • Auburn, AL	W 16–6	Austin Sexton (6–2)	Justin Camp (3–4)	none	SECN	3,228	36–14–1	17–9
May 15	at Auburn	#7	Plainsman Park • Auburn, AL	W 10–3	Konnor Pilkington (3–1)	Casey Mize (2–4)	none	SECN+	2,813	37–14–1	18–9
May 19	Arkansas	#5	Dudy Noble Field • Starkville, MS	W 7–0	Dakota Hudson (9–3)	Dominic Taccolini (5–5)	none	SECN+	6,822	38–14–1	19–9
May 20	Arkansas	#5	Dudy Noble Field • Starkville, MS	W 5–1	Austin Sexton (7–2)	Isaiah Campbell (3–1)	Reid Humphreys (7)	SECN+	7,195	39–14–1	20–9
May 21	Arkansas	#5	Dudy Noble Field • Starkville, MS	W 9–4	Ryan Rigby (5–1)	Jordan Rodriguez (0–1)	none	SECN	8,421	40–14–1	21–9

Postseason (4–4)

SEC Tournament (1–2)
Date	Opponent	Rank	Site/stadium	Score	Win	Loss	Save	TV	Attendance	Overall record	SECT Record
May 25	vs. Alabama	#1	Hoover Metropolitan Stadium • Hoover, AL	W 4–1	Zac Houston (5–0)	Geoffrey Bramblett (5–4)	Blake Smith (4)	SECN	13,448	41–14–1	1–0
May 26	vs. #9 LSU	#1	Hoover Metropolitan Stadium • Hoover, AL	L 2–6	Jared Poche' (7–4)	Dakota Hudson (9–4)	Parker Bugg (4)	SECN	11,390	41–15–1	1–1
May 27	vs. #6 Florida	#1	Hoover Metropolitan Stadium • Hoover, AL	L 2–12 ^{7}	Alex Faedo (12–1)	Austin Sexton (7–3)	none	SECN	9,429	41–16–1	1–2

NCAA Starkville Regional (3–0)
Date	Opponent	Rank	Site/stadium	Score	Win	Loss	Save	TV	Attendance	Overall record	NCAAT record
June 3	Southeast Missouri State	#4	Dudy Noble Field • Starkville, MS	W 9–5	Daniel Brown (4–2)	Joey Lucchesi (10–5)	none	ESPN3	9,378	42–16–1	1–0
June 4	#23 Cal State Fullerton	#4	Dudy Noble Field • Starkville, MS	W 4–1	Austin Sexton (8–3)	Colton Eastman (8–3)	Blake Smith (5)	ESPN3	10,656	43–16–1	2–0
June 5	Louisiana Tech	#4	Dudy Noble Field • Starkville, MS	W 4–0	Zac Houston (6–0)	Braden Bristo (5–6)	Ryan Rigby (1)	ESPN3	9,092	44–16–1	3–0

NCAA Starkville Super Regional (0–2)
Date	Opponent	Rank	Site/stadium	Score	Win	Loss	Save	TV	Attendance	Overall record	NCAAT record
June 10	#13 Arizona	#4	Dudy Noble Field • Starkville, MS	L 0–1	Bobby Dalbec (10–4)	Dakota Hudson (9–5)	Cameron Ming (2)	ESPN2	12,913	44–17–1	3–1
June 11	#13 Arizona	#4	Dudy Noble Field • Starkville, MS	L 5–6 ^{11}	Cameron Ming (2–2)	Blake Smith (2–1)	none	ESPNU	13,452	44–18–1	3–2

† Indicates the game does not count toward the 2016 Southeastern Conference standings.
*Rankings are based on the team's current ranking in the Collegiate Baseball poll.

== Record vs. conference opponents ==
Last two do not qualify for conf. tourn. Blank are not scheduled. Blue are home games, otherwise away.

2016 SEC baseball records Source: 2016 SEC baseball game results
Team	W–L	ALA	ARK	AUB	FLA	UGA	KEN	LSU	MSU	MIZZ	MISS	SCAR	TENN	TAMU	VAN	Team	Div	SR	SW
ALA	15–15		3–0	2–1	.	1–2	1–2	2–1	1–2	.	2–1	0–3	2–1	1–2	.	ALA	W5	5–5	1–1
ARK	7–23	0–3		3–0	0–3	.	2–1	0–3	0–3	1–2	0–3	0–3	.	1–2	.	ARK	W7	2–8	1–6
AUB	8–22	1–2	0–3		.	.	2–1	1–2	0–3	1–2	0–3	.	2–1	1–2	0–3	AUB	W6	2–8	0–4
FLA	19–10	.	3–0	.		2–1	1–2	1–2	1–2	3–0	.	1–1	2–1	3–0	2–1	FLA	E2	6–3	3–0
UGA	11–19	2–1	.	.	1–2		1–2	.	1–2	2–1	1–2	2–1	1–2	0–3	0–3	UGA	E5	3–7	0–2
KEN	15–15	2–1	1–2	1–2	2–1	2–1		.	.	2–1	0–3	2–1	2–1	.	1–2	KEN	E4	6–4	0–1
LSU	19–11	1–2	3–0	2–1	2–1	.	.		1–2	3–0	1–2	.	3–0	1–2	2–1	LSU	W3	6–4	3–0
MSU	21–9	2–1	3–0	3–0	2–1	2–1	.	2–1		3–0	2–1	.	.	0–3	2–1	MSU	W1	9–1	3–1
MIZZ	9–21	.	2–1	2–1	0–3	1–2	1–2	0–3	0–3		.	0–3	3–0	.	0–3	MIZZ	E7	2–8	1–4
MISS	18–12	1–2	3–0	3–0	.	2–1	3–0	2–1	1–2	.		0–3	2–1	1–2	.	MISS	W4	6–4	3–1
SCAR	20–9	3–0	3–0	.	1–1	1–2	1–2	.	.	3–0	3–0		3–0	1–2	1–2	SCAR	E1	5–4	5–0
TENN	9–21	1–2	.	1–2	1–2	2–1	1–2	0–3	.	0–3	1–2	0–3		.	2–1	TENN	E6	2–8	0–3
TAMU	20–10	2–1	2–1	2–1	0–3	3–0	.	2–1	3–0	.	2–1	2–1	.		2–1	TAMU	W2	9–1	2–1
VAN	18–12	.	.	3–0	1–2	3–0	2–1	1–2	1–2	3–0	.	2–1	1–2	1–2		VAN	E3	5–5	3–0
Team	W–L	ALA	ARK	AUB	FLA	UGA	KEN	LSU	MSU	MIZZ	MISS	SCAR	TENN	TAMU	VAN	Team	Div	SR	SW

Updated for entire regular season.

== Rankings ==
Ranking movements Legend: ██ Increase in ranking ██ Decrease in ranking — = Not ranked
	Week																		
Poll	Pre	1	2	3	4	5	6	7	8	9	10	11	12	13	14	15	16	17	Final
Coaches'	17	17*	17	23	15	16	12	10	8	11	4	4	4	4	3 6	4	4*	4*	11
Baseball America	20	24	24	24	15	10	5	5	2	7	3	3	3	3	2	4	4*	4*	10
Collegiate Baseball^	11	—	23	26	13	11	7	8	5	10	8	8	7	5	1	4	4	10	10
NCBWA†	19	24	19	20	14	14	11	8	4	7	3	3	3	3	1	4	4	4*	11

^ Collegiate Baseball ranked 40 teams in their preseason poll, but only ranked 30 teams weekly during the season.
† NCBWA ranks 30 teams in their preseason poll, but only ranks 25 teams weekly during the season.
* A new poll was not released for this week, so for comparison purposes, the previous week's ranking is inserted in this week's slot.

== MLB draft ==
A school record 11 players were selected in the draft. It is 3rd most in the NCAA for the 2016 season trailing only Texas A&M with 13 and Southern California with 12.

Player	Position	Round	Overall	MLB team
Dakota Hudson	RHP	1	34	St. Louis Cardinals
Reid Humphreys	RHP/OF	7	200	Colorado Rockies
Daniel Brown	LHP	7	201	Milwaukee Brewers
Jacob Robson	OF	8	235	Detroit Tigers
Zac Houston	RHP	11	325	Detroit Tigers
Nathaniel Lowe	1B	13	390	Tampa Bay Rays
Gavin Collins	C/3B	13	392	Cleveland Indians
Vance Tatum	LHP	18	553	Kansas City Royals
Austin Sexton	RHP	18	556	St. Louis Cardinals
Jack Kruger	C/DH	20	606	Los Angeles Angels
Brent Rooker†	OF/DH	38	1143	Minnesota Twins

† Rooker returned to Mississippi State rather than signing with the Twins. In 2017 the Minnesota Twins draft him in the 1st round.
