= 2016 Oregon State Beavers baseball team =

American college baseball season

2016 Oregon State Beavers baseball
- Conference: Pac-12 Conference
- Record: 35–19 (16–14 Pac-12)
- Head coach: Pat Casey (22nd season)
- Assistant coaches: Pat Bailey (9th season); Andy Jenkins (4th season)
- Pitching coach: Nate Yeskie (8th season)
- Home stadium: Goss Stadium at Coleman Field

2016 Pac-12 Conference baseball standings
| | Conf. | | | | Overall |
| Team | W | | L | PCT | W | | L | PCT |
|---|---|---|---|---|---|---|---|---|
| Utah ‍†‍‍^{y} | 19 | – | 11 | .633 | 26 | – | 29 | .473 |
| No. 22 Washington ‍‍‍^{y} | 17 | – | 13 | .567 | 33 | – | 23 | .589 |
| No. 29 Arizona State ‍‍‍^{y} | 16 | – | 14 | .533 | 36 | – | 23 | .610 |
| No. 2 Arizona ‍‍‍^{y} | 17 | – | 15 | .531 | 49 | – | 23 | .681 |
| Oregon State ‍‍‍ | 16 | – | 14 | .533 | 35 | – | 19 | .648 |
| Southern California ‍‍‍ | 15 | – | 15 | .500 | 28 | – | 28 | .500 |
| Stanford ‍‍‍ | 15 | – | 15 | .500 | 31 | – | 23 | .574 |
| California ‍‍‍ | 14 | – | 16 | .467 | 32 | – | 21 | .604 |
| Oregon ‍‍‍ | 14 | – | 16 | .467 | 29 | – | 26 | .527 |
| UCLA ‍‍‍ | 12 | – | 18 | .400 | 25 | – | 31 | .446 |
| Washington State ‍‍‍ | 11 | – | 19 | .367 | 19 | – | 35 | .352 |
† – Conference champion y – Invited to the NCAA tournament As of June 11, 2016; Rankings from Collegiate Baseball

The 2016 Oregon State Beavers baseball team represented Oregon State University in the 2016 NCAA Division I baseball season. The Beavers played their home games at Goss Stadium at Coleman Field and as members of the Pac-12 Conference. The team was coached by Pat Casey in his 22nd season at Oregon State.
