= Brent Rooker =

American baseball player (born 1994)

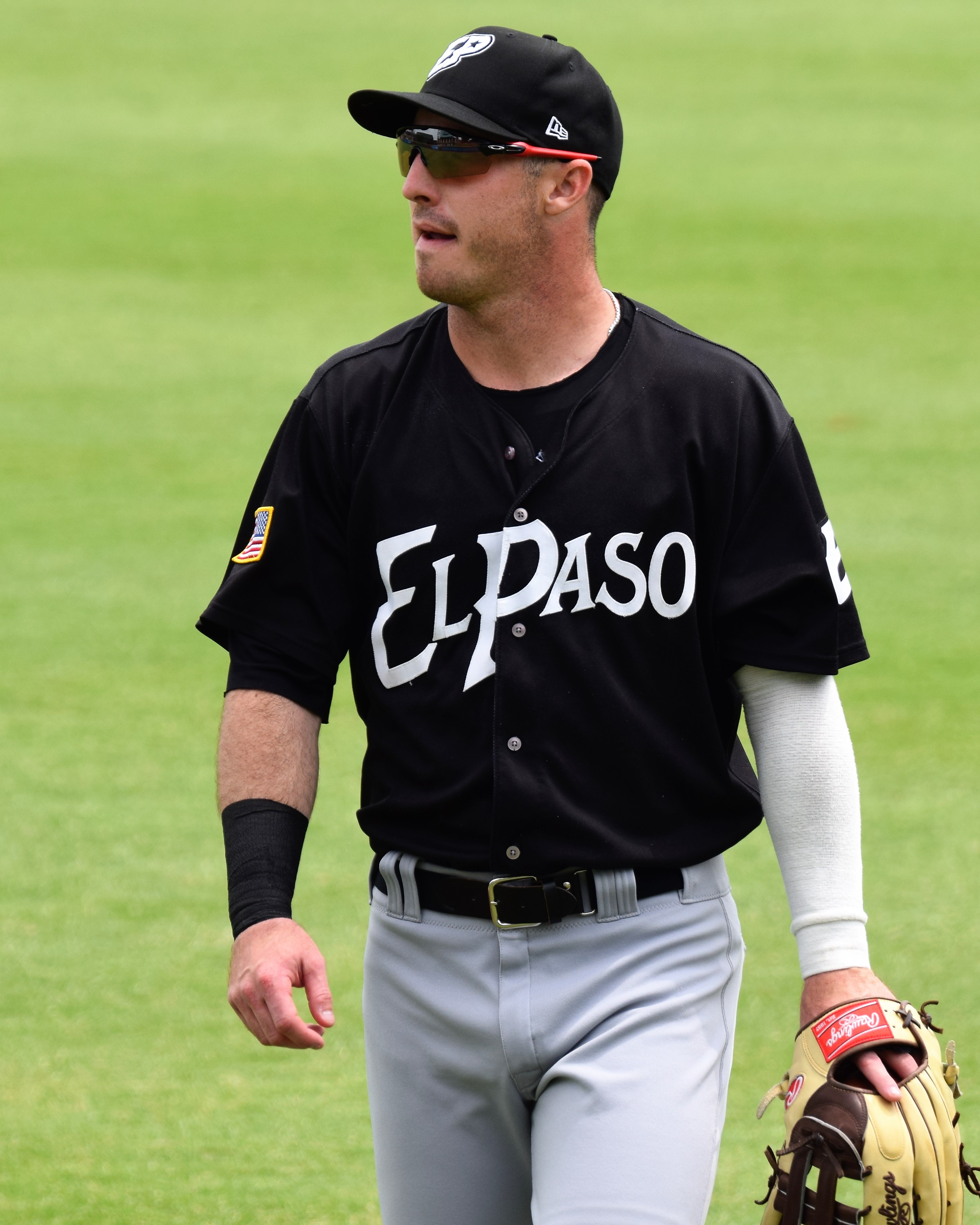
- Rooker with the El Paso Chihuahuas in 2022

Athletics – No. 25
- Designated hitter / Outfielder
- Born: November 1, 1994 (age 31); Germantown, Tennessee, U.S.
- Bats: Right Throws: Right

MLB debut
- September 4, 2020, for the Minnesota Twins

MLB statistics (through 2026 season)
- Batting average: .254
- Home runs: 119
- Runs batted in: 322
- Stats at Baseball Reference

Teams
- Minnesota Twins (2020–2021); San Diego Padres (2022); Kansas City Royals (2022); Oakland Athletics / Athletics (2023–present)

Career highlights and awards
- 2× All-Star (2023, 2025); Silver Slugger Award (2024)

Terry Brent Rooker Jr. (born November 1, 1994) is an American professional baseball designated hitter and outfielder for the Athletics of Major League Baseball (MLB). He has previously played in MLB for the Minnesota Twins, San Diego Padres, and Kansas City Royals. He made his MLB debut in 2020. Rooker was selected to the 2023 MLB All-Star Game and won the American League Silver Slugger Award at designated hitter in 2024. He was again named an All-Star in 2025.

== Early life ==
Rooker was born on November 1, 1994, in Germantown, Tennessee. He attended Evangelical Christian School in Memphis, Tennessee.

== College career ==
Rooker enrolled at Mississippi State University to play college baseball for the Mississippi State Bulldogs. He redshirted for the 2014 season. He played in 34 games in 2015, hitting .257/.325/.378 with two home runs and 12 runs batted in (RBIs). In 2016, he helped lead the Bulldogs to an Southeastern Conference (SEC) championship, hitting .324/.376/.578 with 11 home runs and 54 RBIs. In 2016, he played collegiate summer baseball with the Brewster Whitecaps of the Cape Cod Baseball League, and was named a league all-star.

In 2017, Rooker was named Collegiate Baseball national Player of the Year and SEC Player of the Year after leading the conference with a .387 batting average, 23 home runs, and 82 RBIs, winning only the second triple crown in SEC history, along with a .495 on base percentage, .810 slugging percentage, 30 doubles, and 18 stolen bases. He also won the C Spire Ferriss Trophy, given to Mississippi's top college baseball player.

== Professional career ==
=== Draft and minor leagues ===
The Minnesota Twins selected Rooker with the 35th overall selection of the 2017 Major League Baseball (MLB) draft. He signed with the Twins for a $1.935 million signing bonus. Rooker was assigned to the Elizabethton Twins and was later promoted to the Fort Myers Miracle. In 62 games between both clubs, he batted .281/.364/.566 with 18 home runs, 52 RBIs, and a .930 OPS.

Rooker spent 2018 with the Chattanooga Lookouts. He batted .254/.333/.465 with 22 home runs (second in the Southern League), 79 RBIs (leading the league), 32 doubles (tied for the league lead), and 150 strikeouts (fourth) in 130 games. He spent 2019 with the Rochester Red Wings, earning International League All-Star honors. Over 65 games, he hit .281/.398/.535 with 14 home runs and 47 RBIs.

=== Minnesota Twins (2020–2021) ===
Rooker was named to the taxi squad ahead of the shortened 2020 season. On September 4, he was promoted to the major leagues for the first time and made his major league debut that day against the Detroit Tigers. In 7 games, he hit .319 with one home run. In his rookie season in 2021, Rooker batted .201 with 9 home runs in 58 games.

=== San Diego Padres (2022) ===
On April 7, 2022, the Twins traded Rooker, Taylor Rogers, and cash considerations to the San Diego Padres in exchange for Chris Paddack, Emilio Pagán, and a player to be named later (Brayan Medina). Rooker played in two games for San Diego, batting 0-for-7.

=== Kansas City Royals (2022) ===
On August 2, 2022, the Padres traded Rooker to the Kansas City Royals in exchange for Cam Gallagher. In 14 games for Kansas City, Rooker batted .160/.276/.200 with 2 RBI. On November 15, Rooker was designated for assignment by the Royals.

=== Oakland Athletics / Athletics (2023–present) ===
==== 2023 ====
On November 17, 2022, Rooker was claimed off outright waivers by the Oakland Athletics. He earned a spot on the team out of spring training. On May 1, 2023, Rooker was named the American League (AL) Player of the Week after going 10-for-24 with 5 home runs and 11 RBIs from April 24 through 30. In July, Rooker was named to the MLB All-Star Game as a reserve. He was the team's sole representative. Entering the game as a replacement to Randy Arozarena and playing left field, Rooker went 1–2 with a double.

He led the A's in home runs (30), RBIs (69), OPS (.817), games played (137), at-bats (463), total bases (226) and strikeouts (172). He tied with Esteury Ruiz for the team-lead in hits (114). He led the AL in strikeout percentage (32.7%), while batting .246/.329/.488.

==== 2024 ====
Rooker began the 2024 season as the team's cleanup hitter on Opening Day. After hitting only .200 with two home runs and 16 strikeouts in his first eight games, Rooker was placed on the 10-day injured list on April 11, retroactive to April 8. On May 6, Rooker was named the AL Player of the Week for April 29 to May 5. In 145 games for the Athletics in 2024, he slashed .293/.365/.562 with 39 home runs, 112 RBI, and 11 stolen bases. On October 4, Rooker underwent extensor repair surgery in his right forearm.

==== 2025 ====
On January 7, 2025, Rooker signed a five-year, $60 million contract extension to remain with the Athletics. Rooker played in all 162 games for the first time in his MLB career. He hit .262 with 30 home runs and 89 RBI. He lowered his strikeouts rate to 22.8 percent of plate appearances.

==== 2026 ====
On April 11, 2026, just two weeks into the season, Rooker was placed on the injured list with an oblique strain. It marked the end of Rooker's streak of 213 consecutive team games played. He was reactivated off the list on April 26. On June 12, Rooker was placed on the injured list for the second time in 2026, this time with a bone bruise in his left knee. Rooker was later ruled out for the rest of the season when the Athletics confirmed that he would require surgery to repair torn cartilage in his left knee. In 48 appearances prior to his injury, Rooker had been hitting .200 with 10 home runs and 29 RBI.

== International career ==
Rooker was named to the United States national baseball team for the 2019 WBSC Premier 12. In the tournament, he batted .300/.333/.800 with three home runs and five RBIs in 20 at bats. He was named to the tournament All-World Team as the best designated hitter.

== Personal life ==
Rooker is married and has two daughters. His wife is an emergency room nurse.

Rooker is friends with Vinnie Pasquantino. They met via their agent.

Rooker played football and basketball in high school.
