= 2016 UCLA Bruins baseball team =

American college baseball season

2016 UCLA Bruins baseball
- Conference: Pac-12 Conference
- Record: 25–31 (12–18 Pac-12)
- Head coach: John Savage (12th season)
- Assistant coaches: Rex Peters (5th season); Bryant Ward (1st season); Niko Gallego (2nd season)
- Home stadium: Jackie Robinson Stadium

2016 Pac-12 Conference baseball standings
	Conf.				Overall
Team	W		L	PCT	W		L	PCT
Utah ‍†‍‍^{y}	19	–	11	.633	26	–	29	.473
No. 22 Washington ‍‍‍^{y}	17	–	13	.567	33	–	23	.589
No. 29 Arizona State ‍‍‍^{y}	16	–	14	.533	36	–	23	.610
No. 2 Arizona ‍‍‍^{y}	17	–	15	.531	49	–	23	.681
Oregon State ‍‍‍	16	–	14	.533	35	–	19	.648
Southern California ‍‍‍	15	–	15	.500	28	–	28	.500
Stanford ‍‍‍	15	–	15	.500	31	–	23	.574
California ‍‍‍	14	–	16	.467	32	–	21	.604
Oregon ‍‍‍	14	–	16	.467	29	–	26	.527
UCLA ‍‍‍	12	–	18	.400	25	–	31	.446
Washington State ‍‍‍	11	–	19	.367	19	–	35	.352
† – Conference champion y – Invited to the NCAA tournament As of June 11, 2016; Rankings from Collegiate Baseball

The 2016 UCLA Bruins baseball team represented the University of California, Los Angeles in the 2016 NCAA Division I baseball season. The Bruins competed in the Pac-12 Conference, and played their home games in Jackie Robinson Stadium. John Savage was in his twelfth season as head coach.

== Schedule ==
Legend
	UCLA win
	UCLA loss
	Postponement
**Bold**	UCLA team member

2016 UCLA Bruins baseball game log
Regular season

February
Date	Opponent	Rank	Site/stadium	Score	Win	Loss	Save	Attendance	Overall record	Pac-12 Record
Feb 19	#22 North Carolina*	#10	Jackie Robinson Stadium • Los Angeles, CA	**L** 0–4	Gallen, Zac (1–0)	**Dyer, Grant (0-1)**	Butler, Hansen (1)	1,540	0–1	
Feb 20	#22 North Carolina*	#10	Jackie Robinson Stadium • Los Angeles, CA	**W** 6–5	**Forbes, Tucker (1–0)**	Aker, Cole (0–1)	None	1,319	1–1	
Feb 21	#22 North Carolina*	#10	Jackie Robinson Stadium • Los Angeles, CA	**L** 5–14	Aker, Cole (1–1)	**Bird, Jake (0–1)**	None	1,834	1–2	
Feb 23	Long Beach State*	#14	Jackie Robinson Stadium • Los Angeles, CA	**L** 1-10	Smith, David (1-0)	**Virant, Hunter (0-1)**	None	688	1-3	
Feb 26	at Cal Poly*	#14	Robin Baggett Stadium • San Luis Obispo, CA	**W** 7-6	**Bird, Jake (1-1)**	Smith, Kyle (1-1)	**Gadsby, Brian (1)**	2471	2-3	
Feb 27	at Cal Poly*	#14	Robin Baggett Stadium • San Luis Obispo	**W** 19-0	**Canning, Griffin (1-0)**	Lee, Slater (1-1)	None	1723	3-3	
Feb 28	at Cal Poly*	#14	Robin Baggett Stadium • San Luis Obispo	**L** 2-6	Uelmen, Erich (2-0)	**Molnar, Kyle (0-1)**	None	2007	3-4	

March
Date	Opponent	Rank	Site/stadium	Score	Win	Loss	Save	Attendance	Overall record	Pac-12 Record
Mar 1	at UC Santa Barbara*	#21	Caesar Uyesaka Stadium • Santa Barbara, CA	**L** 6-11	Chapman, Kenny (1-0)	**Burke, Scott (0-1)**	None	318	3-5	
Mar 4	#23 Mississippi State*	#21	Jackie Robinson Stadium • Los Angeles, CA	**W** 2-1	**Canning, Griffin (2-0)**	Hudson, Dakota (1-1)	Gadsby, Brian (2)	1166	4-5	
Mar 5	Oklahoma*	#21	Jackie Robinson Stadium • Los Angeles, CA	**W** 4-2	**Ceja, Moises (1-0)**	Hansen, Alec (0-2)	Gadsby, Brian (3)	1149	5-5	
Mar 6	at Southern California*	#21	Dodger Stadium • Los Angeles, CA	**W** 5-3	**Burke, Scott (1-1)**	Huberman, Marc (1-1)	None	9000	6-5	
Mar 8	at Cal State Northridge*	#23	Matador Field • Northridge, CA	**L** 12-20	Yankie (1-0)	**Virant, Hunter (0-2)**	None	503	6-6	
Mar 11	Texas*	#23	Jackie Robinson Stadium • Los Angeles, CA	**L** 5-7	Malmin, Jon (1-2)	**Canning, Griffin (2-1)**	Kingham, Nolan (1)	731	6-7	
Mar 12	Texas*	#23	Jackie Robinson Stadium • Los Angeles, CA	**W** 7-7	**Gadsby, Brian (1-0)**	Wellmann, Blake (0-1)	None	1,260	7-7	
Mar 13	Texas*	#23	Jackie Robinson Stadium • Los Angeles, CA	**W** 6-3	**Molnar, Kyle (1-1)**	Malmin, Jon (1-3)	Gadsby, Brian (4)	1,644	8-7	
Mar 18	Washington State	#30	Jackie Robinson Stadium • Los Angeles, CA	**W** 5-2	**Canning, Griffin (3-1)**	Hamilton, Ian (0-5)	Gadsby, Brian (5)	713	9-7	1-0
Mar 19	Washington State	#30	Jackie Robinson Stadium • Los Angeles, CA	**W** 6-5	**Gadsby, Brian (2-0)**	Calderhead, Kevin (0-1)	None	893	10-7	2-0
Mar 20	Washington State	#30	Jackie Robinson Stadium • Los Angeles, CA	**W** 11-2	**Molnar, Kyle (2-1)**	McFadden, Parker (2-1)	None	1,136	11-7	3-0
Mar 24	at Arizona	#25	Hi Corbett Field • Tucson, AZ	**L** 1-6	Cloney, JC (3-1)	**Canning, Griffin (3-2)**	None	2,851	11-8	3-1
Mar 25	at Arizona	#25	Hi Corbett Field • Tucson, AZ	**W** 4-3	**Dyer, Grant (1-1)**	Dalbec, Bobby (4-2)	None	3,885	12-8	4-1
Mar 26	at Arizona	#25	Hi Corbett Field • Tucson, AZ	**L** 5-6	Ginkel, Kevin (1-0)	**Burke, Scott (1-2)**	None	3,180	12-9	4-2
Mar 29	Cal State Fullerton*		Jackie Robinson Stadium • Los Angeles, CA	**L** 7-14	Velasquez, Gavin (1-1)	**Bird, Jake (1-2)**	None	1,382	12-10	4-2

April
Date	Opponent	Rank	Site/stadium	Score	Win	Loss	Save	Attendance	Overall record	Pac-12 Record
Apr 1	at California		Evans Diamond • Berkeley, CA	**L** 1-9	Mason, Ryan (4-1)	**Canning, Griffin (3-3)**	None	973	12-11	4-3
Apr 2	at California		Evans Diamond • Berkeley, CA	**L** 2-8	Bain, Jeff (3-1)	**Dyer, Grant (1-2)**	None	1,333	12-12	4-4
Apr 3	at California		Evans Diamond • Berkeley, CA	**L** 3-5	Ladrech, Matt (3-1)	**Molnar, Kyle (2-2)**	None	1,454	12-13	4-5
Apr 5	Cal State Northridge*		Jackie Robinson Stadium • Los Angeles, CA	**L** 1-4	Diaz (1-0)	**Bird, Jake (1-3)**	O'Neil, C (6)	711	12-14	4-5
Apr 7	Stanford		Jackie Robinson Stadium • Los Angeles, CA	**L** 1-4	Castellanos, Chris (4-1)	**Canning, Griffin (3-4)**	Hock, Colton (3)	674	12-15	4-6
Apr 8	Stanford		Jackie Robinson Stadium • Los Angeles, CA	**W** 6-5	**Ceja, Moises (2-0)**	Hock, Colton (2-2)	None	1,006	13-15	5-6
Apr 9	Stanford		Jackie Robinson Stadium • Los Angeles, CA	**L** 2-8	Summerville, Andrew (3-1)	**Molnar, Kyle (2-3)**	Thorne, Tyler (3)	959	13-16	5-7
Apr 12	Loyola Marymount*		Jackie Robinson Stadium • Los Angeles, CA	**W** 6-5	**Gadsby, Brian (3-0)**	Simon, Harrison (2-1)	None	844	14-16	5-7
Apr 15	at Washington		Husky Ballpark • Seattle, WA	"W' 1-0	**Canning, Griffin (4-4)**	Bremer, Noah (4-2)	None	780	15-16	6-7
Apr 16	at Washington		Husky Ballpark • Seattle, WA	**L** 7-8	Jones, Spencer (2-2)	**Forbes, Tucker (1-1)**	Rallings, Troy (8)	1,249	15-17	6-8
Apr 17	at Washington		Husky Ballpark • Seattle, WA	**L** 4-7	Jones, Spencer (3-2)	**Molnar, Kyle (2-4)**	Rallings, Troy (9)	1,388	15-18	6-9
Apr 19	at Pepperdine*		Eddy D. Field Stadium • Malibu, CA	**W** 10-6	**Hooper, Justin (1-0**	Pendergast, Jonathan (2-2)	None	320	16-18	6-9
Apr 21	Oregon		Jackie Robinson Stadium • Los Angeles, CA	**W** 6-3	**Canning, Griffin (5-4)**	Krook, Matt (3-2)	Ceja, Moises (1)	807	17-18	7-9
Apr 22	Oregon		Jackie Robinson Stadium • Los Angeles, CA	**W** 4-2	**Dyer, Grant (2-2)**	Irvin, Cole (3-4)	Ceja, Moises (2)	1,138	18-18	8-9
Apr 23	Oregon		Jackie Robinson Stadium • Los Angeles, CA	**W** 13-1	**Molnar, Kyle (3-4)**	Peterson, David (3-3)	None	1,389	19-18	9-9
Apr 26	at Cal State Fullerton*		Goodwin Field • Fullerton, CA	**L** 7-10	Conine, Brett (3-2)	**Hooper, Justin (1-1)**	None	2,088	19-19	9-9
Apr 29	at Utah		Smith's Ballpark • Salt Lake City, UT	**L** 4-6	Rose, Jayson (6-4)	**Canning, Griffin (5-5**	Drachler, Dylan (6)	783	19-20	9-10
Apr 30	at Utah		Smith's Ballpark • Salt Lake City, UT	**L** 4-9	Carroll, Dalton (4-5)	**Dyer, Grant (2-3)**	None	995	19-21	9-11

May
Date	Opponent	Rank	Site/stadium	Score	Win	Loss	Save	Attendance	Overall record	Pac-12 Record
May 1	at Utah		Smith's Ballpark • Salt Lake City, UT	**W** 10-3	**Molnar, Kyle (4-4)**	Lapiana, Josh (2-5)	Ceja, Moises (3)	977	20-21	10-11
May 3	at Long Beach State*		Blair Field • Long Beach, CA	**W** 11-10	**Hadley, Nathan (1-0)**	Hughey, Jacob (0-2)	Ceja, Moises (4)	1,426	21-21	10-11
May 6	UC Irvine*		Jackie Robinson Stadium • Los Angeles, CA	**L** 2-4	Ritchey (2-2)	**Ceja, Moises (2-1)**	Faucher (8)	909	21-22	10-11
May 7	at UC Irvine*		Anteater Ballpark • Irvine, CA	**W** 4-1	**Dyer, Grant (3-3)**	Bishop (5-4)	None	1,002	22-22	10-11
May 8	UC Irvine*		Jackie Robinson Stadium • Los Angeles, CA	**W** 5-1	**Molnar, Kyle (5-4)**	Garcia (4-4)	None	1,016	23-22	10-11
May 10	Pepperdine*		Jackie Robinson Stadium • Los Angeles, CA	**L** 1-4	Green, Max (3-0)	**Bird, Jake (1-4)**	Wilson, Ryan (6)	443	23-23	10-11
May 13	Southern California		Jackie Robinson Stadium • Los Angeles, CA	**L** 3-5	Navilhon, Joe (5-3)	**Canning, Griffin (5-6)**	Huberman, Marc (3)	2,041	23-24	10-12
May 14	Southern California		Jackie Robinson Stadium • Los Angeles, CA	**W** 4-3	**Burke, Scott (2-2)**	Davis, Kyle (4-8)	Virant, Hunter (1)	1,898	24-24	11-12
May 15	Southern California		Jackie Robinson Stadium • Los Angeles, CA	**L** 0-9	Hart, Mitch (1-3)	**Molnar, Kyle (5-5)**	None	2,033	24-25	11-13
May 17	UC Santa Barbara*		Jackie Robinson Stadium • Los Angeles, CA	**L** 3-4	Kelly, J (1-0)	**Forbes, Tucker (1-2)**	Nelson, K (7)	804	24-26	11-13
May 20	Arizona State		Jackie Robinson Stadium • Los Angeles, CA	**L** 4-12	Martinez, Seth (9-3)	**Canning, Griffin (5-7)**	None	1,051	24-27	11-14
May 21	Arizona State		Jackie Robinson Stadium • Los Angeles, CA	**W** 13-2	**Dyer, Grant (4-3)**	Lingos, Eli (3-4)	None	1,298	25-27	12-14
May 22	Arizona State		Jackie Robinson Stadium • Los Angeles, CA	**L** 4-10	Aboites, Jordan (6-1)	**Bird, Jake (1-5)**	Erives, Eder (9)	1,843	25-28	12-15
May 27	at Oregon State		Goss Stadium at Coleman Field • Corvallis, OR	**L** 0-1	Engelbrekt (3-3)	**Canning, Griffin (5-8)**	None	2,805	25-29	12-16
May 28	at Oregon State		Goss Stadium at Coleman Field • Corvallis, OR	**L** 0-3	Fehmel (10-1)	**Dyer, Grant (4-4)**	None	3,258	25-30	12-17
May 29	at Oregon State		Goss Stadium at Coleman Field • Corvallis, OR	**L** 0-6	Heimlich (7-4)	**Bird, Jake (1-6)**	None	3,043	25-31	12-18

Rankings from Collegiate Baseball; parenthesis indicate tournament seedings.

== Ranking movements ==
Ranking movements Legend: ██ Increase in ranking ██ Decrease in ranking — = Not ranked
	Week																		
Poll	Pre	1	2	3	4	5	6	7	8	9	10	11	12	13	14	15	16	17	Final
Coaches'	9	9*	19	—	23	—	—	—	—	—	—	—	—	—	—	—	—	—	—
Baseball America	10	15	14	14	14	14	—	—	—	—	—	—	—	—	—	—	—	—	—
Collegiate Baseball^	10	14	21	23	30	25	—	—	—	—	—	—	—	—	—	—	—	—	—
NCBWA†	9	15	20	19	23	21	29	—	—	—	—	—	—	—	—	—	—	—	—

^ Collegiate Baseball ranked 40 teams in their preseason poll, but only ranked 30 teams weekly during the season.
† NCBWA ranks 30 teams in their preseason poll, but only ranks 25 teams weekly during the season.
* A new poll was not released for this week, so for comparison purposes, the previous week's ranking is inserted in this week's slot.
