= 2016 Horizon League baseball tournament =

- Teams: 6
- Format: Modified double-elimination
- Finals site: Nischwitz Stadium; Fairborn, Ohio
- Champions: Wright State (5th title)
- Winning coach: Greg Lovelady (2nd title)

2016 Horizon League baseball standings
	Conf.				Overall
Team	W		L	PCT	W		L	PCT
Wright State ‍†‍‡‍^{y}	23	–	6	.793	45	–	16	.738
Milwaukee ‍‍‍	17	–	11	.607	32	–	26	.552
Valparaiso ‍‍‍	17	–	12	.586	30	–	28	.517
UIC ‍‍‍	15	–	12	.556	25	–	30	.455
Oakland ‍‍‍	11	–	14	.440	23	–	27	.460
Northern Kentucky ‍‍‍	9	–	21	.300	20	–	34	.370
Youngstown State ‍‍‍	5	–	21	.192	14	–	38	.269
† – Conference champion ‡ – Tournament champion y – Invited to the NCAA tournament As of June 4, 2016; Rankings from Collegiate Baseball

The 2016 Horizon League baseball tournament was held from May 25 through 28. The top six finishers of the league's seven teams met in the double-elimination tournament held at the home field of the regular season champion. The winner of the tournament earned the conference's automatic bid to the 2016 NCAA Division I baseball tournament.

== Seeding and format ==
The league's teams were seeded one through six based on winning percentage, using conference games only. They then played a double-elimination tournament. The teams seeded three through six played in play-in games. The winners of those games joined seeds one and two to play a double-elimination tournament. The seventh place team did not qualify for the tournament.

Team	W	L	Pct	GB	Seed
Wright State	23	6	.793	—	1
Milwaukee	17	11	.607	5.5	2
Valparaiso	17	12	.586	6	3
UIC	15	12	.556	7	4
Oakland	11	14	.440	10	5
Northern Kentucky	9	21	.300	14.5	6
Youngstown State	5	21	.192	16.5	—

== Bracket ==
=== Play-in games ===
Wednesday, May 25
Team	R
#3 Valparaiso	10
#6 Northern Kentucky	7

Wednesday, May 25
Team	R
#4 UIC	10
#5 Oakland	9

=== Remaining bracket ===
First round
1	Wright State	11
4	UIC	3
3	Valparaiso	6
2	Milwaukee	9
Lower round 1
3	Valparaiso	4
4	UIC	2

Semi-finals
1	Wright State	5
2	Milwaukee	1
Lower final
2	Milwaukee	7
3	Valparaiso	12

Finals
1	Wright State
3	Valparaiso
