= Ryan Aguilar =

American baseball player (born 1994)

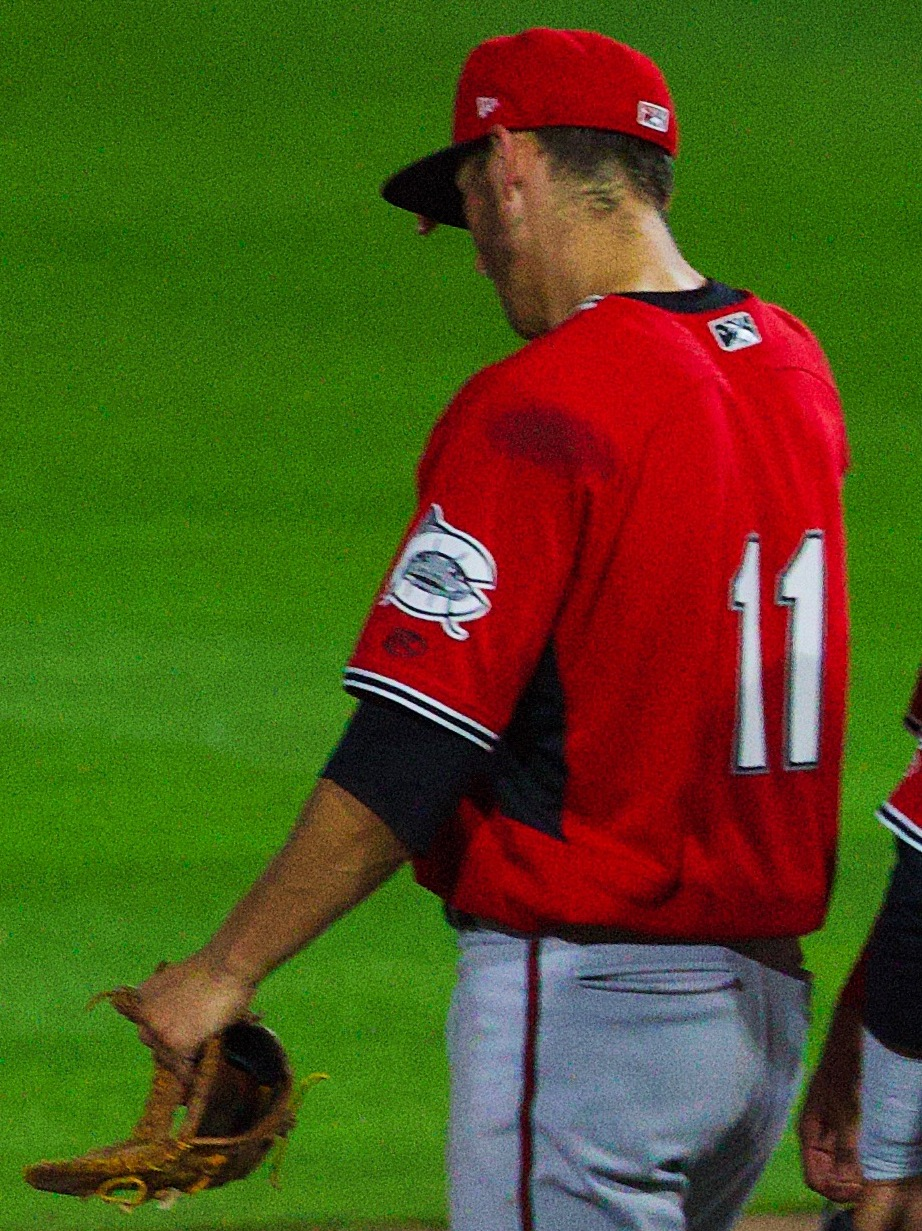
- Aguilar with the Carolina Mudcats in 2019

Tecolotes de los Dos Laredos – No. 11
- Outfielder
- Born: September 11, 1994 (age 32); Yorba Linda, California, U.S.
- Bats: Right Throws: Right

MLB debut
- August 26, 2022, for the Los Angeles Angels

MLB statistics (through 2022 season)
- Batting average: .136
- Home runs: 0
- Runs batted in: 2
- Stats at Baseball Reference

Teams
- Los Angeles Angels (2022)

Ryan Scott Aguilar (born September 11, 1994) is an American professional baseball outfielder for the Tecolotes de los Dos Laredos of the Mexican League. He has previously played in Major League Baseball (MLB) for the Los Angeles Angels. After playing college baseball for the University of Arizona, he was drafted by the Milwaukee Brewers in the 31st round of the 2016 MLB draft.

== Early life ==
Aguilar was born in Yorba Linda, California, on September 11, 1994. He grew up in the Orange County region and frequently went to Angels games, meeting Reggie Jackson during the 2002 American League Division Series. He attended Esperanza High School in Anaheim, California. After high school, Aguilar played his first two seasons of college baseball at Santa Ana College, where he was named to the All-Orange Empire Conference team as a sophomore. Aguilar transferred to the University of Arizona and joined the baseball team for the 2015 season. He posted a .190 batting average in 26 games in his first season with the Wildcats. In 2016, he batted .310 with 8 home runs, 56 runs batted in (RBI), and a .879 on-base plus slugging (OPS) in 73 games, all of which he started. He graduated from Arizona with a bachelor's degree in general studies, sports and society emphasis.

== Professional career ==
=== Milwaukee Brewers ===
Aguilar was drafted by the Milwaukee Brewers in the 31st round of the 2016 MLB draft. He was initially assigned to the Arizona League Brewers, where he batted .278 in 5 games. He was promoted to the Helena Brewers of the Pioneer League for the remainder of 2016, batting .248 with 11 doubles and a .735 OPS in 40 games. Aguilar spent the 2017 season with the Single–A Wisconsin Timber Rattlers of the Midwest League and batted .206 with 23 RBI in 105 games. In 2018, he was promoted to the High-A Carolina Mudcats of the Carolina League, batting .223 with 21 doubles and 56 RBI in 126 games. Aguilar spent most of 2019 with the Mudcats and batted .272 with 22 doubles and 47 RBI in 105 games and was then promoted to the Double-A Biloxi Shuckers of the Southern League, where batted .236 in 24 games.

Aguilar did not play in a game in 2020 due to the cancellation of the minor league season because of the COVID-19 pandemic. In 2021, Aguilar returned to Biloxi and posted a career-worst .146 batting average in 74 games. On August 16, 2021, the Brewers organization released Aguilar. He later said he thought his career was over when he was released by the team.

=== Los Angeles Angels ===
Aguilar signed a minor league contract with the Los Angeles Angels on December 15, 2021, and was assigned to the Double-A Rocket City Trash Pandas of the Southern League. In 88 games with Rocket City, he batted .280 with 15 home runs, 13 doubles, 48 RBI, and a .944 OPS.

On August 26, 2022, Aguilar had his contract selected by the Angels and made his debut against the Toronto Blue Jays at Rogers Centre. He went 0-for-2 with two walks and two runs scored. On August 27, he recorded his first career hit with a double off Alek Manoah but was thrown out while attempting to go to third base. On August 29, Aguilar was returned to Rocket City and promoted him to the Triple-A Salt Lake Bees of the Pacific Coast League the next day. On September 1, he was called back up to the major leagues. Aguilar was designated for assignment on September 9, outrighted to Salt Lake on September 11, and assigned to Rocket City on September 13. Aguilar finished his cup of coffee season batting .136 with two RBIs in seven games. On October 14, Aguilar re–signed with the Angels on a minor league contract.

During spring training in 2023, Aguilar missed time while tending to an oblique injury. He was assigned to Rocket City to begin the season and returned from his injury on April 11. After hitting .169 in 22 games, Aguilar was released by the Angels organization on June 19, 2023.

=== Tecolotes de los Dos Laredos ===
On July 13, 2023, Aguilar signed with the Tecolotes de los Dos Laredos of the Mexican League. In 15 games for Dos Laredos, he hit .177/.300/.265 with one home run and three RBI.

Aguilar made 63 appearances for Dos Laredos in 2024, hitting .211/.315/.337 with one home run, 12 RBI, and two stolen bases.

In 2025, Aguilar returned to the Laredos for a third season. In 55 games he hit .291/.339/.382 with 2 home runs, 14 RBIs and 4 stolen bases.

== Personal life ==
Aguilar's older brother, Shane, played college baseball for Cypress College in Cypress, California.
