= 2016 Southern Conference baseball tournament =

- Teams: 9
- Format: Double-elimination tournament
- Finals site: Fluor Field at the West End; Greenville, SC

2016 Southern Conference baseball standings
	Conf.				Overall
Team	W		L	PCT	W		L	PCT
Mercer ‍†‍‍	16	–	8	.667	38	–	23	.623
Western Carolina ‍‍‡‍^{y}	15	–	9	.625	31	–	31	.500
UNC Greensboro ‍‍‍	15	–	9	.625	38	–	21	.644
Furman ‍‍‍	14	–	10	.583	29	–	30	.492
Samford ‍‍‍	13	–	11	.542	35	–	26	.574
East Tennessee State ‍‍‍	13	–	11	.542	27	–	30	.474
Wofford ‍‍‍	12	–	12	.500	30	–	28	.517
The Citadel ‍‍‍	6	–	18	.250	17	–	42	.288
VMI ‍‍‍	4	–	20	.167	21	–	35	.375
† – Conference champion ‡ – Tournament champion y – Invited to the NCAA tournament As of June 11, 2016; Rankings from Collegiate Baseball

The 2016 Southern Conference baseball tournament was held from May 24 through 29 at Fluor Field at the West End in Greenville, South Carolina. Western Carolina University won the tournament. The annual event determines the conference champion of the Division I Southern Conference in college baseball. The tournament winner earns the league's bid to the 2016 NCAA Division I baseball tournament. This is the last of 20 athletic championships held by the conference in the 2015–16 academic year.

The tournament was originally held from 1950–53, when the Southern Conference was a large conference composed of several small schools and several large schools, the latter of which would form the Atlantic Coast Conference after the 1953 season. The event was re-established in 1984 and has been held every year since. Western Carolina has claimed nine championships, the most of any school, with The Citadel close behind at eight tournament wins. Furman is the only other school current school with multiple championships, winning two. East Tennessee State, UNC Greensboro, and VMI have never won a title, although East Tennessee State and VMI returned to the conference in 2015 after over ten years in other conferences. Defending champion Mercer claimed the conference championship in its first ever appearance.

The tournament will be played in Greenville, which has hosted three of the past seven events.

== Seeding and format ==
All nine teams will participate in the tournament, with the bottom two seeds playing a single-elimination play-in round. The winner will play the top seed, as part of the double-elimination tournament.

Team	W	L	Pct	GB	Seed
Mercer	16	8	.667	—	1
Western Carolina	15	9	.625	1	2
UNC Greensboro	15	9	.625	1	3
Furman	14	10	.583	2	4
East Tennessee State	13	11	.542	3	5
Samford	13	11	.542	3	6
Wofford	12	12	.500	4	7
The Citadel	6	18	.250	10	8
VMI	4	20	.167	12	9

== Bracket ==
=== Play-In Round ===
Tuesday, May 24
Team	R
#9 VMI	2
#8 The Citadel	3

=== Bracket ===
Upper round 1	Upper round 2	Upper final	Final
1	Mercer	13
8	The Citadel	1
1	Mercer	6
4	Furman	1
4	Furman	3
5	East Tennessee State	0
1	Mercer	9
2	Western Carolina	8
3	UNC Greensboro	5
6	Samford	8
6	Samford	4
2	Western Carolina	14
2	Western Carolina	10
7	Wofford	9	1	Mercer	2	2
2	Western Carolina	4	3
Lower round 1	Lower round 2	Lower round 3	Lower final
5	East Tennessee State	11
8	The Citadel	2	6	Samford	12	6	Samford	4
5	East Tennessee State	4	6	Samford	2	2	Western Carolina	7
4	Furman	0
3	UNC Greensboro	10
3	UNC Greensboro	9	4	Furman	15
7	Wofford	6
