= Jon Duplantier =

American baseball player (born 1994)

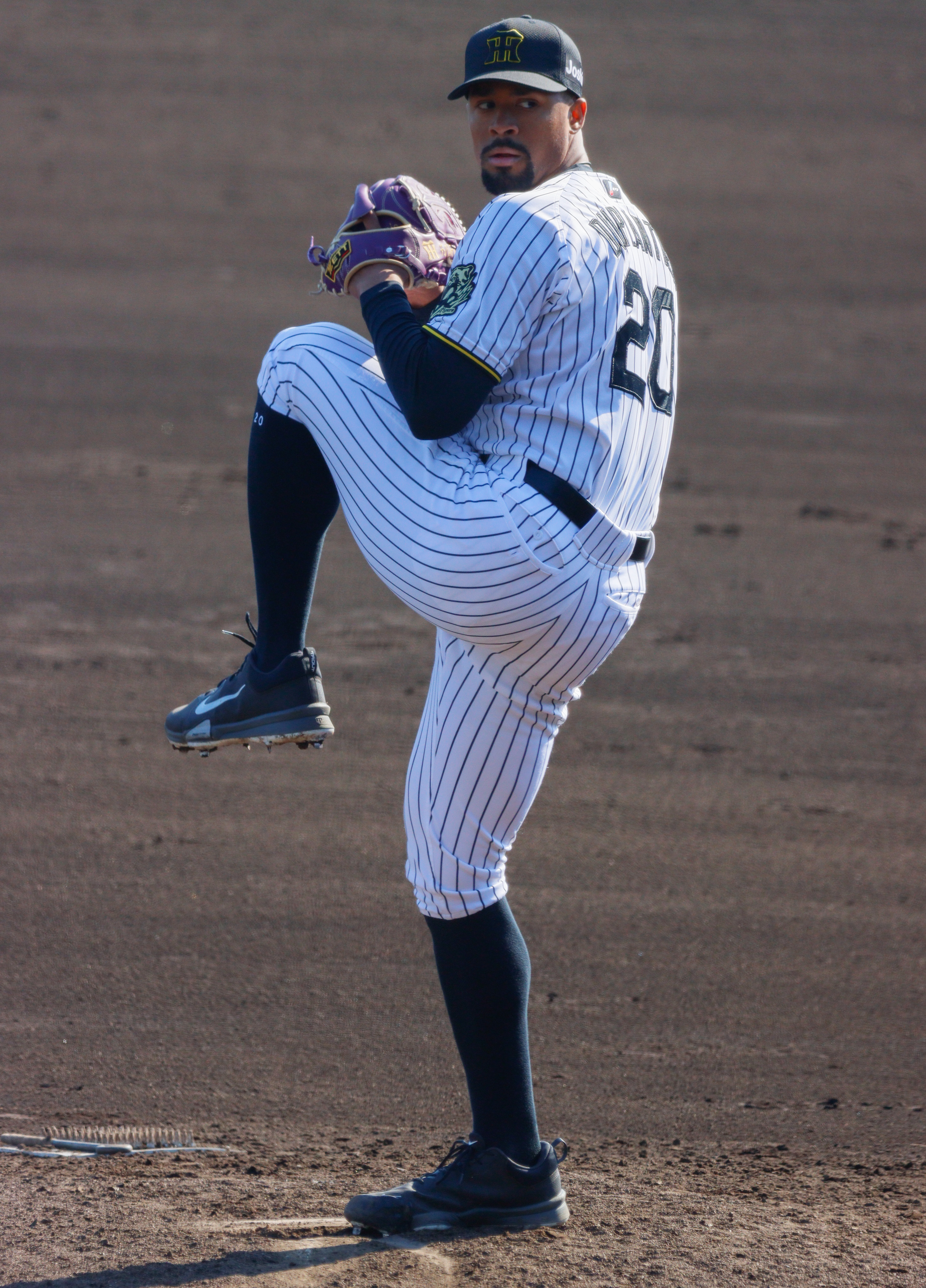
- Duplantier with the Hanshin Tigers in 2025

Free agent
- Pitcher
- Born: July 11, 1994 (age 32); Newark, Delaware, U.S.
- Bats: Left Throws: Right

Professional debut
- MLB: April 1, 2019, for the Arizona Diamondbacks
- NPB: April 11, 2025, for the Hanshin Tigers

MLB statistics (through 2021 season)
- Win–loss record: 1–4
- Earned run average: 6.70
- Strikeouts: 46

NPB statistics (through July 30, 2026)
- Win–loss record: 6–5
- Earned run average: 1.54
- Strikeouts: 119
- Stats at Baseball Reference

Teams
- Arizona Diamondbacks (2019, 2021); Hanshin Tigers (2025); Yokohama DeNA BayStars (2026)

Jon Christopher Duplantier (born July 11, 1994) is an American professional baseball pitcher who is a free agent. He has previously played in Major League Baseball (MLB) for the Arizona Diamondbacks, and in NPB for the Hanshin Tigers and the Yokohama DeNA BayStars. The Diamondbacks selected Duplantier in the third round of the 2016 MLB draft.

== Career ==
=== Amateur career ===
Duplantier attended Seven Lakes High School in Katy, Texas, and Rice University. He played college baseball for the Rice Owls. After missing the 2015 season due to a shoulder injury, Duplantier returned in 2016, and was named the Conference USA Pitcher of the Year.

=== Arizona Diamondbacks ===
The Arizona Diamondbacks selected Duplantier in the third round of the 2016 Major League Baseball draft. He made his professional debut with the Hillsboro Hops in June 2016, and pitched one inning there, striking out the side. He started 2017 with the Kane County Cougars and was later promoted to the Visalia Rawhide, posting a combined 12–3 record with a 1.39 ERA in 25 games, including 24 starts between both teams. He played in the 2017 All-Star Futures Game. MLB Pipeline named him their Pipeline Pitcher of the Year.

Duplantier spent the 2018 season pitching for the Jackson Generals. In 14 starts, he went 5–1 with a 2.55 ERA.

On April 1, 2019, Duplantier was called up to the major leagues for the first time, and made his major league debut. He recorded three scoreless innings in relief and earned a save. He finished the season with a 1–1 record in 15 games (three starts). Duplantier did not appear in a game with Arizona in 2020 and did not play in a minor league game due to the cancellation of the minor league season because of the COVID-19 pandemic.

Duplantier was assigned to the Triple-A Reno Aces to begin the 2021 season. He struggled to a 7.78 ERA in four games between Reno and the rookie-level Arizona League Diamondbacks, and fared worse in the majors, struggling to a 13.15 ERA with 12 strikeouts in 13 innings over four appearances. While pitching in the minor leagues, Duplantier suffered a season-ending lat strain. Since injured players cannot be placed on outright waivers, the Diamondbacks released Duplantier on July 27, 2021. On July 31, the Diamondbacks re-signed Duplantier to a minor league contract. He elected minor league free agency following the season.

=== Los Angeles Dodgers ===
On December 4, 2021, the San Francisco Giants signed Duplianter to minor league contract. On December 8, the Los Angeles Dodgers selected Duplantier from the Giants in the minor league phase of the Rule 5 draft. He appeared in 34 games (14 starts) for the Triple-A Oklahoma City Dodgers during the 2022 season, with a 5–3 record and 4.80 ERA. Duplantier elected free agency following the season on November 10, 2022.

=== Philadelphia Phillies ===
On January 6, 2023, Duplantier signed a minor league contract with the Philadelphia Phillies organization. He made 3 starts for their Class-A Advanced affiliate, registering an 8.38 ERA with 12 strikeouts in 9 2/3 innings pitched. On June 17, Duplantier was released by the Phillies.

=== New York Mets ===
On February 29, 2024, Duplantier signed a minor league contract with the New York Mets. In 16 games for the Triple–A Syracuse Mets, he posted a 5.31 ERA with 22 strikeouts across 20 1/3 innings pitched. On June 13, Duplantier was released by the Mets organization.

=== Lake Country DockHounds ===
On July 11, 2024, Duplantier signed with the Lake Country DockHounds of the American Association of Professional Baseball. He made four starts for them, pitching 18 innings without allowing an earned run.

=== Los Angeles Dodgers (second stint) ===
On August 5, 2024, Duplantier signed a minor league contract with the Los Angeles Dodgers. He made one start for the Double–A Tulsa Drillers and six for the Triple–A Oklahoma City Baseball Club, where he had a 3–2 record and 3.56 ERA in 30 1/3 innings. In his final start of the season, against the Salt Lake Bees, on September 18, Duplantier struck out a career–high 12 batters in six perfect innings. He elected free agency following the season on November 4.

=== Hanshin Tigers ===
On November 25, 2024, Duplantier signed a minor league contract with the Milwaukee Brewers. He was released by the organization on December 16 and signed with the Hanshin Tigers of Nippon Professional Baseball the same day. Duplantier made 15 appearances for Hanshin in 2025, compiling a 6–3 record and 1.39 ERA with 113 strikeouts across 90 2/3 innings pitched. On December 2, 2025, Duplantier and the Tigers parted ways.

=== Yokohama DeNA BayStars ===
On December 16, 2025, despite previous reports that he had agreed to a deal with the Fukuoka SoftBank Hawks, Duplantier elected to sign with the Yokohama DeNA BayStars of Nippon Professional Baseball. Duplantier made 2 starts for the BayStars, going 0–2 with a 3.00 ERA. On July 10, Duplantier underwent elbow surgery and was waived by the team. On July 17, Duplantier was officially released by the BayStars.

== See also ==
- Rule 5 draft results
