= 2016 Sun Belt Conference baseball tournament =

- Teams: 8
- Format: Double-elimination
- Finals site: Bobcat Ballpark; San Marcos, TX
- Champions: Louisiana–Lafayette (4th title)

2016 Sun Belt Conference baseball standings
	Conf.				Overall
Team	W		L	PCT	W		L	PCT
No. 19 Louisiana–Lafayette †‡^{y} ‍‍‍	21	–	9	.700	43	–	21	.672
No. 26 South Alabama ‍†‍‍^{y}	21	–	9	.700	42	–	22	.656
Little Rock ‍‍‍	17	–	13	.567	26	–	28	.481
Troy ‍‍‍	17	–	13	.567	32	–	26	.552
Texas State ‍‍‍	16	–	14	.533	31	–	28	.525
Georgia Southern ‍‍‍	16	–	14	.533	36	–	24	.600
UT Arlington ‍‍‍	15	–	15	.500	30	–	28	.517
Arkansas State ‍‍‍	13	–	17	.433	29	–	29	.500
Louisiana–Monroe ‍‍‍	10	–	20	.333	20	–	35	.364
Georgia State ‍‍‍	10	–	20	.333	24	–	31	.436
Appalachian State ‍‍‍	9	–	21	.300	18	–	36	.333
† – Conference champion ‡ – Tournament champion y – Invited to the NCAA tournament As of June 11, 2016; Rankings from Collegiate Baseball

The 2016 Sun Belt Conference baseball tournament was held at Bobcat Ballpark on the campus of the Texas State University in San Marcos, Texas, from May 25 to May 29, 2015. The tournament used a double-elimination format. The winner of the tournament earned Sun Belt Conference's automatic bid to the 2016 NCAA Division I baseball tournament.

== Seeding ==
The top eight teams (based on conference results) from the conference earn invites to the tournament. The teams will be seeded based on conference winning percentage, and will then play a two bracket, double-elimination tournament. The winner of each bracket will play a championship final.

Team	W	L	Pct	GB	Seed
Louisiana–Lafayette	21	9	.700	—	1
South Alabama	21	9	.700	—	2
Arkansas–Little Rock	17	13	.567	4	3
Troy	17	13	.567	4	4
Texas State	16	14	.533	5	5
Georgia Southern	16	14	.533	5	6
Texas–Arlington	15	15	.500	6	7
Arkansas State	13	17	.433	8	8
Louisiana–Monroe	10	20	.333	11	—
Georgia State	10	20	.333	11	—
Appalachian State	9	21	.300	12	—

== Results ==
First round
1	Louisiana–Lafayette	7
8	Arkansas State	4
4	Troy	6
5	Texas State	11
8	Arkansas State	13
4	Troy	12
3	Arkansas–Little Rock	4
6	Georgia Southern	13
2	South Alabama	2
7	Texas–Arlington	4
3	Arkansas–Little Rock	4
2	South Alabama	6

Second round
1	Louisiana–Lafayette	4
5	Texas State	2
8	Arkansas State	4
5	Texas State	3
6	Georgia Southern	6
7	Texas–Arlington	0
7	Texas-Arlington	0
2	South Alabama	3

Semifinals
1	Louisiana–Lafayette	17	—
8	Arkansas State	10	—
6	Georgia Southern	4	—
2	South Alabama	0	—

Final
1	Louisiana-Lafayette	5
6	Georgia Southern	0
