= 2016 Georgia State Panthers baseball team =

American college baseball season

2016 Georgia State Panthers baseball
- Conference: Sun Belt Conference
- Record: 24–31 (10–20 SBC)
- Head coach: Greg Frady (9th season)
- Home stadium: GSU Baseball Complex

2016 Sun Belt Conference baseball standings
	Conf.				Overall
Team	W		L	PCT	W		L	PCT
No. 19 Louisiana–Lafayette †‡^{y} ‍‍‍	21	–	9	.700	43	–	21	.672
No. 26 South Alabama ‍†‍‍^{y}	21	–	9	.700	42	–	22	.656
Little Rock ‍‍‍	17	–	13	.567	26	–	28	.481
Troy ‍‍‍	17	–	13	.567	32	–	26	.552
Texas State ‍‍‍	16	–	14	.533	31	–	28	.525
Georgia Southern ‍‍‍	16	–	14	.533	36	–	24	.600
UT Arlington ‍‍‍	15	–	15	.500	30	–	28	.517
Arkansas State ‍‍‍	13	–	17	.433	29	–	29	.500
Louisiana–Monroe ‍‍‍	10	–	20	.333	20	–	35	.364
Georgia State ‍‍‍	10	–	20	.333	24	–	31	.436
Appalachian State ‍‍‍	9	–	21	.300	18	–	36	.333
† – Conference champion ‡ – Tournament champion y – Invited to the NCAA tournament As of June 11, 2016; Rankings from Collegiate Baseball

The 2016 Georgia State Panthers baseball team represented Georgia State University in the 2016 NCAA Division I baseball season. The Panthers played their home games at the GSU Baseball Complex.

== Personnel ==
=== 2016 roster ===
2016 Georgia State Panthers roster
Pitchers: 11 Brandon Baker – Junior; 13 Garrett Ford – Senior; 17 Tyler Elwer – Junior; 21 Chris Mejias – Freshman; 23 Logan Barnette – Sophomore; 26 Wayne Wages – Senior; 27 Dillon Swaggerty – (redshirt) Junior; 28 Bryan White – (redshirt) Sophomore; 29 Bryce Conley – Junior; 31 Devin Vainer – Junior; 32 Clayton Payne – Senior; 33 Alex Hegner – (redshirt) Senior; 35 Will White – Sophomore; 38 Marc-André Habeck – Senior; 40 Liam Henry – (redshirt) Freshman'; 49 Cole Uvila – Senior	Catchers: 5 Nich Gatewood – Freshman; 8 Joey Roach – Senior; 18 Brandon Gozalez – Junior; 25 Zach Wingate – Junior; 47 Evan Leyva – Senior; Infielders: 1 Justin Jones – Sophomore; 3 Andy Burnett – (redshirt) Freshman; 6 Lucas Boudreau – Freshman; 14 Isreal Zackery – Freshman; 15 Will Kilgore – Sophomore; 20 Jarrett Hood – Junior; 22 Same Few – (redshirt) Senior; 24 Darius Sewell – Freshman; 34 Jack Thompson – Sophomore	Outfielders: 2 Rhett Harper – Sophomore; 4 James Clements – Senior; 7 Jaylen Woullard – Junior; 9 Will Johnson – Sophomore; 12 Luke Leonard – (redshirt) Freshman; 16 Ryan Blanton – Junior; 19 Cam Sperry – Senior

=== Coaching staff ===
2016 Georgia State Panthers baseball coaching staff
- 10 Greg Frady – Head coach – 9th year
- NA Adam Scott – Assistant coach/Pitching coach – 2nd year
- NA Adam Pavkovich – Assistant coach/Recruiting coordinator – 1st year
- NA Brock Bennett – Assistant coach

== Schedule ==
2016 Georgia State Panthers baseball game log
Regular season
February

#	Date	Opponent	Venue	Score	Overall Record	SBC Record
1	February 19	Western Michigan	GSU Baseball Complex	3–2	1–0	–
2	February 20	VCU	GSU Baseball Complex	6–8	1–1	–
3	February 21	Perdue	GSU Baseball Complex	3–5	1–2	–
4	February 26	Coppin State	GSU Baseball Complex	22–4	2–2	–
5	February 27	Coppin State	GSU Baseball Complex	17–0	3–2	–
6	February 27	Coppin State	GSU Baseball Complex	12–0	4–2	–
7	February 28	Coppin State	GSU Baseball Complex	13–0	5–2	–

March

#	Date	Opponent	Venue	Score	Overall Record	SBC Record
8	March 1	Georgia Tech	Atlanta, GA	6–11	5–3	–
9	March 4	Minnesota	GSU Baseball Complex	0–3	5–4	–
10	March 5	Minnesota	GSU Baseball Complex	4–3	6–4	–
11	March 6	Minnesota	GSU Baseball Complex	6–11	6–5	–
12	March 8	Mercer	GSU Baseball Complex	4–3	7–5	–
13	March 12	Fairmont State	GSU Baseball Complex	1–2	7–6	–
14	March 12	Fairmont State	GSU Baseball Complex	8–5	8–6	–
15	March 13	Jackson State	GSU Baseball Complex	12–13	8–7	–
16	March 14	Jackson State	GSU Baseball Complex	11–5	9–7	–
17	March 15	Savannah State	GSU Baseball Complex	6–10	9–8	–
18	March 18	Arkansas State	GSU Baseball Complex	1–11	9–9	0–1
19	March 19	Arkansas State	GSU Baseball Complex	5–4	10–9	1–1
20	March 21	Arkansas State	GSU Baseball Complex	14–6	11–9	2–1
21	March 22	Savannah State	GSU Baseball Complex	4–1	12–9	2–1
22	March 24	Louisiana–Lafayette	Lafayette, LA	2–4	12–10	2–2
23	March 25	Louisiana–Lafayette	Lafayette, LA	1–7	12–11	2–3
24	March 26	Louisiana–Lafayette	Lafayette, LA	2–4	12–12	2–4
25	March 30	Mercer	Macon, GA	10–6	13–12	2–4

April

#	Date	Opponent	Venue	Score	Overall Record	SBC Record
26	April 1	Texas-Arlington	GSU Baseball Complex	5–9	13–13	2–5
27	April 2	Texas-Arlington	GSU Baseball Complex	16–18	13–14	2–6
28	April 3	Texas-Arlington	GSU Baseball Complex	8–7	14–14	3–6
29	April 5	Auburn	Auburn, AL	4–7	14–15	3–6
30	April 8	Arkansas–Little Rock	Little Rock, AR	7–5	15–15	4–6
31	April 9	Arkansas–Little Rock	Little Rock, AR	2–15	15–16	4–7
32	April 10	Arkansas–Little Rock	Little Rock, AR	7–9	15–17	4–8
33	April 12	USC Upstate	GSU Baseball Complex	Cancelled	–	–
34	April 15	Louisiana-Monroe	Monroe, LA	7–3	16–17	5–8
35	April 16	Louisiana-Monroe	Monroe, LA	0–14	16–18	5–9
36	April 17	Louisiana-Monroe	Monroe, LA	3–5	16–19	5–10
37	April 20	Georgia Tech	GSU Baseball Complex	5–11	16–20	5–10
38	April 22	Appalachian State	GSU Baseball Complex	10–0	17–20	6–10
39	April 23	Appalachian State	GSU Baseball Complex	5–6	17–21	6–11
40	April 24	Appalachian State	GSU Baseball Complex	5–4	18–21	7–11
41	April 27	Kennesaw State	GSU Baseball Complex	4–3	19–21	7–11
42	April 29	South Alabama	GSU Baseball Complex	3–9	19–22	7–12
43	April 30	South Alabama	GSU Baseball Complex	7–4	20–22	8–12

May

#	Date	Opponent	Venue	Score	Overall Record	SBC Record
44	May 1	South Alabama	GSU Baseball Complex	1–2	20–23	8–13
45	May 3	Alabama A&M	GSU Baseball Complex	13–5	21–23	8–13
46	May 4	Alabama A&M	GSU Baseball Complex	8–7	22–23	8–13
47	May 6	Texas State	San Marcos, TX	2–6	22–24	8–14
48	May 7	Texas State	San Marcos, TX	1–10	22–25	8–15
49	May 8	Texas State	San Marcos, TX	10–9	23–25	9–15
50	May 10	Kennesaw State	Kennesaw, GA	2–3	23–26	9–15
51	May 13	Troy	GSU Baseball Complex	2–4	23–27	9–16
52	May 14	Troy	GSU Baseball Complex	3–9	23–28	9–17
53	May 15	Troy	GSU Baseball Complex	3–16	23–29	9–18
54	May 19	Georgia Southern	Statesboro, GA	6–0	23–30	9–19
55	May 20	Georgia Southern	Statesboro, GA	5–4	24–30	10–19
56	May 21	Georgia Southern	Statesboro, GA	5–1	24–31	10–20
