= 2016 Louisiana–Lafayette Ragin' Cajuns baseball team =

American college baseball season

2016 Louisiana–Lafayette Ragin' Cajuns baseball

Sun Belt Conference Regular season Co-champions Sun Belt Conference Tournament champions Lafayette Regionals Appearance
- Conference: Sun Belt Conference

Ranking
- Coaches: No. 19
- Record: 43-21 (21-9 SBC)
- Head coach: Tony Robichaux (22nd season)
- Assistant coaches: Anthony Babineaux; Jeremy Talbot
- Home stadium: M. L. Tigue Moore Field

2016 Sun Belt Conference baseball standings
	Conf.				Overall
Team	W		L	PCT	W		L	PCT
No. 19 Louisiana–Lafayette †‡^{y} ‍‍‍	21	–	9	.700	43	–	21	.672
No. 26 South Alabama ‍†‍‍^{y}	21	–	9	.700	42	–	22	.656
Little Rock ‍‍‍	17	–	13	.567	26	–	28	.481
Troy ‍‍‍	17	–	13	.567	32	–	26	.552
Texas State ‍‍‍	16	–	14	.533	31	–	28	.525
Georgia Southern ‍‍‍	16	–	14	.533	36	–	24	.600
UT Arlington ‍‍‍	15	–	15	.500	30	–	28	.517
Arkansas State ‍‍‍	13	–	17	.433	29	–	29	.500
Louisiana–Monroe ‍‍‍	10	–	20	.333	20	–	35	.364
Georgia State ‍‍‍	10	–	20	.333	24	–	31	.436
Appalachian State ‍‍‍	9	–	21	.300	18	–	36	.333
† – Conference champion ‡ – Tournament champion y – Invited to the NCAA tournament As of June 11, 2016; Rankings from Collegiate Baseball

The 2016 Louisiana–Lafayette Ragin' Cajuns baseball team represented the University of Louisiana at Lafayette in the 2016 NCAA Division I baseball season. The Ragin' Cajuns played their home games at M. L. Tigue Moore Field and were led by twenty-second year head coach Tony Robichaux.

== Preseason ==
=== Sun Belt Conference Coaches Poll ===
The Sun Belt Conference Coaches Poll was released on February 2, 2016. Louisiana-Lafayette was picked to finish first in the Sun Belt with 117 votes and 8 first-place votes.

Coaches poll
Predicted finish	Team	Votes (1st place)
1	Louisiana-Lafayette	117 (8)
2	South Alabama	111 (3)
3	Texas State	88
4	Troy	81
5	Georgia Southern	76
6	Georgia State	63
7	UT Arlington	57
8	Arkansas State	50
9	Little Rock	35
10	Louisiana-Monroe	29
11	Appalachian State	19

=== Preseason All-Sun Belt team ===
- Evan Challenger (GASO, R-JR, Pitcher)
- Gunner Leger (ULL, SO, Pitcher)
- Kevin Hill (USA, R-SR, Pitcher)
- Dylan Moore (ULL, SO, Pitcher)
- Joey Roach (GSU, SR, Catcher)
- Tanner Hill (TXST, SR, 1st Base)
- Stefan Trosclair (ULL, SR, 2nd Base)
- Justin Jones (GSU, SO, Shortstop)
- Tanner Ring (ARST, SR, 3rd Base)
- Ryan Blanton (GSU, JR, Outfield)
- Kyle Clement (ULL, SR, Outfield)
- Cole Billingsley (USA, R-JR, Outfield)
- Danny Martinez (USA, SR, Designated Hitter)
- Cory Geisler (TXST, SR, Utility)

== Roster ==
2016 Louisiana-Lafayette Ragin' Cajuns roster
Pitchers: 18 Evan Guillory - Sophomore; 24 Eric Carter - Senior; 26 Jevin Huval - Redshirt Junior; 27 Nick Zaunbrecher - Senior; 29 Chris Charpentier - Junior; 30 Hogan Harris - Freshman; 31 Wyatt Marks - Sophomore; 32 Logan Stoelke - Sophomore; 34 Will Bacon - Senior; 38 Trent Cormier - Junior; 39 Donald Comeaux - Freshman; 40 Dylan Moore - Sophomore; 41 Reagan Bazar - Junior; 43 Jacob Norman - Freshman; 45 Jack Burk - Freshman; 46 Nick Lee - Freshman; Catchers: 1 Ryne Ray - Freshman; 6 Nick Thurman - Senior; 15 Blake Talbot - Sophomore	Infielders: 4 Dylon Poncho - Freshman; 10 Brad Antchak - Junior; 11 Alex Pinero - Junior; 12 Joe Robbins - Junior; 13 Brenn Conrad - Junior; 14 Kennon Fontenot - Sophomore; 17 Gunner Leger - Sophomore; 19 Hunter Kasuls - Freshman; 22 Steven Sensley - Sophomore; 23 Stefan Trosclair - Senior; 42 Jake Wharton - Freshman; 44 Cameron Horton - Freshman; Outfielders: 2 Brian Mills - Senior; 7 Kyle Clement - Senior; 8 Derrek Herrington - Senior; 28 Johnny Rizer - Freshman; 33 Jamarius Williams - Sophomore; 35 Ishmael Edwards - Junior

=== Coaching staff ===
2016 Louisiana-Lafayette Ragin' Cajuns coaching staff
- Tony Robichaux – Head Coach – 22nd year
- Anthony Babineaux – Associate Head Coach – 22nd year
- Jeremy Talbot – Assistant Head Coach – 2nd year
- Daniel Freeman – Volunteer Assistant Coach – 2nd year
- Chris Domingue – Director of Baseball Operations – 14th year
- Greg Davis – Student Assistant
- Tyler Girouard – Manager
- Brian Covington – Clubhouse Manager
- Jacob Raggio – Clubhouse Manager
- Jeff Patton – Field Manager
- Connor Romero – Field Manager
- Victoria Stringer – Student Assistant

== Schedule and results ==
Louisiana–Lafayette announced its 2016 baseball schedule on September 15, 2015. The 2016 schedule consisted of 28 home and 28 away games in the regular season, including a trip to Houston to play in one of the toughest college baseball series, the Houston College Classic. The Ragin' Cajuns will host Sun Belts foes Little Rock, Georgia State, Texas State, Appalachian State, and Louisiana-Monroe and will travel to Troy, Arkansas State, Georgia State, UT Arlington, and South Alabama.

The 2016 Sun Belt Conference Championship was contested on May 25–29 in San Marcos, Texas, and was hosted by Texas State University.

Legend
	Louisiana-Lafayette win
	Louisiana-Lafayette loss
	Postponement
**Bold**	Louisiana-Lafayette team member

2016 Louisiana–Lafayette Ragin' Cajuns baseball game log
Regular season (37-19)

February (4-3)
Date	Opponent	Rank	Site/stadium	Score	Win	Loss	Save	TV	Attendance	Overall record	SBC record
Feb. 19	Sam Houston State	No. 6	M. L. Tigue Moore Field • Lafayette, LA	**W** 2-1 (10 inn)	**Moore** (1-0)	Manning (0-1)	None	Ragin' Cajuns Digital Network	4,473	1-0	
Feb. 20	Sam Houston State	No. 6	M. L. Tigue Moore Field • Lafayette, LA	**W** 6-2	**Marks** (1-0)	Nixon (0-1)	**Harris** (1)	Ragin' Cajuns Digital Network	4,646	2-0	
Feb. 21	Sam Houston State	No. 6	M. L. Tigue Moore Field • Lafayette, LA	**W** 13–3	**Carter** (1-0)	Brown (0-1)	None	MyAcadianaTV/ESPN3	4,400	3-0	
Feb. 24	at Louisiana Tech	No. 6	J. C. Love Field at Pat Patterson Park • Ruston, LA	**L** 2-6	Clancy (2-0)	**Guillory** (0-1)	None	None	2,095	3-1	
Houston College Classic
Feb. 26	vs. No. 13 TCU	No. 6	Minute Maid Park • Houston, TX	**L** 1-7	Howard (2-0)	**Leger** (0-1)	None	CST/ROOT Sports		3–2	
Feb. 27	vs. No. 23 Texas Tech	No. 6	Minute Maid Park • Houston, TX	**L** 3-5 (10 inn)	Shetter (1-0)	**Moore** (1-1)	None	CST/ROOT Sports		3–3	
Feb. 28	vs. No. 25 Rice	No. 6	Minute Maid Park • Houston, TX	**W** 4-2	**Lee** (1-0)	Fox (0-2)	**Huval** (1)	CST/ROOT Sports	6,516	4-3	

March (13-6)
Date	Opponent	Rank	Site/stadium	Score	Win	Loss	Save	TV	Attendance	Overall record	SBC record
Mar. 1	New Orleans	No. 16	M. L. Tigue Moore Field • Lafayette, LA	**W** 7-4	**Bacon** (1-0)	Leone (0-1)	**Moore** (1)	Ragin' Cajuns Digital Network	4,212	5–3	
Mar. 2	at McNeese State	No. 16	Joe Miller Ballpark • Lake Charles, LA	**L** 2-7	Sanders (1-1)	**Guillory** (0-2)	None	None	1,509	5-4	
Mar. 4	Sacred Heart	No. 16	M. L. Tigue Moore Field • Lafayette, LA	**W** 8-0	**Leger** (1-1)	Cooksey (0-2)	None	Ragin' Cajuns Digital Network	4,369	6–4	
Mar. 5	Sacred Heart	No. 16	M. L. Tigue Moore Field • Lafayette, LA	**W** 9-3	**Marks** (2-0)	Foley (0-1)	None	Ragin' Cajuns Digital Network	4,285	7-4	
Mar. 6	Sacred Heart	No. 16	M. L. Tigue Moore Field • Lafayette, LA	**W** 4-0	**Lee** (2-0)	Sostarich (0-1)	**Moore** (2)	Ragin' Cajuns Digital Network	4,265	8–4	
Mar. 8	at Tulane	No. 16	Greer Field at Turchin Stadium • New Orleans, LA	**L** 3-5	Simms (3-0)	**Huval** (0-1)	None	CST	2,247	8–5	
Mar. 11	at Troy	No. 16	Riddle-Pace Field • Troy, AL	**W** 4-2	**Huval** (1-1)	Childress (1-1)	**Moore** (3)	None	787	9–5	1-0
Mar. 12	at Troy	No. 16	Riddle-Pace Field • Troy, AL	**L** 1-4	Brown (3-1)	**Marks** (2-1)	None	None	774	9–6	1-1
Mar. 13	at Troy	No. 16	Riddle-Pace Field • Troy, AL	**W** 8-3	**Lee** (3-0)	Gill (0-1)	**Moore** (4)	None	798	10–6	2–1
Mar. 16	at Northwestern State	No. 16	H. Alvin Brown-C. C. Stroud Field • Natchitoches, LA	**W** 10-1	**Guillory** (1-2)	Winders (0-2)	None	None	784	11–6	
Mar. 19	Little Rock	No. 16	M. L. Tigue Moore Field • Lafayette, LA	**W** 15-4	**Leger** (2-1)	Slayton (0-1)	**Bacon** (1)	Ragin' Cajuns Digital Network	4,158	12–6	3–1
Mar. 19	Little Rock	No. 16	M. L. Tigue Moore Field • Lafayette, LA	**L** 5-10	Malcom (1-3)	**Marks** (2-2)	None	Ragin' Cajuns Digital Network	4,194	12–7	3-2
Mar. 20	Little Rock	No. 16	M. L. Tigue Moore Field • Lafayette, LA	**L** 1-7	Corbett (3-0)	**Lee** (3-1)	None	Ragin' Cajuns Digital Network	4,260	12–8	3-3
Wally Pontiff Classic
Mar. 22	vs. No. 10 LSU	No. 29	Zephyr Field • Metairie, LA	**L** 5-8	Cartwright (3-0)	**Guillory** (1-3)	None	CST	10,131	12–9	
Mar. 24	Georgia State	No. 29	M. L. Tigue Moore Field • Lafayette, LA	**W** 4-2	**Moore** (2-1)	Conley (4-2)	None	Ragin' Cajuns Digital Network	4,023	13–9	4–3
Mar. 25	Georgia State	No. 29	M. L. Tigue Moore Field • Lafayette, LA	**W** 7-3	**Leger** (3-1)	Habeck (1-1)	**Huval** (2)	Ragin' Cajuns Digital Network	4,289	14–9	5–3
Mar. 26	Georgia State	No. 29	M. L. Tigue Moore Field • Lafayette, LA	**W** 4-1	**Lee** (4-1)	White (1-1)	**Moore** (5)	MyAcadianaTV/ESPN3	4,099	15–9	6-3
Mar. 29	at Nicholls State	No. 27	Ben Meyer Diamond at Ray E. Didier Field • Thibodaux, LA	**W** 5-4	**Bazar** (1-0)	Petty (1-1)	**Moore** (6)	CST	1,184	16-9	

April (12-7)
Date	Opponent	Rank	Site/stadium	Score	Win	Loss	Save	TV	Attendance	Overall record	SBC record
Apr. 1	at Arkansas State		Tomlinson Stadium-Kell Field • Jonesboro, AR	**L** 6-7	Zuber (3-2)	**Leger** (3-2)	Ring (3)	None	407	16-10	6-4
Apr. 2	at Arkansas State		Tomlinson Stadium-Kell Field • Jonesboro, AR	**W** 5-2	**Marks** (3-2)	Kirby (0-1)	**Moore** (7)	None	535	17-10	7-4
Apr. 3	at Arkansas State		Tomlinson Stadium-Kell Field • Jonesboro, AR	**W** 6-1	**Lee** (5-1)	Jackson (0-1)	**Carter** (1)	None	400	18-10	8-4
Apr. 5	Northwestern State	No. 26	M. L. Tigue Moore Field • Lafayette, LA	**W** 4-0	**Guillory** (2-3)	Stovall (3-3)	None	MyAcadianaTV/ESPN3	4,146	19-10	
Apr. 8	at Georgia Southern	No. 26	J. I. Clements Stadium • Statesboro, GA	**W** 6-2 (10 inn)	**Moore** (3-1)	Hughes (0-1)	None	ESPN3	1,211	20-10	9-4
Apr. 9	at Georgia Southern	No. 26	J. I. Clements Stadium • Statesboro, GA	**L** 2-3	Cohen (3-2)	**Marks** (3-3)	Simmons (1)	None	1,017	20-11	9-5
Apr. 10	at Georgia Southern	No. 26	J. I. Clements Stadium • Statesboro, GA	**W** 13-9	**Moore** (4-1)	Yelverton (0-2)	None	None	771	21-11	10-5
Apr. 12	No. 23 Tulane	No. 22	M. L. Tigue Moore Field • Lafayette, LA	**W** 9-2	**Guillory** (3-3)	France (2-1)	None	Ragin' Cajuns Digital Network	4,159	22-11	
Apr. 13	at New Orleans	No. 22	Maestri Field at Privateer Park • New Orleans, LA	Game Postponed to May 17 due to heavy rains and flooding in New Orleans.							
Apr. 15	Southeastern Louisiana	No. 22	M. L. Tigue Moore Field • Lafayette, LA	**W** 4-1	**Leger** (4-2)	Cedotal (4-4)	**Moore** (8)	Ragin' Cajuns Digital Network	4,460	23-11	
Apr. 16	at Southeastern Louisiana	No. 22	Pat Kenelly Diamond at Alumni Field • Hammond, LA	**L** 5-16	Sceroler (6-2)	**Marks** (3-4)	None	CST/ESPN3	1,776	23-12	
Apr. 17	at Southeastern Louisiana	No. 22	Pat Kenelly Diamond at Alumni Field • Hammond, LA	**W** 5-4	**Lee** (6-1)	Cashman (3-2)	**Moore** (9)	CST/ESPN3	1,336	24-12	
Apr. 19	Nicholls State	No. 20	M. L. Tigue Moore Field • Lafayette, LA	**W** 4-3	**Guillory** (4-3)	Smith (1-3)	**Carter** (2)	Ragin' Cajuns Digital Network	4,035	25-12	
Apr. 20	McNeese State	No. 20	M. L. Tigue Moore Field • Lafayette, LA	Game cancelled due to inclement weather in Lafayette. Game will not be made up.							
Apr. 22	Texas State	No. 20	M. L. Tigue Moore Field • Lafayette, LA	**W** 5-1	**Leger** (5-2)	Humpal (5-3)	None	Ragin' Cajuns Digital Network	4,163	26–12	11-5
Apr. 23	Texas State	No. 20	M. L. Tigue Moore Field • Lafayette, LA	**L** 1-2	Geisler (4-1)	**Marks** (3-5)	None	Ragin' Cajuns Digital Network	4,340	26–13	11-6
Apr. 24	Texas State	No. 20	M. L. Tigue Moore Field • Lafayette, LA	**W** 1-0	**Carter** (2-0)	Pagano (0-1)	**Moore** (10)	Ragin' Cajuns Digital Network	4,258	27-13	12-6
Apr. 26	at No. 13 Southern Miss	No. 14	Pete Taylor Park • Hattiesburg, MS	**L** 2-7	Winston (5-0)	**Guillory** (4-4)	None	None	3,645	27–14	
Apr. 27	Louisiana Tech	No. 14	M. L. Tigue Moore Field • Lafayette, LA	**L** 3-6	Baugham (1-0)	**Carter** (2-1)	Ahlrich (1)	MyAcadianaTV/ESPN3	4,114	27-15	
Apr. 30	at UT Arlington	No. 18	Clay Gould Ballpark • Arlington, TX	**L** 1-4	Simmons (8-3)	**Leger** (5-3)	Moreland (3)	None	576	27–16	12-7
Apr. 30	at UT Arlington	No. 18	Clay Gould Ballpark • Arlington, TX	**W** 6-4	**Carter** (3-1)	Kuhnel (4-3)	**Moore** (11)	None	520	28-16	13-7

May (9-3)
Date	Opponent	Rank	Site/stadium	Score	Win	Loss	Save	TV	Attendance	Overall record	SBC record
May 1	at UT Arlington	No. 18	Clay Gould Ballpark • Arlington, TX	**W** 19-6	**Harris** (1-0)	Wilcox (3-4)	None	None	636	29-16	14-7
May 6	Appalachian State	No. 19	M. L. Tigue Moore Field • Lafayette, LA	**W** 7-0	**Leger** (6-3)	Hampton (1-7)	None	Ragin' Cajuns Digital Network	4,221	30-16	15-7
May 7	Appalachian State	No. 19	M. L. Tigue Moore Field • Lafayette, LA	**L** 1-6	Gorham (3-4)	**Marks** (3-6)	None	Ragin' Cajuns Digital Network	4,457	30-17	15-8
May 8	Appalachian State	No. 19	M. L. Tigue Moore Field • Lafayette, LA	**W** 4-1	**Moore** (5-1)	Howell (5-2)	None	MyAcadianaTV/ESPN3	4,096	31-17	16-8
May 11	at Houston	No. 21	Schroeder Park • Houston, TX	**L** 2-3	King (6-3)	**Guillory** (4-5)	Hernandez (8)	None	622	31-18	
May 13	at No. 23 South Alabama	No. 21	Eddie Stanky Field • Mobile, AL	**L** 2-3	Dolloff (3-4)	**Carter** (3-2)	None	None	2,219	31-19	16-9
May 14	at No. 23 South Alabama	No. 21	Eddie Stankey Field • Mobile, AL	**W** 5-4 (11 inn)	**Moore** (6-1)	Soleymani (4-3)	None	None	2,027	32-19	17-9
May 15	at No. 23 South Alabama	No. 21	Eddie Stankey Field • Mobile, AL	**W** 6-3	**Harris** (2-0)	Bembnowski (6-2)	**Carter** (3)	None	1,656	33-19	18-9
May 17	at New Orleans	No. 19	Maestri Field at Privateer Field • New Orleans, LA	**W** 17-3 (7 inn)	**Marks** (4-6)	Leone (1-3)	None	None	478	34-19	
May 20	Louisiana-Monroe	No. 19	M. L. Tigue Moore Field • Lafayette, LA	**W** 8-2	**Carter** (4-2)	Bradford (2-3)	None	Ragin' Cajuns Digital Network	4,125	35-19	19-9
May 20	Louisiana–Monroe	No. 19	M. L. Tigue Moore Field • Lafayette, LA	**W** 6-5 (11 inn)	**Huval** (2-1)	Herrera (1-4)	None	MyAcadianaTV/ESPN3	4,264	36-19	20-9
May 21	Louisiana–Monroe	No. 19	M. L. Tigue Moore Field • Lafayette, LA	**W** 6-2	**Guillory** (5-5)	Auger (1-3)	None	Ragin' Cajuns Digital Network	4,442	37-19	21-9

Post-season (6-2)

SBC Tournament
Date	Opponent	Rank	Site/stadium	Score	Win	Loss	Save	TV	Attendance	Overall record	SBC record
May 25	vs. Arkansas State	No. 17	Bobcat Ballpark • San Marcos, TX	**W** 7-4	**Carter** (5-2)	Lee (5-7)	None	None	1,254	38-19	
May 27	vs. Texas State	No. 17	Bobcat Ballpark • San Marcos, TX	**W** 4-2	**Lee** (7-1)	Geisler (4-3)	**Moore** (12)	None	1,056	39-19	
May 28	vs. Arkansas State	No. 17	Bobcat Ballpark • San Marcos, TX	**W** 17-10	**Huval** (3-1)	Lee (5-8)	**Carter** (4)	None	921	40-19	
May 20	vs. Georgia Southern	No. 17	Bobcat Ballpark • San Marcos, TX	**W** 5-0	**Marks** (5-6)	Challenger (7-5)	**Moore** (13)	ESPN3	961	41-19	

NCAA Division I Baseball Championship (2-2)
Date	Opponent	Seed/Rank	Site/stadium	Score	Win	Loss	Save	TV	Attendance	Overall record	SBC record
Lafayette Regionals
Jun. 3	vs. Princeton	No. 14	M. L. Tigue Moore Field • Lafayette, LA	**W** 5-3	**Carter** (6-2)	Powers (6-4)	**Moore** (14)	ESPN3	3,569	42-19	
Jun. 5	vs. No. 26 Arizona	No. 14	M. L. Tigue Moore Field • Lafayette, LA	**W** 10-3	**Leger** (7-3)	Cloney (6-4)	**Huval** (3)	ESPN3	3,638	43-19	
Jun. 6	vs. No. 26 Arizona	No. 14	M. L. Tigue Moore Field • Lafayette, LA	**L** 3-6	Bannister (11-2)	**Guillory** (5-6)	Ginkel (3)	ESPN3	3,673	43-20	
Jun. 6	vs. No. 26 Arizona	No. 14	M. L. Tigue Moore Field • Lafayette, LA	**L** 1-3	Ginkel (4-1)	**Marks** (5-7)	Ming (1)	ESPN3	3,674	43-21	

Schedule source:

- Rankings are based on the team's current ranking in the Collegiate Baseball poll.

== Lafayette Regional ==
Lafayette Regional Teams
(1) Louisiana–Lafayette Ragin' Cajuns	(2) Arizona Wildcats	(3) Sam Houston State Bearkats	(4) Princeton Tigers

First Round
1	Louisiana–Lafayette	5
4	Princeton	3
3	Sam Houston State	2
2	Arizona	7
Lower round 1
4	Princeton	2
3	Sam Houston State	7

Semi-Finals
1	Louisiana–Lafayette	10
2	Arizona	3
Lower final
3	Sam Houston State	5
2	Arizona	6

Finals
1	Louisiana–Lafayette
2	Arizona
