= 2016 NCAA Division I baseball rankings =

2016 NCAA Division I baseball season
- Duration: February 13, 2016 – June 30, 2016
- Number of teams: 301
- Preseason No. 1: Florida (Unanimous)

Tournament
- Duration: June 3 – 30, 2016
- Most conference bids: ACC (10)

College World Series
- Champions: Coastal Carolina (1st title)
- Runners-up: Arizona
- MOP: Andrew Beckwith, Coastal Carolina

Seasons
- ← 2015 2017 →

The following human polls make up the 2016 NCAA Division I men's baseball rankings. The USA Today/ESPN Coaches Poll is voted on by a panel of 31 Division I baseball coaches. The Baseball America poll is voted on by staff members of the Baseball America magazine. These polls, along with the Perfect Game USA poll, rank the top 25 teams nationally. Collegiate Baseball and the National Collegiate Baseball Writers Association rank the top 30 teams nationally.

== Legend ==
	Increase in ranking
	Decrease in ranking
	Not ranked previous week
Italics	Number of first place votes
(#-#)	Win–loss record
т	Tied with team above or below also with this symbol

== ESPN/USA Today Coaches Poll ==
	Preseason Jan 28	Week 3 Mar 7	Week 4 Mar 14	Week 5 Mar 21	Week 6 Mar 28	Week 7 Apr 4	Week 8 Apr 11	Week 9 Apr 18	Week 10 Apr 25	Week 11 May 2	Week 12 May 9	Week 13 May 16	Week 14 May 23	Week 15 May 30	Week 18 July 1	
1.	Florida 21	Florida 30 (12–1)	Florida 30 (17–1)	Florida 30 (21–1)	Texas A&M 18 (21–3)	Florida 28 (27–3)	Miami (FL) 26 (25–4)	Miami (FL) 16 (29–5)	Florida 29 (36–6)	Florida 26 (37-7)	Florida 26 (40–8)	Florida 28 (43-9)	Florida 8 (44-11)	Texas A&M 26 (45–14)	Coastal Carolina 23 (55–18)	1.
2.	Louisville 2	Vanderbilt (10–1)	Vanderbilt 1 (15–1)	Texas A&M (18–2)	Miami (FL) 4 (20–4)	Miami (FL) 2 (23–4)	Florida 5 (29–5)	Florida 15 (33–5)	Texas A&M 2 (32–8)	Texas A&M 4 (35-9)	Texas A&M 3 (37–10)	Texas A&M 2 (39-11)	Texas A&M 7 (41-13)	Florida 3 (47–13)	Arizona (49–24)	2.
3.	Vanderbilt 3	Texas A&M (11–1)	Texas A&M (15–1)	Oregon State (15–2)	Florida 8 (23–3)	Vanderbilt 1 (23–5)	Texas A&M (25–7)	Texas A&M (29–7)	Miami (FL) (30–8)	Miami (FL) (33-8)	Miami (FL) (35–9)	Miami (FL) (40-9)	Mississippi State 6 (40-14-1)	Miami (FL) 1 (45–11)	TCU (49–18)	3.
4.	Texas A&M 1	Oregon State (10–1)	Louisville (13–2)	Vanderbilt (17–3)	Vanderbilt 1 (20–4)	Louisville (22–5)	Vanderbilt (25–7)	Louisville (29–7)	Mississippi State (27–13–1)	Mississippi State (30-14-1)	Mississippi State (33–14–1)	Mississippi State (37-14-1)	Miami (FL) 5 (43-10)	Mississippi State (41–16–1)	Oklahoma State (43–22)	4.
5.	LSU 1	Louisville (9–2)	Oregon State (12–2)	Miami (FL) (16–4)	Louisville (19–5)	Texas A&M (22–6)	South Carolina (28–5)	Vanderbilt (28–8)	South Carolina (33–8)	Vanderbilt (34-10)	Louisville (38–10)	Louisville (42-10)	Louisville 4 (46-10)	Louisville (47–12)	Florida (52–16)	5.
6.	Miami (FL)	Miami (FL) (9–2)	Miami (FL) (13–3)	TCU (16–3)	South Carolina (23–2)	TCU (22–5)	Florida State (22–8)	TCU (27–8)	Florida State (28–11)	Louisville (35-9)	Florida State (32–13)	Ole Miss (39-13)	Vanderbilt (41-15)	LSU (42–18)	Texas Tech (47–20)	6.
7.	Virginia 3	North Carolina (9–1)	TCU (12–3)	North Carolina (17–2)	Oregon State (16–5)	South Carolina (24–5)	Louisville (24–7)	LSU (25–11)	Vanderbilt (30–10)	South Carolina (34-9)	Vanderbilt (36–12)	Texas Tech (38-13)	LSU (39-17)	Ole Miss (43–17)	UC Santa Barbara (43–21)	7.
8.	Oregon State	LSU (9–2)	LSU (12–3)	Louisville (16–4)	Florida State (18–5)	Florida State (19–6)	Mississippi State (23–9–1)	South Carolina (29–8)	Louisville (31–9)	Florida State (29-12)	South Carolina (36–11)	LSU (36-16)	Texas Tech (40-14)	Vanderbilt (43–17)	Miami (FL) (50–15)	8.
9.	UCLA	TCU (9–2)	North Carolina (12–2)	Ole Miss (19–2)	TCU (18–5)	Oregon State (19–7)	TCU (24–7)	NC State (26–10)	NC State (28–11)	NC State (31-12)	Texas Tech (37–13)	Vanderbilt (37-15)	South Carolina (42-13)	TCU (42–15)	Texas A&M (49–16)	9.
10.	Oklahoma State	Oregon (8–2)	Ole Miss (15–1)	South Carolina (20–2)	North Carolina (19–4)	Mississippi State (20–8–1)	Oregon State (22–7)	Florida State (23–11)	TCU (28–10)	Ole Miss (33-12) т	TCU (33–12)	South Carolina (38-13)	Ole Miss (40-16)	Clemson (42–18)	Louisville (50–14)	10.
11.	TCU	NC State (10–2)	Florida State (13–3)	Florida State (15–5)	Ole Miss (20–5)	California (18–6)	Ole Miss (25–70	Mississippi State (24–12–1)	Oregon State (26–10)	Texas Tech (34-13) т	Ole Miss (36–13)	TCU (34-14)	TCU (38-14) т	Texas Tech (41–16)	Mississippi State (44–18–1)	11.
12.	California	California (9–3)	South Carolina (15–2)	Virginia (15–6)	Mississippi State (17–7–1)	North Carolina (20–7)	LSU (21–10)	Oregon State (23–9)	Ole Miss (31–10)	TCU (30-12)	NC State (32–14)	Florida State (33-17)	Virginia (36-18) т	Florida State (37–20)	LSU (45–21)	12.
13.	Louisiana–Lafayette	Ole Miss (10–1)	Arkansas (13–3)	LSU (14–5)	California (14–6)	Florida Atlantic (21–4)	North Carolina (23–9)	Texas Tech (29–9)	LSU (27–13)	Oregon State (28-12)	LSU (31–16)	Virginia (33-18)	Florida State (34-19)	South Carolina (42–15)	Florida State (41–22)	13.
14.	Florida State	Arkansas (10–2)	California (10–4)	Missouri State (17–2)	LSU (16–7)	LSU (18–9)	NC State (22–9)	UC Santa Barbara (24–7–1)	Texas Tech (31–12)	UC Santa Barbara (29-10-1)	Virginia (31–17)	North Carolina State (32-17)	NC State (34-18)	Virginia (37–20)	South Carolina (46–18)	14.
15.	Oregon	Florida State (8–3)	Mississippi State (12–3–1)	NC State (16–6)	Arkansas (18–6)	Ole Miss (21–7)	California (19–9)	North Carolina (25–11)	Coastal Carolina (30–11)	LSU (28-16)	Oklahoma State (30–15)	Oklahoma State (32-17)	Clemson (38-18)	Louisiana–Lafayette (41–19)	Clemson (44–20)	15.
16.	Cal State Fullerton	South Carolina (10–2)	NC State (13–4)	Mississippi State (14–6–1)	Virginia (17–8)	Clemson (21–7)	Missouri State (25–60	Ole Miss (26–10)	Louisiana–Lafayette (27–13)	Virginia (30-17)	Florida Atlantic (33–13)	Tulane (35-15)	Oklahoma State (35-18)	Coastal Carolina (44–15)	East Carolina (38–23–1)	16.
17.	Mississippi State	Georgia Tech (11–0)	Virginia (11–5)	Clemson (16–3)	Florida Atlantic (18–4)	Missouri State (22–5)	Florida Atlantic (23–6)	Florida Atlantic (25–8)	Florida Atlantic (28–10)	Florida Atlantic (30-12)	Oregon State (29–15)	Florida Atlantic (34-15)	Louisiana–Lafayette (37-19) т	NC State (35–20)	Vanderbilt (43–19)	17.
18.	Houston	Virginia (7–4)	Oregon (8–5)	Arkansas (15–6)	Georgia Tech (18–5)	NC State (19–9)	Clemson (23–9)	California (21–11)	Virginia (26–17)	North Carolina (28-15)	UC Santa Barbara (31–12–1)	Clemson (34-18)	Florida Atlantic (37-15) т	Southern Miss (40–18)	Ole Miss (43–19)	18.
19.	NC State	UCLA (6–5)	Missouri State (12–2)	FAU (15–3)	UC Santa Barbara (18–4)	BYU (23–3)	UC Santa Barbara (21–7–1)	Missouri State (27–8)	UC Santa Barbara (25–10–1)	Oklahoma State (28-15)	Michigan (34–12)	Southern Miss (36-15)	Coastal Carolina (40-15)	Florida Atlantic (38–17)	Louisiana–Lafayette (43–21)	19.
20.	North Carolina	East Carolina (8–3)	Florida Atlantic (13–2)	California (11–6)	Oklahoma State (17–7)	UC Santa Barbara (20–6)	Georgia Tech (23–8)	Rice (24–11)	North Carolina (26–15)	Georgia Tech (30-14)	Arizona (31–16)	North Carolina (32-19)	Tulane (37-17)	Oklahoma State (36–20)	NC State (38–22)	20.
21.	Southern California	Missouri State (9–1)	Clemson (11–3)	Georgia Tech (15–4)	Missouri State (19–4)	Arkansas (19–9)	Texas Tech (24–9)	BYU (27–7)	Michigan (28–10)	Louisiana-Lafayette (29-16)	Rice (31–14)	Coastal Carolina т (36-15)	UC Santa Barbara (35-16-1)	Tulane (39–19)	Boston College (35–22)	21.
22.	Arkansas	Florida Atlantic (9–1)	Georgia Tech (12–3)	UC Santa Barbara (15–3)	Clemson (17–6)	Virginia (18–11)	BYU (25–5)	Virginia (23–18)	Oklahoma State (25–14)	Michigan (29-12)	North Carolina (30–17)	Rice т (32-16)	North Carolina (34-21)	Bryant (47–10)	Virginia (38–22)	22.
23.	South Carolina	Mississippi State (8–3–1)	Michigan State (13–1)	UCLA (11–7)	NC State (16–8)	Michigan (20–5)	Kentucky (22–9)	Clemson (24–12)	Missouri State (28–10)	Creighton (30-9)	Coastal Carolina (34–14)	Louisiana–Lafayette (33-19)	Bryant (44-10)	UC Santa Barbara (37–18–1)	Southern Miss (41–20)	23.
24.	Rice	Louisiana–Lafayette (8–4)	Michigan (11–3)	BYU (18–2)	BYU (20–3)	Georgia Tech (20–7)	South Alabama (25–8)	Louisiana–Lafayette (24–12)	East Carolina (26–14)	Coastal Carolina (31-14)	Clemson (31–16)	Minnesota (33-15)	Southern Miss (36-18)	Cal State Fullerton (35–21)	Tulane (41–21)	24.
25.	Missouri State	Alabama (10–2)	Arizona State (13–3)	Oklahoma State (13–7)	Houston (16–7)	Oklahoma State (19–9)	Virginia (20–14)	Michigan (25–9)	Georgia Tech (27–13)	Minnesota (27-13)	Georgia Tech (31–15)	Georgia Tech (33-18)	Cal State Fullerton (33-19)	Ohio State (43–18–1)	Dallas Baptist (44–19)	25.
	Preseason Jan 28	Week 3 Mar 7	Week 4 Mar 14	Week 5 Mar 21	Week 6 Mar 28	Week 7 Apr 4	Week 8 Apr 11	Week 9 Apr 18	Week 10 Apr 25	Week 11 May 2	Week 12 May 9	Week 13 May 16	Week 14 May 23	Week 15 May 30	Week 18 July 1	
		Dropped: 10. Oklahoma State; 16. Cal State Fullerton; 18. Houston; 20. Southern California; 24. Rice	Dropped: 19. UCLA; 20. East Carolina; 24. Louisiana–Lafayette; 25. Alabama	Dropped: 18. Oregon; 23. Michigan State; 24. Michigan; 25. Arizona State	Dropped: 23. UCLA	Dropped: 25. Houston	Dropped: 21. Arkansas; 22. Michigan; 25. Oklahoma State	Dropped: 20. Georgia Tech; 23. Kentucky; 24. South Alabama	Dropped: 18. California; 20. Rice; 21. BYU; 23. Clemson	Dropped: 23. Missouri State; 24. East Carolina	Dropped: 21. Louisiana–Lafayette; 23. Creighton; 25. Minnesota	Dropped: 17. Oregon State; 18. UC Santa Barbara; 19. Michigan; 20. Arizona	Dropped: 21. Rice; 24. Minnesota; 25. Georgia Tech	Dropped: 22. North Carolina	Dropped: 19. Florida Atlantic; 22. Bryant; 24. Cal State Fullerton; 25. Ohio State	

== Baseball America ==
	Preseason Jan 25	Week 1 Feb 22	Week 2 Feb 29	Week 3 Mar 7	Week 4 Mar 14	Week 5 Mar 21	Week 6 Mar 28	Week 7 Apr 4	Week 8 Apr 11	Week 9 Apr 18	Week 10 Apr 25	Week 11 May 2	Week 12 May 9	Week 13 May 16	Week 14 May 23	Week 15 May 30	Week 18 July 1	
1.	Florida	Florida (3–0)	Florida (7–1)	Florida (12–1)	Florida (17–1)	Florida (21–1)	Texas A&M (21–3)	Florida (27–3)	Miami (FL) (25–4)	Miami (FL) (29–5)	Florida (36–6)	Florida (37–7)	Florida (40–8)	Florida (43–9)	Texas A&M (41–13)	Texas A&M (45–14)	Coastal Carolina (55-18)	1.
2.	Louisville	Louisville (3–0)	Texas A&M (7–1)	Texas A&M (11–1)	Texas A&M (15–1)	Texas A&M (18–2)	Florida (23–3)	Miami (FL) (23–4)	Mississippi State (23–9)	Florida (33–5)	Texas A&M (32–8)	Texas A&M (35–9)	Texas A&M (37–10)	Texas A&M (39–11)	Mississippi State (40–14)	Florida (47–13)	Arizona (49-24)	2.
3.	Texas A&M	Texas A&M (3–0)	Oregon State (7–1)	Oregon State (10–1)	Oregon State (12–2)	Oregon State (15–2)	Miami (FL) (20–4)	Texas A&M (22–6)	Florida (29–5)	Texas A&M (29–7)	Mississippi State (27–13)	Mississippi State (30–14)	Mississippi State (33–14)	Mississippi State (37–14)	Miami (FL) (43–10)	Miami (FL) (45–11)	TCU (49-18)	3.
4.	Virginia	Virginia (2–1)	Louisville (5–2)	Louisville (7–0)	Louisville (13–2)	Miami (FL) (16–4)	Louisville (19–5)	Louisville (23–5)	Texas A&M (25–7)	TCU (27–8)	Miami (FL) (30–8)	Miami (Fl) (33–8)	Miami (FL) (35–9)	Miami (Fl) (40–9)	Florida (44–11)	Mississippi State (41–16)	Oklahoma State (43-22)	4.
5.	Oregon State	Oregon State (2–1)	Vanderbilt (8–0)	Vanderbilt (10–1)	Vanderbilt (15–1)	TCU (16–3)	Mississippi State (17–7–1)	Mississippi State (20–8)	South Carolina (28–5)	LSU (25–11)	Florida State (28–11)	Florida State (29–12)	Texas Tech (37–13)	Texas Tech (38–13)	Texas Tech (40–14)	LSU (42–18)	Florida (52-16)	5.
6.	Miami (FL)	Miami (FL) (3–0)	Miami (FL) (5–2)	Miami (FL) (9–2)	Miami (FL) (13–3)	North Carolina (17–2)	Vanderbilt (20–4)	Vanderbilt (23–5)	Florida State (22–8)	Louisville (29–7)	South Carolina (33–8)	South Carolina (34–9)	Ole Miss (36–13)	Ole Miss (39–13)	Louisville (46–10)	Ole Miss (43–17)	Miami (FL) (48-14)	6.
7.	Vanderbilt	Vanderbilt (3–0)	LSU (5–2)	LSU (9–2)	LSU (12–3)	Ole Miss (19–2)	South Carolina (23–2)	TCU (22–5)	TCU (24–7)	Mississippi State (24–12)	TCU (28–10)	Ole Miss (33–12)	Florida State (32–13)	Louisville (42–10)	LSU (39–17)	Louisville (47–12)	Texas Tech (47-20)	7.
8.	California	LSU (3–0)	Virginia (4–3)	TCU (9–2)	TCU (12–3)	Louisville (16–4)	TCU (18–5)	South Carolina (24–5)	Ole Miss (25–7)	Vanderbilt (28–8)	LSU (27–13)	Texas Tech (34–13)	South Carolina (36–11)	LSU (36–16)	Virginia (36–18)	Texas Tech (41-16)	Texas A&M (49-16)	8.
9.	Oklahoma State	Houston (3–0)	TCU (6–1)	California (9–3)	California (10–4)	Virginia (15–6)	North Carolina (19–4)	California (18–6)	LSU (21–10)	UC Santa Barbara (24–7)	Ole Miss (31–10)	Louisville (35–9)	Louisville (38–10)	Virginia (33–18)	South Carolina (42–13)	Clemson (42–18)	UC Santa Barbara (43-20)	9.
10.	UCLA	Louisiana–Lafayette (3–0)	California (5–2)	Virginia (7–4)	Virginia (11–5)	Mississippi State (14–6)	California (14–6)	Oregon State (19–7)	Oregon State (22–7)	Texas Tech (29–9)	Louisville (31–9)	Vanderbilt (34–10)	TCU (33–12)	South Carolina (38–13)	Ole Miss (40–16)	TCU (42–15)	Mississippi State (44-18)	10.
11.	LSU	California (1–2)	Oregon (6–1)	Oregon (8–2)	North Carolina (12–2)	Vanderbilt (17–3)	Oregon State (16–5)	Florida State (19–6)	Louisville (24–7)	Florida State (23–11)	Vanderbilt (30–10)	NC State (31–12)	LSU (31–16)	Tulane (35–15)	Tulane (37–17)	Virginia (37–20)	Louisville (50-14)	11.
12.	Houston	Oregon (3–0)	North Carolina (5–1)	North Carolina (9–1)	Ole Miss (15–1)	Florida State (15–5)	Florida State (18–5)	UC Santa Barbara (20–6)	Vanderbilt (25–7)	South Carolina (29–8)	NC State (28–11)	TCU (30–12)	Vanderbilt (36–12)	Vanderbilt (37–15)	Vanderbilt (41–15)	Vanderbilt (43–17)	LSU (45-21)	12.
13.	Louisiana–Lafayette	Oklahoma State (2–2)	Ole Miss (6–1)	Ole Miss (10–1)	Florida State (13–3)	LSU (14–5)	Ole Miss (20–5)	North Carolina (21–7)	UC Santa Barbara (21–7)	Rice (24–11)	Texas Tech (31–12)	LSU (28–16)	NC State (32–14)	Southern Miss (36–15)	Florida Atlantic (37–15)	Florida State (37–20)	Florida State (41-22)	13.
14.	Oregon	Michigan (4–0)	UCLA (3–4)	UCLA (6–5)	UCLA (8–7)	UCLA (11–7)	Virginia (17–8)	Ole Miss (21–7)	North Carolina (23–9)	NC State (26–10)	Southern Miss (29–12)	Rice (27–14)	Rice (31–14)	Florida State (33–17)	TCU (34–18)	South Carolina (42–15)	South Carolina (46-18)	14.
15.	Michigan	UCLA (1–2)	Florida State (5–1)	Florida State (8–3)	Mississippi State (12–3)	California (11–6)	Houston (16–7)	LSU (18–9)	Texas Tech (24–9)	Ole Miss (26–10)	Rice (25–12)	UC Santa Barbara (29–10)	Virginia (31–17)	TCU (34–14)	Clemson (38–18)	Coastal Carolina (44–15)	East Carolina (38-23)	15.
16.	Southern California	Florida State (3–0)	Louisiana–Lafayette (4–3)	Louisiana–Lafayette (8–4)	Louisiana–Lafayette (10–6)	Houston (13–6)	Oklahoma State (17–7)	Oklahoma State (19–9)	Kentucky (22–9)	North Carolina (25–11)	Michigan (28–10)	Virginia (30–17)	Oklahoma State (30–15)	Rice (32–16)	NC State (34–18)	Tulane (39–19)	Boston College (34-22)	16.
17.	Florida State	TCU (2–1)	Arkansas (8–0)	NC State (10–2)	Arkansas (13–3)	Clemson (16–3)	Long Beach State (16–7)	Michigan (20–5)	California (19–9)	Long Beach State (21–13)	UC Santa Barbara (25–10)	Oregon State (28–12)	Florida Atlantic (33–13)	Florida Atlantic (32–14)	Oklahoma State (35–18)	Florida Atlantic (38–17)	Clemson (44-20)	17.
18.	TCU	NC State (2–1)	NC State (5–2)	Arkansas (10–2)	Michigan (11–3)	South Carolina (20–2)	UC Santa Barbara (18–4)	Florida Atlantic (21–4)	Long Beach State (19–11)	Michigan (25–9)	Oregon State (26–10)	Oklahoma State (28–15)	Tulane (31–14)	Cal State Fullerton (32–17)	Florida State (34–19)	Southern Miss (40–18)	Ole Miss (43-19)	18.
19.	NC State	Coastal Carolina (2–1)	Coastal Carolina (4–2)	Michigan (7–3)	Oregon (8–5)	Oklahoma State (13–7)	LSU (16–7)	Kentucky (20–8)	Rice (20–11)	Kentucky (23–12)	Coastal Carolina (30–11)	Florida Atlantic (30–12)	Southern Miss (34–14)	NC State (32–17)	Coastal Carolina (40–15)	Louisiana–Lafayette (41–19)	Tulane (41-21)	19.
20.	Mississippi State	North Carolina (2–1)	Michigan (5–2)	Georgia Tech (11–0)	Houston (8–6)	Long Beach State (14–6)	Michigan (16–5)	Long Beach State (17–10)	NC State (22–9)	California (21–11)	Tulane (26–13)	Tulane (28–14)	Washington (27–16)	Oklahoma State (32–17)	Southern Miss (36–18)	Bryant (47–10)	Vanderbilt (43-19)	20.
21.	Oklahoma	Ole Miss (3–0)	Houston (4–3)	Houston (6–5)	NC State (13–4)	NC State (16–6)	Alabama (15–8)	Clemson (21–7)	Florida Atlantic (23–6)	Florida Atlantic (25–8)	East Carolina (26–14)	Southern Miss (31–14)	Arizona (31–16)	Minnesota (33–15)	Bryant (44–10)	Cal State Fullerton (35–21)	Virginia (38-22)	21.
22.	Cal State Fullerton	Kentucky (2–1)	Oklahoma State (2–5)	Oklahoma State (6–6)	Oklahoma State (9–6)	Alabama (13–6)	Arkansas (18–6)	East Carolina (19–9)	Michigan (21–8)	Oregon State (23–9)	Virginia (26–17)	Minnesota (27–13)	Cal State Fullerton (30–16)	Coastal Carolina (36–15)	Long Beach State (35–18)	NC State (35–20)	Louisiana-Lafayette (43-21)	22.
23.	Coastal Carolina	Georgia Tech (3–0)	Georgia Tech (7–0)	Alabama (10–2)	College of Charleston (11–4)	Michigan (12–5)	Georgia Tech (18–5)	Texas Tech (20–8)	South Alabama (25–8)	Michigan State (25–7)	Louisiana–Lafayette (27–13)	Washington (25–15)	Clemson (31–16)	Clemson (34–18)	Cal State Fullerton (33–19)	Ohio State (43–18)	Florida Atlantic (39-19)	23.
24.	Ole Miss	Mississippi State (2–2)	Mississippi State (6–2)	Mississippi State (8–3–1)	Long Beach State (10–5)	UC Santa Barbara (15–3)	Kentucky (17–6)	Houston (17–10)	Tulane (21–10)	Louisiana–Lafayette (24–12)	Minnesota (25–11)	Michigan State (30–11)	UC Santa Barbara (31–12)	Bryant (39–10)	Louisiana–Lafayette (37–19)	Oklahoma State (36–20)	Southern Miss (41-20)	24.
25.	Kentucky	Oklahoma (2–2)	East Carolina (6–1)	East Carolina (8–3)	Michigan State (13–1)	Arkansas (15–6)	Florida Atlantic (18–4)	Rice (17–10)	Southern Miss (25–8)	Coastal Carolina (27–10)	Oklahoma State (25–14)	Creighton (30–9)	Creighton (32–10)	Long Beach State (31–18)	Rice (32–20)	Dallas Baptist (41–17)	NC State (38-22)	25.
	Preseason Jan 25	Week 1 Feb 22	Week 2 Feb 29	Week 3 Mar 7	Week 4 Mar 14	Week 5 Mar 21	Week 6 Mar 28	Week 7 Apr 4	Week 8 Apr 11	Week 9 Apr 18	Week 10 Apr 25	Week 11 May 2	Week 12 May 9	Week 13 May 16	Week 14 May 23	Week 15 May 30	Week 18 July 1	
		Dropped: 16. Southern California; 22. Cal State Fullerton	Dropped: 22. Kentucky; 25. Oklahoma	Dropped: 19. Coastal Carolina	Dropped: 20. Georgia Tech; 23. Alabama; 25. East Carolina	Dropped: 16. Louisiana–Lafayette; 19. Oregon; 23. College of Charleston; 25. Michigan State	Dropped: 14. UCLA; 17. Clemson; 21. NC State	Dropped: 14. Virginia; 21. Alabama; 22. Arkansas; 23. Georgia Tech	Dropped: 16. Oklahoma State; 21. Clemson; 22. East Carolina; 24. Houston	Dropped: 23. South Alabama; 24. Tulane; 25. Southern Miss	Dropped: 16. North Carolina; 17. Long Beach State; 19. Kentucky; 20. California; 21. Florida Atlantic; 23. Michigan State	Dropped: 16. Michigan; 19. Coastal Carolina; 21. East Carolina; 23. Louisiana–Lafayette	Dropped: 17. Oregon State; 22. Minnesota; 24. Michigan State	Dropped: 20. Washington; 21. Arizona; 24. UC Santa Barbara; 25. Creighton	Dropped: 21. Minnesota	Dropped: 22. Long Beach State; 25. Rice	None	

== Collegiate Baseball ==
	Preseason Dec 21	Week 1 Feb 22	Week 2 Feb 29	Week 3 Mar 7	Week 4 Mar 14	Week 5 Mar 21	Week 6 Mar 28	Week 7 Apr 4	Week 8 Apr 11	Week 9 Apr 18	Week 10 Apr 25	Week 11 May 2	Week 12 May 9	Week 13 May 16	Week 14 May 23	Week 15 May 30	Week 16 June 8	Week 17 June 14	Week 18 July 1	
1.	Florida	Florida (3–0)	Florida (7–1)	Florida (12–1)	Florida (17–1)	Florida (21–1)	Florida (23–3)	Florida (27–3)	Miami (FL) (25–4)	Miami (FL) (29–5)	Florida (36–6)	Florida (37–7)	Florida (40–8)	Florida (43–9)	Mississippi State (40–14–1)	Texas A&M (45–14)	Texas A&M (48–14)	Florida (52–14)	Coastal Carolina (55–18)	1.
2.	Louisville	Louisville (3–0)	Vanderbilt (8–0)	Vanderbilt (10–1)	Vanderbilt (15–1)	Oregon State (15–2)	South Carolina (23–2)	Miami (FL) (23–4)	South Carolina (28–5)	Florida (33–5)	South Carolina (33–8)	South Carolina (34–9)	Miami (FL) (35–9)	Miami (FL) (40–9)	Miami (FL) (43–10)	Florida (47–13)	Florida (50–13)	Miami (FL) (50–12)	Arizona (49–24)	2.
3.	Vanderbilt	Vanderbilt (3–0)	Texas A&M (3–0)	Texas A&M (11–1)	Texas A&M (15–1)	North Carolina (17–2)	Texas A&M (21–3)	Vanderbilt (23–5)	Florida (29–5)	Louisville (29–7)	Florida State (28–11)	Miami (FL) (33–8)	South Carolina (36–11)	Texas A&M (39–11)	Louisville (46–10)	Miami (FL) (45–11)	Miami (FL) (48–11)	TCU (47–16)	TCU (49–18)	3.
4.	Miami (FL)	Miami (FL) (3–0)	Louisville (5–2)	Louisville (9–2)	Louisville (13–2)	Texas A&M (18–2)	Miami (FL) (20–4)	Louisville (22–5)	Florida State (22–8)	South Carolina (29–8)	Miami (FL) (30–8)	Florida State (29–12)	Florida State (32–13)	Louisville (42–10)	South Carolina (42–13)	Mississippi State (41–16–1)	Mississippi State (44–16–1)	Texas Tech (46–18)	Oklahoma State (43–22)	4.
5.	Texas A&M	Texas A&M (3–0)	Miami (FL) (5–2)	Miami (FL) (9–2)	Miami (FL) (13–3)	Miami (FL) (16–4)	Louisville (19–5)	Florida State (19–6)	Mississippi State (23–9–1)	Texas A&M (29–7)	Texas A&M (32–8)	Texas A&M (35–9)	Texas A&M (37–10)	Mississippi State (37–14–1)	Texas A&M (41–13)	Louisville (47–12)	Louisville (50–12)	Coastal Carolina (49–16)	Texas Tech (47–20)	5.
6.	Louisiana–Lafayette	Louisiana–Lafayette (3–0)	Oregon State (7–1)	Oregon State (10–1)	Oregon State (12–2)	Ole Miss (19–2)	Vanderbilt (20–4)	South Carolina (34–5)	Louisville (24–7)	Vanderbilt (28–8)	Vanderbilt (30–10)	Vanderbilt (34–10)	Louisville (38–10)	South Carolina (38–13)	Florida (44–11)	South Carolina (42–15)	South Carolina (46–16)	Oklahoma State (41–20)	UC Santa Barbara (43–20–1)	6.
7.	LSU	LSU (3–0)	Oregon (7–1)	North Carolina (9–1)	North Carolina (12–2)	Louisville (16–4)	Mississippi State (17–7–1)	Texas A&M (22–6)	Vanderbilt (25–7)	Texas Tech (29–9)	Louisville (31–9)	Louisville (35–9)	Mississippi State (33–14–1)	Texas Tech (38–13)	Texas Tech (40–14)	Texas Tech (41–16)	Texas Tech (44–17)	Arizona (44–21)	Florida (52–16)	7.
8.	Oregon State	Oregon State (2–1)	North Carolina (5–1)	Oregon (8–2)	Ole Miss (15–1)	Vanderbilt (17–3)	Florida State (18–5)	Mississippi State (20–8–1)	Texas A&M (25–7)	TCU (27–8)	Mississippi State (27–13–1)	Mississippi State (30–14–1)	Vanderbilt (36–12)	Florida State (33–17)	Virginia (36–18)	Virginia (37–20)	LSU (45–19)	UC Santa Barbara (42–18–1)	Miami (FL) (50–14)	8.
9.	Virginia	Virginia (2–1)	TCU (6–1)	Georgia Tech (8–0)	Florida State 13–3)	TCU (16–3)	North Carolina (19–4)	California (18–6)	Kentucky (22–9)	Florida State (23–11)	NC State (28–11)	NC State (31–12)	Texas Tech (37–13)	Virginia (33–18)	LSU (39–17)	LSU (42–18)	Florida State (40–20)	Texas A&M (49–16)	Texas A&M (49–16)	9.
10.	UCLA	Oregon (3–0)	LSU (5–2)	LSU (9–2)	LSU (12–3)	Missouri State (17–2)	California (14–6)	TCU (22–5)	Texas Tech (24–9)	Mississippi State (24–12–1)	Texas Tech (31–12)	Texas Tech (34–13)	NC State (32–14)	Vanderbilt (37–15)	Vanderbilt (41–15)	Vanderbilt (43–17)	TCU (45–15)	Mississippi State (44–18–1)	Mississippi State (44–18–1)	10.
11.	Mississippi State	Florida State (3–0)	Florida State (5–1)	TCU (9–2)	TCU (12–3)	Mississippi State (14–6–1)	UC Santa Barbara (18–4)	North Carolina (20–7)	TCU (24–7)	UC Santa Barbara (24–7–1)	TCU (28–10)	Virginia (30–17)	Virginia (31–17)	LSU (36–16)	Florida State (34–19)	Clemson (42–18)	Coastal Carolina (47–16)	Louisville (50–14)	Louisville (50–14)	11.
12.	Cal State Fullerton	Missouri State (3–0)	Missouri State (5–1)	Missouri State (9–1)	Missouri State (12–2)	Clemson (16–3)	Kentucky (17–6)	UC Santa Barbara (20–6)	California (19–9)	Kentucky (23–12)	Oregon State (26–10)	TCU (30–12)	Oklahoma State (30–15)	Ole Miss (39–13)	Oklahoma State (35–18)	Florida State (37–20)	Oklahoma State (39–20)	South Carolina (46–18)	South Carolina (46–18)	12.
13.	California	North Carolina (2–1)	Georgia Tech (7–0)	Ole Miss (10–1)	Mississippi State (12–3–1)	South Carolina (20–2)	Oregon State (16–5)	Kentucky (20–8)	UC Santa Barbara (21–7–1)	NC State (26–10)	Coastal Carolina (30–11)	UC Santa Barbara (29–10–1)	TCU (33–12)	Tulane (35–15)	NC State (34–18)	TCU (42–15)	Arizona (42–21)	LSU (45–21)	LSU (45–21)	13.
14.	Oregon	UCLA (1–2)	Virginia (4–3)	Florida State (8–3)	Virginia (11–5)	Florida State (15–5)	Ole Miss (20–5)	Oregon State (19–7)	Oregon State (22–7)	California (21–11)	Southern Miss (29–12)	Washington (25–15)	Washington (27–16)	Oklahoma State (32–17)	TCU (38–14)	Louisiana–Lafayette (41–19)	UC Santa Barbara (40–18–1)	Florida State (41–22)	Florida State (41–22)	14.
15.	TCU	TCU (2–1)	Florida Atlantic (7–0)	Virginia (7–4)	Florida Atlantic (13–2)	LSU (14–5)	TCU (18–5)	Ole Miss (21–7)	Ole Miss (25–7)	LSU (25–11)	LSU (27–13)	Oregon State (28–12)	Cal State Fullerton (30–16)	NC State (32–17)	Washington (31–19)	Coastal Carolina (44–15)	East Carolina (37–21–1)	East Carolina (38–23–1)	East Carolina (38–23–1)	15.
16.	Florida State	Houston (3–0)	Arkansas (8–0)	Florida Atlantic (9–1)	California (10–4)	Virginia (15–6)	Missouri State (19–4)	Missouri State (22–5)	Missouri State (25–6)	Missouri State (27–8)	Virginia (26–17)	Oklahoma State (28–15)	Southern Miss (34–14)	TCU (34–14)	Ole Miss (40–16)	Ole Miss (43–17)	Boston College (34–20)	Boston College (35–22)	Boston College (35–22)	16.
17.	Missouri State	Georgia Tech (3–0)	Ole Miss (6–1)	Arkansas (10–2)	Arkansas (13–3)	UC Santa Barbara (15–3)	Clemson (17–6)	Clemson (21–7)	NC State (22–9)	Oregon State (23–9)	Arizona (26–14)	Cal State Fullerton (27–15)	Arizona (31–16)	Washington (28–18)	Tulane (37–17)	NC State (35–20)	Virginia (38–22)	Virginia (38–22)	Virginia (38–22)	17.
18.	Houston	Florida Atlantic (4–0)	South Carolina (8–0)	California (9–3)	Oregon (8–5)	Florida Atlantic (15–3)	Florida Atlantic (18–4)	Florida Atlantic (21–4)	Southern Miss (25–8)	Coastal Carolina (27–10)	Minnesota (25–11)	Southern Miss (31–14)	Rice (31–14)	Southern Miss (36–15)	Louisiana–Lafayette (37–19)	Oklahoma State (36–20)	Clemson (44–20)	Clemson (44–20)	Clemson (44–20)	18.
19.	Tulane	Michigan (4–0)	UC Santa Barbara (7–1)	NC State (10–2)	Clemson (11–3)	NC State (16–6)	Georgia Tech (18–5)	Texas Tech (20–8)	North Carolina (23–9)	Southern Miss (27–10)	Cal Poly (25–13)	Arizona (28–16)	Tulane (31–14)	Cal State Fullerton (32–17)	Coastal Carolina (40–15)	Dallas Baptist (41–17)	Louisiana–Lafayette (43–21)	Louisiana–Lafayette (43–21)	Louisiana–Lafayette (43–21)	19.
20.	Rice	Tulane (2–1)	Long Beach State (7–1)	Clemson (8–2)	South Carolina (15–2)	California (11–6)	LSU (16–7)	Michigan (20–5)	LSU (21–10)	Virginia (23–15)	California (22–14)	Minnesota (27–13)	Ole Miss (36–13)	Arizona State (31–17)	Cal State Fullerton (33–19)	Utah (25–27)	NC State (38–22)	NC State (38–22)	NC State (38–22)	20.
21.	Georgia Tech	Stanford (2–1)	UCLA (3–4)	South Carolina (10–2)	UC Santa Barbara (12–3)	Georgia Tech (15–4)	Virginia (17–8)	NC State (19–9)	South Alabama (25–8)	North Carolina (25–11)	UC Santa Barbara (25–10–1)	Rice (27–14)	LSU (31–16)	Arizona (32–18)	Arizona State (33–19)	Washington (32–21)	Xavier (32–30)	Xavier (32–30)	Xavier (32–30)	21.
22.	North Carolina	Cal State Fullerton (1–2)	Alabama (6–1)	UC Santa Barbara (9–3)	Boston College (12–3)	Alabama (13–6)	NC State (16–8)	BYU (23–3)	Coastal Carolina (23–10)	Minnesota (21–11)	Kentucky (24–15)	South Alabama (33–12)	Georgia Tech (31–15)	Louisiana–Lafayette (33–19)	Long Beach State (35–18)	Tulane (39–19)	Washington (33–23)	Washington (33–23)	Washington (33–23)	22.
23.	Michigan	Arizona (2–1)	Mississippi State (6–2)	UCLA (6–5)	NC State (13–4)	BYU (18–2)	Michigan (16–5)	Coastal Carolina (20–9)	Clemson (23–9)	South Alabama (27–10)	South Alabama (30–11)	Georgia Tech (30–14)	South Alabama (36–14)	South Alabama (37–16)	Florida Atlantic (37–15)	Cal State Fullerton (35–21)	Vanderbilt (43–19)	Vanderbilt (43–19)	Vanderbilt (43–19)	23.
24.	Arkansas	Arkansas (3–0)	New Mexico (6–1)	Alabama (10–2)	Michigan (11–3)	Long Beach State (14–6)	BYU (20–3)	Georgia Tech (20–7)	Florida Atlantic (23–6)	Rice (24–11)	Ole Miss (31–10)	Long Beach State (26–16)	Coastal Carolina (34–14)	Rice (32–16)	Arizona (33–20)	Southern Miss (40–18)	Dallas Baptist (44–19)	Dallas Baptist (44–19)	Dallas Baptist (44–19)	24.
25.	Oklahoma State	Rice (1–2)	East Carolina (6–1)	Dallas Baptist (8–3)	Georgia Tech (12–3)	UCLA (11–7)	Alabama (15–8)	LSU (18–9)	Lamar (25–7)	Creighton (25–7)	Washington (22–14)	Coastal Carolina (31–14)	Indiana (28–17)	Coastal Carolina (36–15)	South Alabama (38–18)	Arizona State (34–21)	Tulane (41–21)	Tulane (41–21)	Tulane (41–21)	25.
26.	Stony Brook	California (1–2)	Michigan (5–2)	Mississippi State (8–3–1)	Dallas Baptist (11–4)	Michigan (12–5)	Long Beach State (16–7)	Virginia (18–11)	BYU (25–5)	Florida Atlantic (25–8)	Creighton (27–9)	Ole Miss (33–12)	UC Santa Barbara (31–12–1)	Minnesota (33–15)	Kent State (41–12)	Arizona (38–20)	South Alabama (42–22)	South Alabama (42–22)	South Alabama (42–22)	26.
27.	Notre Dame	Arizona State (4–0)	Tulane (4–3)	Michigan (7–3)	Arizona State (13–3)	Oregon (9–7)	Tulane (17–7)	Tulane (19–8)	Georgia Tech (23–8)	Washington (19–12)	Arizona State (23–14)	LSU (28–16)	Minnesota (30–15)	Indiana (30–18)	Dallas Baptist (37–17)	Florida Atlantic (38–17)	Southern Mississippi (41–20)	Southern Mississippi (41–20)	Southern Miss (41–20)	27.
28.	Maryland	Dallas Baptist (3–0)	Stanford (5–3)	East Carolina (8–3)	Tulane (11–5)	Kentucky (14–5)	Creighton (16–4)	South Alabama (21–7)	New Mexico (23–9)	Cal State Fullerton (21–13)	Cal State Fullerton (24–14)	Kentucky (27–17)	Arizona State (28–16)	Kent State (39–11)	Clemson (38–18)	Bryant (47–10)	Cal State Fullerton (36–23)	Cal State Fullerton (36–23)	Cal State Fullerton (36–23)	28.
29.	Kentucky	Ole Miss (3–0)	Cal State Fullerton (4–2)	Tulane (7–4)	Long Beach State (10–5)	Dallas Baptist (13–6)	Texas Tech (16–7)	Creighton (18–6)	Stanford (17–9)	Notre Dame (21–12)	Rice (25–13)	Creighton (30–9)	Michigan (34–12)	Dallas Baptist (34–16)	Bryant (44–10)	Long Beach State (36–20)	Arizona State (36–23)	Arizona State (36–23)	Arizona State (36–23)	29.
30.	Pepperdine	Alabama (2–1)	California (5–2)	Long Beach State (7–4)	UCLA (8–7)	Tulane (13–7)	Arizona (16–7)	Utah (10–14)	Creighton (20–7)	BYU (27–7)	Oklahoma State (25–14)	Arizona State (26–15)	Creighton (32–10)	Clemson (34–18)	Nebraska (37–18)	Ohio State (43–18–1)	Rice (38–24)	Rice (38–24)	Rice (38–24)	30.
	Preseason Dec 21	Week 1 Feb 22	Week 2 Feb 29	Week 3 Mar 7	Week 4 Mar 14	Week 5 Mar 21	Week 6 Mar 28	Week 7 Apr 4	Week 8 Apr 11	Week 9 Apr 18	Week 10 Apr 25	Week 11 May 2	Week 12 May 9	Week 13 May 16	Week 14 May 23	Week 15 May 30	Week 16 June 8	Week 17 June 14	Week 18 July 1	
		Dropped: 11. Mississippi State; 25. Oklahoma State; 26. Stony Brook; 27. Notre Dame; 28. Maryland; 29. Kentucky; 30. Pepperdine	Dropped: 6. Louisiana–Lafayette; 16. Houston; 23. Arizona; 25. Rice; 27. Arizona State; 28. Dallas Baptist	Dropped: 19. New Mexico; 28. Stanford; 29. Cal State Fullerton	Dropped: 24. Alabama; 28. East Carolina	Dropped: 17. Arkansas; 22. Boston College; 27. Arizona State	Dropped: 27. Oregon; 28. Kentucky; 29. Dallas Baptist	Dropped: 25. Alabama; 26. Long Beach State; 30. Arizona	Dropped: 20. Michigan; 26. Virginia; 27. Tulane; 30. Utah	Dropped: 15. Ole Miss; 23. Clemson; 25. Lamar; 27. Georgia Tech; 28. New Mexico; 29. Stanford	Dropped: 16. Missouri State; 21. North Carolina; 26. Florida Atlantic; 29. Notre Dame; 30. BYU	Dropped: 19. Cal Poly; 20. California	Dropped: 15. Oregon State; 24. Long Beach State; 28. Kentucky	Dropped: 22. Georgia Tech; 26. UC Santa Barbara; 29. Michigan; 30. Creighton	Dropped: 18. Southern Miss; 24. Rice; 26. Minnesota; 27. Indiana	Dropped: 25. South Alabama; 26. Kent State; 30. Nebraska	Dropped: 16. Ole Miss; 20. Utah; 27. Florida Atlantic; 28. Bryant; 29. Long Beach State; 30. Ohio State	None	None	

The Preseason poll ranked the top 40 teams in the nation. Teams not listed above are: 31. Dallas Baptist; 32. College of Charleston; 33. Coastal Carolina; 34. Missouri; 35. South Carolina; 36. San Diego State; 37. South Alabama; 38. Winthrop; 39 Texas Tech; 40. Texas.

== NCBWA ==
	Preseason Feb 1	Week 1 Feb 22	Week 2 Feb 29	Week 3 Mar 7	Week 4 Mar 14	Week 5 Mar 21	Week 6 Mar 28	Week 7 Apr 4	Week 8 Apr 11	Week 9 Apr 18	Week 10 Apr 25	Week 11 May 2	Week 12 May 9	Week 13 May 16	Week 14 May 23	Week 15 May 30	Week 16 June 8	Week 18 June 30	
1.	Florida	Florida (3–0)	Florida (7–1)	Florida (12–1)	Florida (17–1)	Florida (21–1)	Texas A&M (21–3)	Florida (27–3)	Miami (FL) (25–4)	Florida (33–5)	Florida (36–6)	Florida (37–7)	Florida (40–8)	Florida (43–9)	Mississippi State (40–14–1)	Texas A&M (45–14)	Texas A&M (48–14)	Coastal Carolina (53–17)	1.
2.	Louisville	Louisville (3–0)	Vanderbilt (8–0)	Vanderbilt (10–1)	Vanderbilt (15–1)	Texas A&M (18–2)	Miami (FL) (20–4)	Miami (FL) (23–4)	Florida (29–5)	Miami (FL) (29–5)	Texas A&M (32–8)	Texas A&M (35–9)	Texas A&M (37–10)	Texas A&M (39–11)	Texas A&M (41–13)	Miami (FL) (45–11)	Miami (FL) (48–11)	Arizona (48–22)	2.
3.	Vanderbilt	Vanderbilt (3–0)	Texas A&M (7–1)	Texas A&M (11–1)	Texas A&M (15–1)	Oregon State (15–2)	Florida (23–3)	Vanderbilt (23–5)	Texas A&M (25–7)	Texas A&M (29–7)	Mississippi State (27–13–1)	Mississippi State (30–14–1)	Mississippi State (33–14–1)	Mississippi State (37–14–1)	Miami (FL) (43–10)	Florida (47–13)	Florida (50–13)	TCU (49–18)	3.
4.	Texas A&M	Texas A&M (3–0)	Oregon State (7–1)	Oregon State (10–1)	Louisville (13–3)	Miami (FL) (16–4)	Vanderbilt (20–4)	Louisville (22–5)	Mississippi State (23–9–1)	Vanderbilt (28–8)	Miami (FL) (30–8)	Miami (FL) (33–8)	Miami (FL) (35–9)	Miami (FL) (40–9)	Louisville (46–10)	Mississippi State (41–16–1)	Mississippi State (44–16–1)	Oklahoma State (43–22)	4.
5.	Oregon State	Miami (FL) (3–0)	Louisville (5–2)	Louisville (9–2)	Oregon State (12–2)	TCU (16–3)	Louisville (19–5)	Texas A&M (22–6)	Florida State (22–8)	Louisville (29–7)	Florida State (28–11)	Louisville (35–9)	Louisville (38–10)	Louisville (42–10)	Florida (44–11)	LSU (42–18)	Louisville (50–12)	Texas Tech (47–20)	5.
6.	Miami (FL)	LSU (3–0)	Miami (FL) (5–2)	Miami (FL) (9–2)	Miami (FL) (13–3)	Vanderbilt (17–3)	South Carolina (23–2)	TCU (22–5)	Vanderbilt (25–7)	TCU (27–8)	Louisville (31–9)	Vanderbilt (34–10)	Florida State (32–13)	Ole Miss (39–13)	LSU (39–17)	Louisville (47–12)	LSU (45–19)	Florida (52–16)	6.
7.	LSU	Oregon State (2–1)	TCU (6–1)	TCU (9–2)	TCU (12–3)	North Carolina (17–2)	Florida State (18–5)	Florida State (19–6)	South Carolina (28–5)	Mississippi State (24–12–1)	Vanderbilt (30–10)	Florida State (29–12)	Vanderbilt (36–12)	Vanderbilt (37–15)	Vanderbilt (41–15)	Ole Miss (43–17)	TCU (45–15)	UC Santa Barbara (43–20–1)	7.
8.	Virginia	Virginia (2–1)	Oregon (6–1)	Oregon (8–2)	Florida State (13–3)	Louisville (16–4)	TCU (18–5)	Mississippi State (20–8–1)	Louisville (24–7)	LSU (25–11)	South Carolina (33–8)	South Carolina (34–9)	TCU (33–12)	Texas Tech (38–13)	South Carolina (42–13)	Vanderbilt (43–17)	Texas Tech (44–17)	Miami (FL) (50–14)	8.
9.	UCLA	Louisiana–Lafayette (3–0)	Florida State (5–1)	LSU (9–2)	LSU (12–3)	Ole Miss (19–2)	Oregon State (16–5)	South Carolina (24–5)	TCU (24–7)	Florida State (23–11)	TCU (28–10)	NC State (31–12)	Ole Miss (36–13)	LSU (36–16)	Texas Tech (40–14)	TCU (42–15)	South Carolina (46–16)	Texas A&M (49–16)	9.
10.	California	Florida State (3–0)	LSU (5–2)	North Carolina (9–1)	North Carolina (12–2)	Florida State (15–5)	North Carolina (19–4)	California (18–6)	Oregon State (22–7)	NC State (26–10)	NC State (28–11)	TCU (30–12)	South Carolina (36–11)	South Carolina (38–13)	Ole Miss (40–16)	Clemson (42–18)	Florida State (40–20)	Louisville (50–14)	10.
11.	Oklahoma State	Oregon (3–0)	North Carolina (5–1)	Florida State (8–3)	Ole Miss (15–1)	Virginia (15–6)	Mississippi State (17–7–1)	Oregon State (19–7)	Ole Miss (25–7)	South Carolina (29–8)	LSU (27–13)	Ole Miss (33–12)	Texas Tech (37–13)	Florida State (33–17)	Virginia (36–18)	Texas Tech (41–16)	Coastal Carolina (47–16)	Mississippi State (44–18–1)	11.
12.	TCU	Houston (3–0)	Arkansas (8–0)	California (9–3)	Virginia (11–5)	South Carolina (20–2)	California (14–6)	Florida Atlantic (21–4)	LSU (21–10)	Oregon State (23–9)	Oregon State (26–10)	Oregon State (28–12)	NC State (32–14)	Virginia (33–18)	TCU (38–14)	South Carolina (42–15)	Oklahoma State (39–20)	LSU (45–21)	12.
13.	Louisiana–Lafayette	TCU (2–1)	California (5–2)	NC State (10–2)	California (10–4)	LSU (14–5)	Ole Miss (20–5)	North Carolina (20–7)	North Carolina (23–9)	North Carolina (25–11)	Ole Miss (31–10)	UC Santa Barbara (29–10–1)	LSU (31–16)	TCU (34–14)	NC State (34–18)	Florida State (37–20)	UC Santa Barbara (40–18–1)	Florida State (41–22)	13.
14.	Florida State	North Carolina (2–1)	Virginia (4–3)	Virginia (7–4)	Mississippi State (12–3–1)	Mississippi State (14–6–1)	Virginia (17–8)	Ole Miss (21–7)	NC State (22–9)	UC Santa Barbara (24–7–1)	Louisiana–Lafayette (27–13)	Texas Tech (34–13)	Virginia (31–17)	NC State (32–17)	Clemson (38–18)	Virginia (37–20)	Arizona (42–21)	South Carolina (46–18)	14.
15.	Houston	UCLA (1–2)	South Carolina (8–0)	Ole Miss (10–1)	Arkansas (13–3)	Missouri State (17–2)	LSU (16–7)	LSU (18–9)	Missouri State (25–6)	Ole Miss (26–10)	Michigan (28–10)	LSU (28–16)	Oklahoma State (30–15)	Oklahoma State (32–17)	Florida State (34–19)	NC State (35–20)	Clemson (44–20)	East Carolina (38–23–1)	15.
16.	Cal State Fullerton	Oklahoma State (2–2)	NC State (5–2)	Arkansas (10–2)	Oregon (8–5)	NC State (16–6)	Arkansas (18–6)	Missouri State (22-5)	Florida Atlantic (23–6)	Texas Tech (29–9)	UC Santa Barbara (25–10–1)	Virginia (30–17)	UC Santa Barbara (31–12–1)	Clemson (34–18)	Oklahoma State (35–18)	Louisiana–Lafayette (41–19)	East Carolina (37–21–1)	Boston College (35–22)	16.
17.	Oregon	California (1–2)	Louisiana–Lafayette (4–3)	Louisiana–Lafayette (8–4)	South Carolina (15–2)	Clemson (16–3)	Florida Atlantic (18–4)	NC State (19-9)	California (19–9)	Missouri State (27–8)	Texas Tech (31–12)	North Carolina (28–15)	Oregon State (29–15)	North Carolina (32–19)	Louisiana–Lafayette (37–-19)	Coastal Carolina (44–15)	NC State (38–22)	NC State (38–22)	17.
18.	Southern California	Arkansas (3–0)	Ole Miss (6–1)	South Carolina (10–2)	NC State (13–4)	California (11–6)	Oklahoma State (17–7)	Clemson (21-7)	Clemson (23–9)	California (21–11)	Florida Atlantic (28–10)	Oklahoma State (28–15)	Florida Atlantic (33–13)	Southern Miss (36–15)	Florida Atlantic (37–15)	Oklahoma State (36–20)	Vanderbilt (43–19)	Clemson (44–20)	18.
19.	Mississippi State	NC State (2–1)	Mississippi State (6–2)	UCLA (6–5)	Missouri State (12–2)	FAU (15–3)	Missouri State (19–4)	Oklahoma State (19-9)	Georgia Tech (23–8)	Florida Atlantic (25–8)	North Carolina (26–15)	Louisiana–Lafayette (29–16)	Michigan (34–12)	Louisiana–Lafayette (33–19)	UC Santa Barbara (35–16–1)	Southern Miss (40–18)	Ole Miss (43–19)	Vanderbilt (43–19)	19.
20.	NC State	South Carolina (3–0)	UCLA (3–4)	Mississippi State (8–3–1)	Florida Atlantic (13–2)	Arkansas (15–6)	Houston (16–7)	Virginia (18-11)	UC Santa Barbara (21–7–1)	Louisiana–Lafayette (24–12)	Virginia (26–17)	Florida Atlantic (30–12)	North Carolina (30–17)	UC Santa Barbara (32–15–1)	Coastal Carolina (40–15)	Florida Atlantic (38–17)	Boston College (34–20)	Louisiana–Lafayette (43–21)	20.
21.	North Carolina	Michigan (4–0)	Houston (4–3)	Missouri State (9–1)	Louisiana–Lafayette (10–6)	UCLA (11–7)	Georgia Tech (18–5)	Michigan (20-5)	BYU (25–5)	Michigan (25–9)	Oklahoma State (25–14)	Michigan (29–12)	Louisiana–Lafayette (31–17)	Florida Atlantic (34–15)	North Carolina (34–21)	UC Santa Barbara (37–18–1)	Virginia (38–22)	Ole Miss (43–19)	21.
22.	Arkansas	Coastal Carolina (2–1)	Cal State Fullerton (4–2)	Georgia Tech (11–0)	Michigan (11–3)	Oklahoma State (13–7)	UC Santa Barbara (18–4)	BYU (23-3)	Louisiana–Lafayette (21–11)	Virginia (23–15)	Coastal Carolina (30–11)	Georgia Tech (30–14)	Clemson (31–16)	Tulane (35–15)	Tulane (37–17)	Tulane (39–19)	Louisiana–Lafayette (43–21)	Virginia (38–22)	22.
23.	Coastal Carolina	Cal State Fullerton (1–2)	Coastal Carolina (4–2)	Florida Atlantic (9–1)	UCLA (8–7)	Houston (13–6)	NC State (16–8)	UC Santa Barbara (20-6)	Texas Tech (24–9)	Clemson (24–12)	Missouri State (28–10)	Clemson (27–15)	Southern Miss (34–14)	Coastal Carolina (36–15)	Southern Miss (36–18)	Bryant (47–10)	Tulane (41–21)	Tulane (41–21)	23.
24.	South Carolina	Mississippi State (2–2)	Florida Atlantic (7–0)	Cal State Fullerton (6–4)	Oklahoma State (9–6)	Oregon (9–7)	Clemson (17–6)	Arkansas (19-9)	Kentucky (22–9)	BYU (27–7)	California (22–14)	California (24–16)	Georgia Tech (31–15)	Oregon State (30–18)	Oregon State (32–19)	Oregon State (35–19)	Southern Miss (41–20)	Dallas Baptist (44–19)	24.
25.	Michigan	Missouri State (3–0)	East Carolina (6–1)	Houston (6–5)	Clemson (11–3)	Georgia Tech (15–4)	Michigan (16–5)	Georgia Tech (20-7)	Virginia (20–14)	Oklahoma State (22–13)	Georgia Tech (27–13)	Southern Miss (31–14)	Arizona (31–16)	Georgia Tech (33–18)	Georgia Tech (35–20)	North Carolina (34–21)	Dallas Baptist (44–19)	Southern Miss (41–20)	25.
26.	Rice	Dallas Baptist (3–0)	Missouri State (5–1)	Oklahoma State (6–6)	Houston (8–6)	UC Santa Barbara (15–3)	BYU (20–3)	Louisiana–Lafayette (18-10)	Michigan (21–8)	Georgia Tech (24–11)	Clemson (26–14)	BYU (30–10)	Coastal Carolina (34–14)	Michigan (34–16)	Bryant (44–10)	Louisiana Tech (40–18)	Florida Atlantic (39–19)	Rice (38–24)	26.
27.	Maryland	Florida Atlantic (4–0)	Oklahoma State (2–5)	Michigan (7–3)	Cal State Fullerton (9–6)	BYU (18–2)	Louisiana–Lafayette (15–9)	Houston (17-10)	Oklahoma State (19–12)	Rice (24–11)	Arizona (26–14)	Coastal Carolina (31–14)	Rice (31–14)	Cal State Fullerton (32–17)	Louisiana Tech (37–16)	Cal State Fullerton (35–21)	Louisiana Tech (42–20)	Louisiana Tech (42–20)	27.
28.	Missouri State	Ole Miss (3–0)	Michigan (5–2)	East Carolina (8–3)	Georgia Tech (12–3)	Michigan (12–5)	Kentucky (17–6)	Kentucky (20-8)	Southern Miss (25–8)	Coastal Carolina (27–10)	Southern Miss (29–12)	Creighton (30–9)	Creighton (32–10)	Rice (32–16)	Arizona State (33–19)	Dallas Baptist (41–17)	Rice (38–24)	Florida Atlantic (39–19)	28.
29.	Texas	Southern California (3–0)	Georgia Tech (7–0)	Clemson (8–2)	BYU (15–1)	Louisiana–Lafayette (12–8)	UCLA (12–9)	East Carolina (19-9)	South Alabama (25–8)	Kentucky (23–12)	Cal Poly (25–13)	Arizona (28–16)	Tulane (31–14)	Arizona (32–18)	Long Beach State (35–18)	Arizona (38–20)	Cal State Fullerton (36–23)	Cal State Fullerton (36–23)	29.
30.	Oklahoma	Stanford (2–1)	Southern California (4–3)	Alabama (10–2)	UC Santa Barbara (12–3)	Alabama (13–6)	Oregon (11–9)	College of Charleston (20-8)	Houston (19–12)	Michigan State (25–7)	BYU (28–9)	Michigan State (30–11)	Washington (27–16)	Arizona State (31–17)	BYU (37–15)	Georgia Tech (36–23)	Georgia Tech (38–25)	Georgia Tech (38–25)	30.
	Preseason Feb 1	Week 1 Feb 22	Week 2 Feb 29	Week 3 Mar 7	Week 4 Mar 14	Week 5 Mar 21	Week 6 Mar 28	Week 7 Apr 4	Week 8 Apr 11	Week 9 Apr 18	Week 10 Apr 25	Week 11 May 2	Week 12 May 9	Week 13 May 16	Week 14 May 23	Week 15 May 30	Week 16 June 8	Week 18 June 30	
		Dropped: 26. Rice; 27. Maryland; 29. Texas; 30. Oklahoma	Dropped: 26. Dallas Baptist; 30. Stanford	Dropped: 23. Coastal Carolina; 30. Southern California	Dropped: 28. East Carolina; 30. Alabama	Dropped: 27. Cal State Fullerton	Dropped: 30. Alabama	Dropped: 29. UCLA; 30. Oregon	Dropped: 24. Arkansas; 29. East Carolina; 30 .College of Charleston	Dropped: 28. Southern Miss; 29. South Alabama; 30. Houston	Dropped: 27. Rice; 29. Kentucky; 30. Michigan State	Dropped: 23. Missouri State; 29. Cal Poly	Dropped: 24. California; 26. BYU; 30. Michigan State	Dropped: 28. Creighton; 30. Washington	Dropped: 26. Michigan; 27. Cal State Fullerton; 28. Rice; 29. Arizona	Dropped: 28. Arizona State; 29. Long Beach State; 30. BYU	Dropped: 23. Bryant; 24. Oregon State; 25. North Carolina	None	

The Preseason poll ranked the top 35 teams in the nation. Teams not listed above are: 31. Dallas Baptist; 32. Kentucky; 33. Ole Miss; 34. College of Charleston; 35. Tulane.
