= 2016 South Carolina Gamecocks baseball team =

American college baseball season

2016 South Carolina Gamecocks baseball

SEC Eastern Division champion Columbia Regional Champion

Columbia Super Regional, 0–2
- Conference: Southeastern Conference

Ranking
- Coaches: No. 14
- CB: No. 12
- Record: 46–18 (20–9 SEC)
- Head coach: Chad Holbrook (4th season)
- Assistant coaches: Jerry Meyers (6th/14th season); Sammy Esposito (9th season); Brian Buscher (5th/6th season)
- Home stadium: Founders Park

2016 Southeastern Conference baseball standings
	Conf.						Overall
Team	W		L		T	PCT	W		L		T	PCT
Eastern
No. 12 South Carolina ^{x}‍‍‍^{y}	20	–	9	–	0	.690	46	–	18	–	0	.719
No. 7 Florida ‍‍‍^{y}	19	–	10	–	0	.655	52	–	16	–	0	.765
No. 23 Vanderbilt ‍‍‍^{y}	18	–	12	–	0	.600	43	–	19	–	0	.694
Kentucky ‍‍‍	15	–	15	–	0	.500	32	–	25	–	0	.561
Georgia ‍‍‍	11	–	19	–	0	.367	27	–	30	–	0	.474
Tennessee ‍‍‍	9	–	21	–	0	.300	29	–	28	–	0	.509
Missouri ‍‍‍	9	–	21	–	0	.300	26	–	30	–	0	.464
Western
No. 10 Mississippi State ^{x}‍†‍‍^{y}	21	–	9	–	0	.700	44	–	18	–	1	.706
No. 9 Texas A&M ‍‍‡‍^{y}	20	–	10	–	0	.667	49	–	16	–	0	.754
No. 13 LSU ‍‍‍^{y}	19	–	11	–	0	.633	45	–	21	–	0	.682
Ole Miss ‍‍‍^{y}	18	–	12	–	0	.600	43	–	19	–	0	.694
Alabama ‍‍‍	15	–	15	–	0	.500	32	–	26	–	0	.552
Auburn ‍‍‍	8	–	22	–	0	.267	23	–	33	–	0	.411
Arkansas ‍‍‍	7	–	23	–	0	.233	26	–	29	–	0	.473
x – Division champion † – Conference champion ‡ – Tournament champion y – Invited to the NCAA tournament Rankings from Collegiate Baseball

The 2016 South Carolina Gamecocks baseball team represented the University of South Carolina in the 2016 NCAA Division I baseball season. The Gamecocks played their home games in Carolina Stadium. The team was coached by Chad Holbrook, who was in his fourth season as head coach at Carolina.

== Personnel ==
=== Roster ===
2016 South Carolina Gamecocks active roster
Pitchers: 6 – Clarke Schmidt – Sophomore; 9 – Brandon Murray – Sophomore; 13 – Colton Provey – Junior; 15 – Adam Hill – Freshman; 16 – Harrison Smith – Freshman; 17 – Taylor Widener – Junior; 18 – Tyler Haswell – Sophomore; 21 – Tyler Johnson – Sophomore; 23 – Vince Fiori – Senior; 24 – Alex Destino – Sophomore; 26 – Matthew Vogel – Junior; 27 – Hayden Hefline – Junior; 28 – John Parke – Junior; 30 – Braden Webb – Freshman; 32 – Canaan Cropper – Sophomore; 35 – Kyle Anderson – Freshman; 37 – Wil Crowe – Junior; 39 – Reed Scott – Junior; 40 – Colie Bowers – Junior; 46 – Dillon Hodge – Junior; 47 – Josh Reagan – Junior; 49 – Hank Nichols – Freshman; Catchers: 22 – John Jones – Sophomore; 33 – Chris Cullen – Freshman; 38 – Hunter Taylor – Sophomore	Infielders: 7 – DC Arendas – Senior; 8 – Marcus Mooney – Senior; 11 – LT Tolbert – Freshman; 14 – Madison Stokes – Sophomore; 20 – Jonah Bride – Sophomore; 24 – Alex Destino – Sophomore; 25 – Ross Grosvenor – Junior; 34 – Collin Steagall – Senior; 45 – Caleb Whitenton – Freshman; 48 – Matt Williams – Sophomore; Outfielders: 3 – Jared Williams – Freshman; 4 – Danny Blair – Freshman; 5 – T.J. Hopkins – Freshman; 10 – Clark Scolamiero – Sophomore; 19 – Gene Cone – Junior; 31 – Weber Pike – Junior; 42 – Dom Thompson-Williams – Junior; 44 – Brandon McIlwain – Freshman

2016 South Carolina Gamecocks Baseball Roster & Bios

=== Coaching staff ===
2016 South Carolina Gamecocks baseball coaching staff
- 2 Chad Holbrook – Head coach – 4 years
- 12 Jerry Meyers – Associate head coach – 6 years / 14 years
- 41 Sammy Esposito – Assistant coach – 9 years
- 55 Brian Buscher – Volunteer assistant coach – 5 years / 6 years

2016 South Carolina Gamecocks Baseball Coaches & Bios

== Schedule ==
2016 South Carolina Gamecocks baseball game log
Regular season
February

Date	Opponent	Site/stadium	Rank	Score	Win	Loss	Save	Attendance	Overall Record	SEC Record
February 19	Albany	Founders Park • Columbia, SC		W 10–1	Schmidt (1–0)	Woods (0–1)	None	7,434	1–0	
February 20	Albany	Founders Park • Columbia, SC		W 6–2	Webb (1–0)	Failing (0–1)	Reagan (1)	7,825	2–0	
February 21	Albany	Founders Park • Columbia, SC		W 8–1	Bowers (1–0)	Romero (0–1)	None	7,221	3–0	
February 23	Appalachian State	Founders Park • Columbia, SC		W 5–0	Hill (1–0)	Gorham (0–1)	None	6,423	4–0	
February 24	Winthrop	Founders Park • Columbia, SC		W 16–4	Haswell (1–0)	Sultan (0–1)	None	6,523	5–0	
February 26	Penn State	Founders Park • Columbia, SC		W 7–1	Schmidt (2–0)	Lehman (0–2)	None	7,014	6–0	
February 27	Penn State	Founders Park • Columbia, SC		W 16–5	Webb (2–0)	Biasi (1–1)	None	7,668	7–0	
February 28	Penn State	Founders Park • Columbia, SC		W 4–2	Scott (1–0)	Hagenman (1–1)	Reagan (2)	7,804	8–0	

March

Date	Opponent	Site/stadium	Rank	Score	Win	Loss	Save	Attendance	Overall Record	SEC Record
March 1	at The Citadel	Riley Park • Charleston, SC		W 6–3	Hill (2–0)	Watcher (1–1)	Reagan (3)	6,298	9–0	
March 4	Clemson	Founders Park • Columbia, SC		W 8–1	Schmidt (3–0)	Barnes (1–1)	None	8,242	10–0	
March 5	Clemson	Fluor Field • Greenville, SC		L 5–0	Schmidt (3–0)	Webb (2–1)	Krall (1)	7,216	10–1	
March 6	at Clemson	Doug Kingsmore Stadium • Clemson, SC		L 4–1	Eubanks (2–1)	Widener (0–1)	Bostic (1)	6,524	10–2	
March 8	Wofford	Founders Park • Columbia, SC		W 7–1	Hill (3–0)	Higginbotham (0–2)	None	6,432	11–2	
March 9	Furman	Founders Park • Columbia, SC		W 5–4	Haswell (2–0)	Dvorak (0–1)	Reagan (4)	6,325	12–2	
March 11	Charleston Southern	Founders Park • Columbia, SC		W 9–0	Schmidt (4–0)	Raynor (3–1)	None	6,670	13–2	
March 12	Charleston Southern	Founders Park • Columbia, SC		W 5–4	Webb (3–1)	Johnson (2–2)	Reagan (5)	7,412	14–2	
March 13	Charleston Southern	Founders Park • Columbia, SC		W 2–0	Hill (4–0)	Piriz (0–2)	Reagan (6)	6,643	15–2	
March 15	USC Upstate	Fluor Field • Greenville, SC		W 12–6	Murray (1–0)	Jackson (2–2)	None	2,005	16–2	
March 16	Davidson	Founders Park • Columbia, SC		W 15–2	Vogel (1–0)	Roberts (0–2)	None	6,525	17–2	
March 18	Arkansas	Founders Park • Columbia, SC		W 10–6	Schmidt (5–0)	Taccolini (3–1)	None	7,511	18–2	1–0
March 19	Arkansas	Founders Park • Columbia, SC		W 6–2	Webb (4–1)	Teague (2–2)	Johnson (1)	7,258	19–2	2–0
March 20	Arkansas	Founders Park • Columbia, SC		W 8–6	Reagan (1–0)	Jackson (1–2)	None	6,867	20–2	3–0
March 24	at Ole Miss	Swayze Field • Oxford, Mississippi	#18	W 5–1	Schmidt (6–0)	Bramlett (4–1)	Reagan (7)	8,167	21–2	4–0
March 25	at Ole Miss	Swayze Field • Oxford, MS	#18	W 9–5	Webb (5–1)	Smith (2–2)	None	9,064	22–2	5–0
March 26	at Ole Miss	Swayze Field • Oxford, MS	#18	W 4–0	Hill (5–0)	Pagnozzi (4–1)	Johnson (2)	10,184	23–2	6–0
March 26	College of Charleston	Founders Park • Columbia, SC	#18	L 5–6^{13}	Love (1–1)	Scott (1–1)	Hunt (1)	8,242	23–3	
March 26	at Vanderbilt	Hawkins Field • Nashville, TN	#18	L 3–6	Sheffield (4–1)	Schmidt (6–1)	Bowden (3)	3,384	23–4	6–1

April

Date	Opponent	Site/stadium	Rank	Score	Win	Loss	Save	Attendance	Overall Record	SEC Record
April 1	at Vanderbilt	Hawkins Field • Nashville, TN	#7							
April 2			#7							
April 5			#8							
April 8			#8							
April 9			#8							
April 10			#8							
April 13			#5							
April 15			#5							
April 16			#5							
April 17			#5							
April 20			#12							
April 22			#12							
April 23			#12							
April 24			#12							
April 29			#6							
April 30			#6							

May

Date	Opponent	Site/stadium	Score	Win	Loss	Save	Attendance	Overall Record	SEC Record

Postseason
SEC Tournament

Date	Opponent	Site/stadium	Score	Win	Loss	Save	Attendance	Overall Record	SECT Record

== Record vs. conference opponents ==
Last two do not qualify for conf. tourn. Blank are not scheduled. Blue are home games, otherwise away.

2016 SEC baseball records Source: 2016 SEC baseball game results
Team	W–L	ALA	ARK	AUB	FLA	UGA	KEN	LSU	MSU	MIZZ	MISS	SCAR	TENN	TAMU	VAN	Team	Div	SR	SW
ALA	15–15		3–0	2–1	.	1–2	1–2	2–1	1–2	.	2–1	0–3	2–1	1–2	.	ALA	W5	5–5	1–1
ARK	7–23	0–3		3–0	0–3	.	2–1	0–3	0–3	1–2	0–3	0–3	.	1–2	.	ARK	W7	2–8	1–6
AUB	8–22	1–2	0–3		.	.	2–1	1–2	0–3	1–2	0–3	.	2–1	1–2	0–3	AUB	W6	2–8	0–4
FLA	19–10	.	3–0	.		2–1	1–2	1–2	1–2	3–0	.	1–1	2–1	3–0	2–1	FLA	E2	6–3	3–0
UGA	11–19	2–1	.	.	1–2		1–2	.	1–2	2–1	1–2	2–1	1–2	0–3	0–3	UGA	E5	3–7	0–2
KEN	15–15	2–1	1–2	1–2	2–1	2–1		.	.	2–1	0–3	2–1	2–1	.	1–2	KEN	E4	6–4	0–1
LSU	19–11	1–2	3–0	2–1	2–1	.	.		1–2	3–0	1–2	.	3–0	1–2	2–1	LSU	W3	6–4	3–0
MSU	21–9	2–1	3–0	3–0	2–1	2–1	.	2–1		3–0	2–1	.	.	0–3	2–1	MSU	W1	9–1	3–1
MIZZ	9–21	.	2–1	2–1	0–3	1–2	1–2	0–3	0–3		.	0–3	3–0	.	0–3	MIZZ	E7	2–8	1–4
MISS	18–12	1–2	3–0	3–0	.	2–1	3–0	2–1	1–2	.		0–3	2–1	1–2	.	MISS	W4	6–4	3–1
SCAR	20–9	3–0	3–0	.	1–1	1–2	1–2	.	.	3–0	3–0		3–0	1–2	1–2	SCAR	E1	5–4	5–0
TENN	9–21	1–2	.	1–2	1–2	2–1	1–2	0–3	.	0–3	1–2	0–3		.	2–1	TENN	E6	2–8	0–3
TAMU	20–10	2–1	2–1	2–1	0–3	3–0	.	2–1	3–0	.	2–1	2–1	.		2–1	TAMU	W2	9–1	2–1
VAN	18–12	.	.	3–0	1–2	3–0	2–1	1–2	1–2	3–0	.	2–1	1–2	1–2		VAN	E3	5–5	3–0
Team	W–L	ALA	ARK	AUB	FLA	UGA	KEN	LSU	MSU	MIZZ	MISS	SCAR	TENN	TAMU	VAN	Team	Div	SR	SW

Updated for entire regular season.

=== Rankings ===
Ranking movements Legend: ██ Increase in ranking ██ Decrease in ranking — = Not ranked
	Week																		
Poll	Pre	1	2	3	4	5	6	7	8	9	10	11	12	13	14	15	16	17	Final
Coaches'	23	23*	16	12	10	6	7	5	8	5	7	8	8	10	9	13	13	13	14
Baseball America	—	—	—	—	—	18	7	8	5	12	6	6	8	10	9	14	14	14	14
Collegiate Baseball^	—	—	20	21	20	13	2	6	2	4	2	2	3	6	4	6	6	12	12
NCBWA†	24	20	15	18	17	12	6	9	7	11	8	8	10	10	8	12	9	14	14

^ Collegiate Baseball ranked 40 teams in their preseason poll, but only ranked 30 teams weekly during the season.
† NCBWA ranks 30 teams in their preseason poll, but only ranks 25 teams weekly during the season.
* A new poll was not released for this week, so for comparison purposes, the previous week's ranking is inserted in this week's slot.

== Gamecocks in the 2016 MLB draft ==
The following members of the South Carolina Gamecocks baseball program were drafted in the 2016 Major League Baseball draft.

Player	Position	Round	Overall	MLB team
