= 2016 Texas A&M Aggies baseball team =

American college baseball season

2016 Texas A&M Aggies baseball

SEC tournament champions College Station Regional champions
- Conference: Southeastern Conference
- Western Division

Ranking
- Coaches: No. 2
- Record: 49–16 (20–10 SEC)
- Head coach: Rob Childress (11th season)
- Assistant coaches: Justin Seely (7th season); Will Bolt (2nd season)
- Home stadium: Olsen Field at Blue Bell Park

2016 Southeastern Conference baseball standings
	Conf.						Overall
Team	W		L		T	PCT	W		L		T	PCT
Eastern
No. 12 South Carolina ^{x}‍‍‍^{y}	20	–	9	–	0	.690	46	–	18	–	0	.719
No. 7 Florida ‍‍‍^{y}	19	–	10	–	0	.655	52	–	16	–	0	.765
No. 23 Vanderbilt ‍‍‍^{y}	18	–	12	–	0	.600	43	–	19	–	0	.694
Kentucky ‍‍‍	15	–	15	–	0	.500	32	–	25	–	0	.561
Georgia ‍‍‍	11	–	19	–	0	.367	27	–	30	–	0	.474
Tennessee ‍‍‍	9	–	21	–	0	.300	29	–	28	–	0	.509
Missouri ‍‍‍	9	–	21	–	0	.300	26	–	30	–	0	.464
Western
No. 10 Mississippi State ^{x}‍†‍‍^{y}	21	–	9	–	0	.700	44	–	18	–	1	.706
No. 9 Texas A&M ‍‍‡‍^{y}	20	–	10	–	0	.667	49	–	16	–	0	.754
No. 13 LSU ‍‍‍^{y}	19	–	11	–	0	.633	45	–	21	–	0	.682
Ole Miss ‍‍‍^{y}	18	–	12	–	0	.600	43	–	19	–	0	.694
Alabama ‍‍‍	15	–	15	–	0	.500	32	–	26	–	0	.552
Auburn ‍‍‍	8	–	22	–	0	.267	23	–	33	–	0	.411
Arkansas ‍‍‍	7	–	23	–	0	.233	26	–	29	–	0	.473
x – Division champion † – Conference champion ‡ – Tournament champion y – Invited to the NCAA tournament Rankings from Collegiate Baseball

The 2016 Texas A&M Aggies baseball team represented the Texas A&M University in the 2016 NCAA Division I baseball season. The Aggies played their home games at Olsen Field at Blue Bell Park.

== Personnel ==
=== Roster ===
2016 Texas A&M Aggies roster
Pitchers: 10 Andrew Vinson – Senior; 12 Corbin Martin – Sophomore; 14 Kyle Simonds – Senior; 15 Brigham Hill – Sophomore; 21 Cason Sherrod – Sophomore; 22 Tyler Ivey – Freshman; 23 Tuner Larkins – Sophomore; 27 Ryan Hendrix – Junior; 28 Mark Ecker – Junior; 32 Stephen Kolek – Freshman; 34 Mitchell Kilkenny – Freshman; 36 Ty Schlottmann – Senior; 38 Jace Vines – Sophomore; 41 Lee May Gonzalez – Junior; 45 Dakota Klein – Freshman; 47 Hunter Spaeth – Freshman; 56 Kaylor Chafin – Sophomore	Catchers: 5 Michael Barash – Senior; 20 Dayne Sommer – Sophomore; 54 Cole Bedford – Freshman; Infielders: 2 Ryan Birk – Junior; 3 Alan Campero – Freshman; 17 Joel Davis – Junior; 25 Austin Homan – Junior; 33 Ronnie Gideon – Junior; 42 Tristan Metten – Freshman; 44 George Janca – Freshman; 50 Hunter Melton – Senior	Outfielders: 4 Nick Banks – Junior; 9 Walker Pennington – Junior; 11 J.B. Moss – Senior; 13 Blake Kopetsky – Senior; 18 Nick Choruby – Junior; 31 Trey Jimmerson – Freshman; 35 Matt Collins – Freshman; 37 Coll Stanley – Freshman; 40 Jonathan Moroney – Senior; Utility: 8 Boomer White – Senior

=== Coaching staff ===
2016 Texas A&M baseball coaching staff
- Rob Childress – Head coach – 11th year
- Justin Seely – Assistant coach – 7th year
- Will Bolt – Assistant coach – 2nd year
- Jake Carlson – Volunteer assistant coach – 1st year
- Jason Hutchins – Director of baseball operations – 18th year
- Jeremy McMillan – Sports performance coach – 5th year

== Schedule and results ==
2016 Texas A&M Aggies baseball game log
Regular season (41–13)

February (7–1)
Date	Opponent	Rank	Site/stadium	Score	Win	Loss	Save	TV	Attendance	Overall record	SEC record
Feb. 19	Hofstra	#5	Blue Bell Park	W 5–2	Kyle Simmons (1–0)	Alec Eisenberg (0–1)	Ryan Hendrix (1)	SECN+	6,806	1–0	–
Feb. 20	Hofstra	#5	Blue Bell Park	W 15–4	Corbin Martin (1–0)	Chris Weiss (0–1)	none	SECN+	5,120	2–0	–
Feb. 21	Hofstra	#5	Blue Bell Park	W 5–0	Tyler Ivey (1–0)	Bowie Matteson (0–1)	none	SECN+	3,980	3–0	–
Feb. 23	Stephen F. Austin	#5	Blue Bell Park	W 21–1	Jace Vines (1–0)	Austin Hagy (0–1)	none	SECN+	3,585	4–0	–
Feb. 24	Prairie View A&M	#5	Blue Bell Park	W 11–0	Kaylor Chafin (1–0)	Edward Robledo (0–1)	none	SECN+	3,418	5–0	–
Feb. 26	at Pepperdine	#5	Eddy D. Field Stadium	L 5–7	A. J. Puckett (1–1)	Andrew Vinson (0–1)	Max Gamboa (1)		509	5–1	–
Feb. 27	at Pepperdine	#5	Eddy D. Field Stadium	W 6–0	Kyle Simmons (2–0)	Kiki Garcia (1–1)	none		598	6–1	–
Feb. 28	at Pepperdine	#5	Eddy D. Field Stadium	W 4–0	Tyler Ivey (2–0)	Chandler Blanchard (1–1)	Jace Vines (1)		711	7–1	–

March (15–2)
Date	Opponent	Rank	Site/stadium	Score	Win	Loss	Save	TV	Attendance	Overall record	SEC record
Mar. 1	Houston Baptist	#3	Blue Bell Park	W 3–2^{13}	Cason Sherrod (1–0)	Matt Harding (1–1)	none	SECN+	3,934	8–1	–
Mar. 4	Yale	#3	Blue Bell Park	W 12–5	Jace Vines (2–0)	Mason Kukowski (0–1)	none	SECN+	6,262	9–1	–
Mar. 5	Yale	#3	Blue Bell Park	W 13–0	Brigham Hill (1–0)	Scott Politz (0–1)	none	SECN+	7,322	10–1	–
Mar. 6	Yale	#3	Blue Bell Park	W 10–2	Turner Larkins (1–0)	Kumar Nambiar (0–1)	none	SECN+	5,068	11–1	–
Mar. 8	Northwestern State	#3	Blue Bell Park	W 7–6	Brigham Hill (2–0)	Nathan Aultman (1–1)	Ryan Hendrix (2)	SECN+	3,502	12–1	–
Mar. 11	Fresno State	#3	Blue Bell Park	W 3–2	Jace Vines (3–0)	Ricky Tyler Thomas (2–1)	Ryan Hendrix (3)	SECN+		13–1	–
Mar. 12	Fresno State	#3	Blue Bell Park	W 4–3^{10}	Ty Schlottmann (1–0)	Tim Borst (0–1)	none	SECN+	5,020	14–1	–
Mar. 13	Fresno State	#3	Blue Bell Park	W 12–1	Kyle Simonds (3–0)	Antony Arias (2–1)	none	SECN+	4,656	15–1	–
Mar. 15	Texas	#3	Blue Bell Park	W 5–4	Mark Ecker (1–0)	Ty Culbreth (2–2)	none	SECN+	6,965	16–1	–
Mar. 19	at Auburn	#3	Plainsman Park	W 12–8	Mark Ecker (2–0)	Marc Frazier (0–2)	none	SECN		17–1	1–0
Mar. 19	at Auburn	#3	Plainsman Park	L 7–9	Gabe Klobosits (1–1)	Martin Corbin (1–1)	none	SECN	3,614	17–2	1–1
Mar. 20	at Auburn	#3	Plainsman Park	W 12–10	Kyle Simonds (4–0)	Cole Lipscomb (1–2)	Ryan Hendrix (4)	SECN+	2,840	18–2	2–1
Mar. 22	Texas A&M–Corpus Christi	#4	Blue Bell Park	W 13–3^{7}	Stephen Kolek (1–0)	Dalton D'Spain (0–3)	none	SECN+	3,776	19–2	–
Mar. 24	#15 LSU	#4	Blue Bell Park	W 6–1	Jace Vines (4–0)	Jared Poche' (2–3)	Brigham Hill (1)	SECN	4,477	20–2	3–1
Mar. 25	#15 LSU	#4	Blue Bell Park	L 2–3	Caleb Gilbert (3–1)	Mark Ecker (2–1)	none	SECN	6,436	20–3	3–2
Mar. 26	#15 LSU	#4	Blue Bell Park	W 3–1	Kyle Simonds (5–0)	John Valek III (4–1)	Ryan Hendrix (5)	SECN+	6,181	21–3	4–2
Mar. 29	at Houston	#3	Schroeder Park	W 7–2	Brigham Hill (3–0)	Jon King (3–2)	Mark Ecker (1)		3,186	22–3	–

April (12–6)
Date	Opponent	Rank	Site/stadium	Score	Win	Loss	Save	TV	Attendance	Overall record	SEC record
April 1	at #1 Florida	#3	McKethan Stadium	L 4–7	Kirby Snead (2–0)	Tyler Ivey (2–1)	Shaun Anderson (5)	SECN+	5,197	22–4	4–3
April 2	at #1 Florida	#3	McKethan Stadium	L 2–7	Alex Faedo (6–0)	Kyle Simonds (5–1)	Dane Dunning (2)	ESPNU	5,339	22–5	4–4
April 3	at #1 Florida	#3	McKethan Stadium	L 7–10	Kirby Snead (3–0)	Ryan Hendrix (0–1)	Shaun Anderson (6)	ESPNU	4,824	22–6	4–5
April 5	at Rice	#7	Reckling Park	L 3–4	Glenn Otto (3–1)	Tyler Ivey (2–2)	none		5,478	22–7	–
April 8	Georgia	#7	Blue Bell Park	W 5–0	Brigham Hill (4–0)	Robert Tyler (3–2)	Andrew Vinson (1)	SECN+	6,322	23–7	5–5
April 9	Georgia	#7	Blue Bell Park	W 15–1	Jace Vines (5–0)	Connor Jones (4–2)	none	SECN+	6,318	24–7	6–5
April 10	Georgia	#7	Blue Bell Park	W 10–2	Kyle Simonds (6–1)	Bo Tucker (3–3)	none	SECN+	5,673	25–7	7–5
April 12	Abilene Christian	#8	Blue Bell Park	W 10–4	Mitchell Kilkenny (1–0)	Nate Cole (1–4)	none	SECN+	3,734	26–7	–
April 15	at #5 Mississippi State	#8	Dudy Noble Field	W 10–3	Brigham Hill (5–0)	Dakota Hudson (4–3)	none	SECN+	10,032	27–7	8–5
April 16	at #5 Mississippi State	#8	Dudy Noble Field	W 10–6	Jace Vines (6–0)	Austin Sexton (3–2)	Mark Ecker (2)	SECN+	15,078	28–7	9–5
April 17	at #5 Mississippi State	#8	Dudy Noble Field	W 10–5	Mitchell Kilkenny (2–0)	Reid Humphreys (0–1)	none	SECN+	8,786	29–7	10–5
April 19	Texas State	#5	Blue Bell Park	W 14–1	Stephen Kolek (2–0)	Jonathan Hennigan (2–2)	none	SECN+	3,982	30–7	–
April 22	Alabama	#5	Blue Bell Park	W 4–3^{10}	Mark Ecker (3–1)	Dylan Duarte (2–2)	none	SECN+	5,905	31–7	11–5
April 23	Alabama	#5	Blue Bell Park	L 4–7	Jake Walters (4–3)	Jace Vines (6–1)	none	SECN+	6,543	31–8	11–6
April 24	Alabama	#5	Blue Bell Park	W 2–1	Andrew Vinson (1–1)	Matt Foster (4–3)	none	SECN+	5,936	32–8	12–6
April 26	Texas–Arlington	#5	Blue Bell Park	W 7–3	Turner Larkins (2–0)	Matt Michalski (1–3)	Cason Sherrod (1)	SECN+	3,495	33–8	–
April 30	at Arkansas	#5	Baum Stadium	L 5–9	Dominic Taccolini (5–2)	Andrew Vinson (1–2)	none	ESPN2		33–9	12–7
April 30	at Arkansas	#5	Baum Stadium	W 11–8^{11}	Mark Ecker (4–1)	Blian Knight (2–1)	Turner Larkins (1)	SECN+	9,752	34–9	13–7

May (7–4)
Date	Opponent	Rank	Site/stadium	Score	Win	Loss	Save	TV	Attendance	Overall record	SEC record
May 1	at Arkansas	#5	Baum Stadium	W 6–2	Kyle Simonds (7–1)	Keaton McKinney (1–3)	none	ESPNU	8,326	35–9	14–7
May 5	#6 Vanderbilt	#5	Blue Bell Park	W 1–0	Andrew Vinson (2–2)	Jordan Sheffield (7–3)	Mark Ecker (3)	ESPN2	4,482	36–9	15–7
May 6	#6 Vanderbilt	#5	Blue Bell Park	L 6–1	Kyle Wright (6–3)	Brigham Hill (5–1)	none	SECN+	6,054	36–10	15–8
May 7	#6 Vanderbilt	#5	Blue Bell Park	W 3–0	Kyle Simonds (8–1)	Patrick Raby (6–1)	none	SECN	6,550	37–10	16–8
May 13	at #3 South Carolina	#5	Carolina Stadium	W 3–0	Brigham Hill (6–1)	Clarke Schmidt (9–2)	Mark Ecker (4)	SECN+	7,702	38–10	17–8
May 14	at #3 South Carolina	#5	Carolina Stadium	W 5–2	Andrew Vinson (3–2)	Branden Webb (9–4)	none	SECN	8,242	39–10	18–8
May 15	at #3 South Carolina	#5	Carolina Stadium	L 7–10	Josh Reagan (2–2)	Kyle Simonds (8–2)	Tyler Johnson (6)	SECN	7,815	39–11	18–9
May 17	Sam Houston State	#3	Blue Bell Park	L 0–5	Dakota Mills (2–1)	Tyler Ivey (2–3)	none	SECN+	4,389	39–12	–
May 19	#12 Ole Miss	#3	Blue Bell Park	W 6–1	Brigham Hill (7–1)	Brady Bramlett (7–3)	none	SECN+	4,494	40–12	19–9
May 20	#12 Ole Miss	#3	Blue Bell Park	W 11–5	Stephen Kolek (3–0)	David Parkinson (4–3)	Andrew Vinson (2)	SECN+	5,876	41–12	20–9
May 21	#12 Ole Miss	#3	Blue Bell Park	L 2–3	Will Stokes (2–0)	Kyle Simonds (8–3)	Wyatt Short (11)	SECN	6,559	41–13	20–10

Postseason (8–3)

SEC Tournament (4–1)
Date	Opponent	Rank	Site/stadium	Score	Win	Loss	Save	TV	Attendance	Overall record	SECT Record
May 25	#10 Vanderbilt	#5	Hoover Metropolitan Stadium	L 5–6	Matt Ruppenthal (5–1)	Mark Ecker (4–2)	none	SECN	5,637	41–14	0–1
May 26	#4 South Carolina	#5	Hoover Metropolitan Stadium	W 4–1	Brigham Hill (8–1)	Branden Webb (10–5)	Mark Ecker (5)	SECN	5,232	42–14	1–1
May 27	#10 Vanderbilt	#5	Hoover Metropolitan Stadium	W 13–3^{7}	Kyle Simonds (8–3)	Kyle Wright (8–4)	none	SECN	9,429	43–14	2–1
May 28	#16 Ole Miss	#5	Hoover Metropolitan Stadium	W 12–8	Corbin Martin (2–1)	Wyatt Short (2–2)	Mark Ecker (6)	SECN	13,821	44–14	3–1
May 29	#6 Florida	#5	Hoover Metropolitan Stadium	W 12–5	Andrew Vinson (4–2)	Michael Byrne (0–1)	none	ESPN2	8,352	45–14	4–1

NCAA College Station Regional (3–0)
Date	Opponent	Rank	Site/stadium	Score	Win	Loss	Save	TV	Attendance	Overall record	NCAAT record
June 3	Binghamton	#1	Blue Bell Park	W 4–2	Kyle Simonds (10–3)	Mike Bunal (8–4)	Mark Ecker (7)	SECN	5,754	46–14	1–0
June 4	Wake Forest	#1	Blue Bell Park	W 22–2	Brigham Hill (9–1)	Drew Loepprich (3–2)	none	SECN	5,865	47–14	2–0
June 5	Minnesota	#1	Blue Bell Park	W 8–2	Turner Larkins (3–0)	Matt Fiedler (7–4)	Mark Ecker (8)	SECN	5,844	48–14	3–0

NCAA College Station Super Regional (1–2)
Date	Opponent	Rank	Site/stadium	Score	Win	Loss	Save	TV	Attendance	Overall record	NCAAT record
June 10	#10 TCU	#1	Blue Bell Park	L 2–8	Jared Janczak (7–3)	Brigham Hill (9–2)	none	ESPN2	6,109	48–15	3–1
June 11	#10 TCU	#1	Blue Bell Park	W 7–1	Kyle Simonds (11–3)	Mitchell Traver (1–2)	none	ESPN	6,073	49–15	4–1
June 12	#10 TCU	#1	Blue Bell Park	L 1–4	Brian Howard (9–2)	Andrew Vinson (4–3)	Durbin Feltman (8)	ESPN2	6,068	49–16	4–2

† Indicates the game does not count toward the 2016 Southeastern Conference standings.
*Rankings are based on the team's current ranking in the Collegiate Baseball poll.

== Record vs. conference opponents ==
Last two do not qualify for conf. tourn. Blank are not scheduled. Blue are home games, otherwise away.

2016 SEC baseball records Source: 2016 SEC baseball game results
Team	W–L	ALA	ARK	AUB	FLA	UGA	KEN	LSU	MSU	MIZZ	MISS	SCAR	TENN	TAMU	VAN	Team	Div	SR	SW
ALA	15–15		3–0	2–1	.	1–2	1–2	2–1	1–2	.	2–1	0–3	2–1	1–2	.	ALA	W5	5–5	1–1
ARK	7–23	0–3		3–0	0–3	.	2–1	0–3	0–3	1–2	0–3	0–3	.	1–2	.	ARK	W7	2–8	1–6
AUB	8–22	1–2	0–3		.	.	2–1	1–2	0–3	1–2	0–3	.	2–1	1–2	0–3	AUB	W6	2–8	0–4
FLA	19–10	.	3–0	.		2–1	1–2	1–2	1–2	3–0	.	1–1	2–1	3–0	2–1	FLA	E2	6–3	3–0
UGA	11–19	2–1	.	.	1–2		1–2	.	1–2	2–1	1–2	2–1	1–2	0–3	0–3	UGA	E5	3–7	0–2
KEN	15–15	2–1	1–2	1–2	2–1	2–1		.	.	2–1	0–3	2–1	2–1	.	1–2	KEN	E4	6–4	0–1
LSU	19–11	1–2	3–0	2–1	2–1	.	.		1–2	3–0	1–2	.	3–0	1–2	2–1	LSU	W3	6–4	3–0
MSU	21–9	2–1	3–0	3–0	2–1	2–1	.	2–1		3–0	2–1	.	.	0–3	2–1	MSU	W1	9–1	3–1
MIZZ	9–21	.	2–1	2–1	0–3	1–2	1–2	0–3	0–3		.	0–3	3–0	.	0–3	MIZZ	E7	2–8	1–4
MISS	18–12	1–2	3–0	3–0	.	2–1	3–0	2–1	1–2	.		0–3	2–1	1–2	.	MISS	W4	6–4	3–1
SCAR	20–9	3–0	3–0	.	1–1	1–2	1–2	.	.	3–0	3–0		3–0	1–2	1–2	SCAR	E1	5–4	5–0
TENN	9–21	1–2	.	1–2	1–2	2–1	1–2	0–3	.	0–3	1–2	0–3		.	2–1	TENN	E6	2–8	0–3
TAMU	20–10	2–1	2–1	2–1	0–3	3–0	.	2–1	3–0	.	2–1	2–1	.		2–1	TAMU	W2	9–1	2–1
VAN	18–12	.	.	3–0	1–2	3–0	2–1	1–2	1–2	3–0	.	2–1	1–2	1–2		VAN	E3	5–5	3–0
Team	W–L	ALA	ARK	AUB	FLA	UGA	KEN	LSU	MSU	MIZZ	MISS	SCAR	TENN	TAMU	VAN	Team	Div	SR	SW

Updated for entire regular season.

== Rankings ==
Ranking movements Legend: ██ Increase in ranking ██ Decrease in ranking
	Week																			
Poll	Pre	1	2	3	4	5	6	7	8	9	10	11	12	13	14	15	16	17	18	Final
Coaches'	4	4*		3	3	2	1	5	3	3	2	2	2	2						
Baseball America	3	3	2	2	2	2	1	3	4	3	2	2	2	2	1					
Collegiate Baseball^	5	5	3	3	3	4	3	7	8	5	5	5	5	3	5	1				
NCBWA†	4	4	4	3	3	2	1	5	3	3	2	2	2	2	2					

^ Collegiate Baseball ranked 40 teams in their preseason poll, but only ranked 30 teams weekly during the season.
† NCBWA ranks 30 teams in their preseason poll, but only ranks 25 teams weekly during the season.
* A new poll was not released for this week, so for comparison purposes, the previous week's ranking is inserted in this week's slot.
