= 2016 Southeastern Conference baseball tournament =

- Teams: 12
- Format: See below
- Finals site: Hoover Metropolitan Stadium; Hoover, AL
- Champions: Texas A&M (1st title)
- Winning coach: Rob Childress (1st title)
- MVP: Nick Banks (Texas A&M)
- Attendance: 150,064 (record)
- Television: ESPN2 (championship game)

2016 Southeastern Conference baseball standings
| | Conf. | | | | | | Overall |
| Team | W | | L | | T | PCT | W | | L | | T | PCT |
|---|---|---|---|---|---|---|---|---|---|---|---|---|
Eastern
| No. 12 South Carolina ^{x}‍‍‍^{y} | 20 | – | 9 | – | 0 | .690 | 46 | – | 18 | – | 0 | .719 |
| No. 7 Florida ‍‍‍^{y} | 19 | – | 10 | – | 0 | .655 | 52 | – | 16 | – | 0 | .765 |
| No. 23 Vanderbilt ‍‍‍^{y} | 18 | – | 12 | – | 0 | .600 | 43 | – | 19 | – | 0 | .694 |
| Kentucky ‍‍‍ | 15 | – | 15 | – | 0 | .500 | 32 | – | 25 | – | 0 | .561 |
| Georgia ‍‍‍ | 11 | – | 19 | – | 0 | .367 | 27 | – | 30 | – | 0 | .474 |
| Tennessee ‍‍‍ | 9 | – | 21 | – | 0 | .300 | 29 | – | 28 | – | 0 | .509 |
| Missouri ‍‍‍ | 9 | – | 21 | – | 0 | .300 | 26 | – | 30 | – | 0 | .464 |
Western
| No. 10 Mississippi State ^{x}‍†‍‍^{y} | 21 | – | 9 | – | 0 | .700 | 44 | – | 18 | – | 1 | .706 |
| No. 9 Texas A&M ‍‍‡‍^{y} | 20 | – | 10 | – | 0 | .667 | 49 | – | 16 | – | 0 | .754 |
| No. 13 LSU ‍‍‍^{y} | 19 | – | 11 | – | 0 | .633 | 45 | – | 21 | – | 0 | .682 |
| Ole Miss ‍‍‍^{y} | 18 | – | 12 | – | 0 | .600 | 43 | – | 19 | – | 0 | .694 |
| Alabama ‍‍‍ | 15 | – | 15 | – | 0 | .500 | 32 | – | 26 | – | 0 | .552 |
| Auburn ‍‍‍ | 8 | – | 22 | – | 0 | .267 | 23 | – | 33 | – | 0 | .411 |
| Arkansas ‍‍‍ | 7 | – | 23 | – | 0 | .233 | 26 | – | 29 | – | 0 | .473 |
x – Division champion † – Conference champion ‡ – Tournament champion y – Invited to the NCAA tournament Rankings from Collegiate Baseball

The 2016 Southeastern Conference baseball tournament was held from May 24 through 29 at Hoover Metropolitan Stadium in Hoover, Alabama. The annual tournament determined the tournament champion of the Division I Southeastern Conference in college baseball. The tournament champion earns the conference's automatic bid to the 2016 NCAA Division I baseball tournament

The tournament has been held every year since 1977, with LSU claiming eleven championships, the most of any school. Original members Georgia and Kentucky along with 1993 addition Arkansas have never won the tournament. This is the nineteenth consecutive year and twenty-first overall that the event has been held at Hoover Metropolitan Stadium, known from 2007 through 2012 as Regions Park.

== Format and seeding ==
The regular season division winners claimed the top two seeds and the next ten teams by conference winning percentage, regardless of division, claimed the remaining berths in the tournament. The bottom eight teams play a single-elimination opening round, followed by a double-elimination format until the semifinals, when the format reverts to single elimination through the championship game. This is the fourth year of this format.

| Team | W–L | Pct | GB #1 | Seed |
|---|---|---|---|---|
Eastern Division
| South Carolina | 20–9 | .690 | 0.5 | 2 |
| Florida | 19–10 | .655 | 1.5 | 4 |
| Vanderbilt | 18–12 | .600 | 3 | 6 |
| Kentucky | 15–15 | .500 | 6 | 8 |
| Georgia | 11–19 | .367 | 10 | 10 |
| Missouri | 9–21 | .300 | 12 | 11 |
| Tennessee | 9–21 | .300 | 12 | 12 |

| Team | W–L | Pct | GB #1 | Seed |
|---|---|---|---|---|
Western Division
| Mississippi State | 21–9 | .700 | – | 1 |
| Texas A&M | 20–10 | .667 | 1 | 3 |
| LSU | 19–11 | .633 | 2 | 5 |
| Ole Miss | 18–12 | .600 | 3 | 7 |
| Alabama | 15–15 | .500 | 6 | 9 |
| Auburn | 8–22 | .267 | 13 | – |
| Arkansas | 7–23 | .233 | 14 | – |

== Bracket ==
First round SECN
6 | Vanderbilt | 7
11 | Missouri | 0
7 | Ole Miss | 5
10 | Georgia | 1
8 | Kentucky | 2
9 | Alabama | 5
5 | LSU | 5
12 | Tennessee | 4

Second round SECN
3 | Texas A&M | 5
6 | Vanderbilt | 6
2 | South Carolina | 4
7 | Ole Miss | 10
3 | Texas A&M | 4
2 | South Carolina | 1
1 | Mississippi State | 4
9 | Alabama | 1
4 | Florida | 3
5 | LSU | 5
9 | Alabama | 4
4 | Florida | 5

Third round SECN
6 | Vanderbilt | 9
7 | Ole Miss | 12
3 | Texas A&M | 13
6 | Vanderbilt | 3^{7}
1 | Mississippi State | 2
5 | LSU | 6
4 | Florida | 12
1 | Mississippi State | 2^{7}

Semifinals; SECN
7 | Ole Miss | 8
3 | Texas A&M | 12
5 | LSU | 0
4 | Florida | 1

Final; ESPN2
3 | Texas A&M | 12
4 | Florida | 5

== Schedule ==
| Game | Time* | Matchup^{#} | Television | Attendance |
Tuesday, May 24
| 1 | 9:30 a.m. | #6 Vanderbilt vs. #11 Missouri | SEC Network | 4,612 |
| 2 | TBD | #7 Ole Miss vs. #10 Georgia | SEC Network | 4,612 |
| 3 | 4:30 p.m. | #8 Kentucky vs. #9 Alabama | SEC Network | 7,287 |
| 4 | TBD | #5 LSU vs. #12 Tennessee | SEC Network | 7,287 |
Wednesday, May 25
| 5 | 9:30 a.m. | #3 Texas A&M vs. #6 Vanderbilt | SEC Network | 5,637 |
| 6 | TBD | #2 South Carolina vs. #7 Ole Miss | SEC Network | 5,637 |
| 7 | 4:30 p.m. | #1 Mississippi State vs. #9 Alabama | SEC Network | 13,448 |
| 8 | TBD | #4 Florida vs. #5 LSU | SEC Network | 13,448 |
Thursday, May 26
| 9 | 9:30 a.m. | #3 Texas A&M vs. #2 South Carolina | SEC Network | 5,232 |
| 10 | TBD | #9 Alabama vs. #4 Florida | SEC Network | 5,232 |
| 11 | 4:30 p.m. | #6 Vanderbilt vs. #7 Ole Miss | SEC Network | 11,390 |
| 12 | TBD | #1 Mississippi State vs. #5 LSU | SEC Network | 11,390 |
Friday, May 27
| 13 | 3 p.m. | #3 Texas A&M vs. #6 Vanderbilt | SEC Network | 9,429 |
| 14 | TBD | #4 Florida vs. #1 Mississippi State | SEC Network | 9,429 |
Semifinals – Saturday, May 28
| 15 | Noon | #3 Texas A&M vs. #7 Ole Miss | SEC Network | 13,821 |
| 16 | TBD | #4 Florida vs. #5 LSU | SEC Network | 13,821 |
Championship – Sunday, May 29
| 17 | 2:00 p.m. | #3 Texas A&M vs. #4 Florida | ESPN2 | 8,352 |
*Game times in CDT. # – Rankings denote tournament seed.

== All-Tournament Team ==
The following players were named to the All-Tournament Team.

| Pos. | Player | School |
|---|---|---|
| P | Scott Moss | Florida |
| P | Brigham Hill | Texas A&M |
| P | Zac Houston | Mississippi State |
| C | Henri Lartigue | Ole Miss |
| DH | Jonathan Moroney | Texas A&M |
| 1B | J. J. Schwarz | Florida |
| 2B | Ryne Birk | Texas A&M |
| 3B | Colby Bortles | Ole Miss |
| SS | Austin Homan | Texas A&M |
| OF | Nick Banks | Texas A&M |
| OF | J. B. Woodman | Ole Miss |
| OF | Bryan Reynolds | Vanderbilt |

Bold is MVP.
