= 2016 Vanderbilt Commodores baseball team =

American college baseball season

2016 Vanderbilt Commodores baseball
- Conference: Southeastern Conference

Ranking
- Coaches: No. 10
- Record: 42–19 (18–12 SEC)
- Head coach: Tim Corbin (14th season)
- Assistant coaches: Scott Brown (4th season); Travis Jewett (4th season)
- Home stadium: Hawkins Field

2016 Southeastern Conference baseball standings
	Conf.						Overall
Team	W		L		T	PCT	W		L		T	PCT
Eastern
No. 12 South Carolina ^{x}‍‍‍^{y}	20	–	9	–	0	.690	46	–	18	–	0	.719
No. 7 Florida ‍‍‍^{y}	19	–	10	–	0	.655	52	–	16	–	0	.765
No. 23 Vanderbilt ‍‍‍^{y}	18	–	12	–	0	.600	43	–	19	–	0	.694
Kentucky ‍‍‍	15	–	15	–	0	.500	32	–	25	–	0	.561
Georgia ‍‍‍	11	–	19	–	0	.367	27	–	30	–	0	.474
Tennessee ‍‍‍	9	–	21	–	0	.300	29	–	28	–	0	.509
Missouri ‍‍‍	9	–	21	–	0	.300	26	–	30	–	0	.464
Western
No. 10 Mississippi State ^{x}‍†‍‍^{y}	21	–	9	–	0	.700	44	–	18	–	1	.706
No. 9 Texas A&M ‍‍‡‍^{y}	20	–	10	–	0	.667	49	–	16	–	0	.754
No. 13 LSU ‍‍‍^{y}	19	–	11	–	0	.633	45	–	21	–	0	.682
Ole Miss ‍‍‍^{y}	18	–	12	–	0	.600	43	–	19	–	0	.694
Alabama ‍‍‍	15	–	15	–	0	.500	32	–	26	–	0	.552
Auburn ‍‍‍	8	–	22	–	0	.267	23	–	33	–	0	.411
Arkansas ‍‍‍	7	–	23	–	0	.233	26	–	29	–	0	.473
x – Division champion † – Conference champion ‡ – Tournament champion y – Invited to the NCAA tournament Rankings from Collegiate Baseball

The 2016 Vanderbilt Commodores baseball team represented Vanderbilt University during the 2016 NCAA Division I baseball season. The Commodores play their home games at Hawkins Field as a member of the Eastern Division of the Southeastern Conference. They are led by head coach Tim Corbin, in his 14th season at Vanderbilt. The Commodores compiled a 40–15 regular season record, going 18–12 in the SEC and finishing ranked #10 in the nation. The Commodores earned a #6 seed in the 2016 Southeastern Conference tournament, where they went 2–2 and were eliminated by Texas A&M, the eventual champions. Following the SEC tournament, the Commodores hosted a regional in the NCAA Division I baseball tournament, part of the Louisville super regional. The season was marred by the death of freshman pitcher Donny Everett, who drowned the day before Vanderbilt was to take on Xavier University in their first regional game. Vanderbilt went 0–2 in the Nashville regional to end the season, falling to Xavier and Washington.

== Previous season ==
After a slow start to the 2015 season, the Commodores easily qualified for the 2015 Southeastern Conference tournament, where they finished second to the Florida Gators. They then played host to the 2015 NCAA Nashville Regional, where they defeated Lipscomb University and Radford University, the latter by a record-tying shutout score of 21–0. The Commodores then faced the University of Illinois in the NCAA Superegional, defeating them in a two-game sweep and advancing to the College World Series. In their opening-round game in the 2015 College World Series, Vanderbilt defeated Cal State Fullerton, 4–3, on a walk-off home run in the bottom of the ninth in a game that had been suspended due to rain the night before, advancing into the winners' bracket. In their second-round game, Vanderbilt defeated the number 7 national seed TCU, 1–0. Zander Wiel hit a home run in the 7th inning to score the lone run of the game and break up a no-hitter. Behind an offensive outburst and dominating performance behind the arm of Walker Buehler, the Commodores beat TCU 7–1 to advance to their second straight College World Series Championship Series. In game 1 of the championship series Vanderbilt defeated Virginia 5–1 thanks to an outing by Carson Fulmer. Virginia held Vanderbilt scoreless (3–0) for just the second time all year, forcing a winner-take-all third game for the national championship. The Cavaliers beat Vanderbilt 4–2 to win their first baseball national championship in program history.

== Donny Everett ==
Vanderbilt freshman pitcher Donny Everett drowned at Normandy Lake, in Manchester, Tennessee, on June 2, 2016, just one day before the Commodores were to play Xavier to enter the NCAA Division I baseball tournament. According to officials, Everett was fishing with four friends when he decided to attempt to swim from the west side to the east side of Fire Lake Bridge. Halfway through, Everett began noticing problems and notified his friends for help, but they thought he was "joking around" because he didn't seem to be in distress. The report stated one of the four swam in to help Everett, by which he stated he wasn't a good swimmer and struggling to stay afloat. He looked back, but Everett had gone under and wasn't coming up-shore. Officials sent a deputy and an ambulance at 5:00 PM to the lake for "a subject that had gone underwater". Deputies recovered his body at 6:49 PM, and he was sent to the state medical examiner in Nashville. He was 19 years old. Everett won the 2015 Gatorade Player of the Year, and was drafted in the 29th round last year by the Milwaukee Brewers out of Clarksville High School in Clarksville, Tennessee. He finished this season with a 0–1 record and a 1.50 ERA, as well as 13 strikeouts in 12 innings. After Everett's death, Vanderbilt University released a statement saying that "...the team, the athletic department and the university are trying to come to terms with this tragedy." As a result of Everett's untimely death, many NCAA baseball teams, including Ole Miss and LSU, paid tribute by holding a moment of silence and writing Everett's initials on their equipment. The NCAA offered to postpone Vanderbilt's June 3 game against Xavier but the Commodores planned to play, with Coach Corbin calling the baseball field "their safe haven." The game was eventually postponed due to rain.

== Personnel ==
=== Roster ===
2016 Vanderbilt Commodores roster
Pitchers: 21 – John Kilichowski – Junior; 23 – Joey Abraham – Sophomore; 24 – Jordan Sheffield – (redshirt) Sophomore; 27 – Chandler Day – Freshman; 28 – Matt Ruppenthal – Sophomore; 29 – Patrick Raby – Freshman; 31 – Ryan Johnson – (redshirt) Sophomore; 32 – Hayden Stone – Junior; 35 – Ben Bowden – Junior; 38 – Matt McGarry – Freshman; 40 – Collin Snider – Sophomore; 41 – Donny Everett – Freshman; 42 – Maddux Conger – Freshman; 44 – Kyle Wright – Sophomore; 45 – Evan Steele – Freshman	Catchers: 5 – Jason Delay – Junior; 25 – Karl Ellison – Junior; 33 – Tristan Chari – Sophomore; Infielders: 2 – Tyler Campbell – Senior; 8 – Alonzo Jones – Freshman; 9 – Will Toffey – Sophomore; 10 – Ethan Paul – Freshman; 11 – Liam Sabino – Sophomore; 12 – Connor Kaiser – Freshman; 16 – Penn Murfee – (redshirt) Sophomore; 55 – Tyler Green – (redshirt) Sophomore	Outfielders: 1 – Ro Coleman – Junior; 3 – Jeren Kendall – Sophomore; 17 – Walker Grisanti – Freshman; 18 – Nolan Rogers – Junior; 19 – Stephen Scott – Freshman; 20 – Bryan Reynolds – Junior; 39 – Kyle Smith – Senior

=== Coaching staff ===
Name	Position	Seasons at Vanderbilt	Alma mater
Tim Corbin	Head coach	14	Ohio Wesleyan University (1984)
Scott Brown	Assistant coach	4	SUNY Cortland (1999)
Travis Jewett	Assistant coach	4	Washington State University (1993)

== Schedule ==
Legend
	Vanderbilt win
	Vanderbilt loss
	Postponement
**Bold**	Vanderbilt team member

2015 Vanderbilt Commodores Game Log
Regular season

February
Date	Opponent	Rank	Site/stadium	Score	Win	Loss	Save	Attendance	Overall record	SEC record
February 19	vs. San Diego	#3	Hawkins Field • Nashville, TN	8–4	**Sheffield** (1–0)	Conyers (0–1)	**Ruppenthal** (1)	3,054	1–0	
February 20	vs. San Diego	#3	Hawkins Field • Nashville, TN	13–6	**Snider** (1–0)	Jacobs (0–1)	None	3,168	2–0	
February 21	vs. San Diego	#3	Hawkins Field • Nashville, TN	17–1	**Johnson** (1–0)	Sprengel (0–1)	None	2,743	3–0	
February 23	vs. Tennessee-Martin	#3	Hawkins Field • Nashville, TN	11–6 (5)	**Day** (1–0)	Patzner (0–1)	None	2,426	4–0	
February 24	vs. Eastern Illinois	#3	Hawkins Field • Nashville, TN	9–1	**Raby** (1–0)	Hughes (0–1)	None	2,401	5–0	
February 26	vs. UIC	#3	Hawkins Field • Nashville, TN	9–0	**Sheffield** (2–0)	Dahlberg (0–2)	None	2,473	6–0	
February 27	vs. UIC	#3	Hawkins Field • Nashville, TN	6–5 (14)	**Johnson** (2–0)	Lane (1–1)	None	2841	7–0	
February 28	vs. UIC	#3	Hawkins Field • Nashville, TN	20–8	**Wright** (1–0)	Schulewitz (1–1)	None	3,028	8–0	

March
Date	Opponent	Rank	Site/stadium	Score	Win	Loss	Save	Attendance	Overall record	SEC record
March 1	Tennessee Tech	#2	Hawkins Field • Nashville, TN	Cancelled						
March 3	at Stanford	#2	Klein Field at Sunken Diamond • Palo Alto, CA	1–4	Beck (2–1)	**Sheffield** (2–1)	Hock (2)		8–1	
March 3	at Stanford	#2	Klein Field at Sunken Diamond • Palo Alto, CA	4–1	**Bowden** (1–0)	Bubic (0–1)	**Stone** (1)		9–1	
March 5	at Stanford	#2	Klein Field at Sunken Diamond • Palo Alto, CA	Moved to March 3						
March 6	at Stanford	#2	Klein Field at Sunken Diamond • Palo Alto, CA	5–2	**Wright** (2–0)	Hanewich (2–1)	**Stone** (2)	1,816	10–1	
March 8	vs. Radford	#2	Hawkins Field • Nashville, TN	13–4	**Raby** (2–0)	Swarmer (0–1)	None	2,539	11–1	
March 9	vs. Radford	#2	Hawkins Field • Nashville, TN	12–0	**Day** (2–0)	Ross (0–3)	**Abraham** (1)	2,487	12–1	
March 11	vs. Xavier	#2	Hawkins Field • Nashville, TN	7–0	**Sheffield** (3–1)	Lowther (1–2)	None	2,526	13–1	
March 12	vs. Xavier	#2	Hawkins Field • Nashville, TN	14–3	**Bowden** (2–0)	Jacknewitz (0–3)	None	2,831	14–1	
March 13	vs. Xavier	#2	Hawkins Field • Nashville, TN	5–2	**Wright** (3–0)	Astle (0–2)	**Stone** (3)	2,667	15–1	
March 15	vs. Northern Illinois	#2	Hawkins Field • Nashville, TN	9–2	**Raby** (3–0)	Ceja (0–1)	None	2,628	16–1	
March 18	vs. #15 Mississippi State	#2	Hawkins Field • Nashville, TN	1–2 (13)	Rigby (1–0)	**Ruppenthal** (0–1)	None	3,626	16–2	0–1
March 19	vs. #15 Mississippi State	#2	Hawkins Field • Nashville, TN	4–5	Breaux (1–1)	**Stone** (0–1)	Hughes (1)	3,626	16–3	0–2
March 20	vs. #15 Mississippi State	#2	Hawkins Field • Nashville, TN	12–6	**Wright** (4–0)	Brown (2–1)	**Raby** (1)	3,330	17–3	1–2
March 22	at Middle Tennessee	#5	Reese Smith Jr. Field • Murfreesboro, TN	4–7	Spencer (3–0)	**Day** (2–1)	Puckett (3)	2,523	17–4	1–2
March 25	at Missouri	#5	Taylor Stadium • Columbia, MO	8–6	**Steele** (1–0)	Carter (0–1)	**Bowden** (1)	2,398	18–4	2–2
March 26	at Missouri	#5	Taylor Stadium • Columbia, MO	2–0 (11)	**Ruppenthal** (1–4)	Bartlett (1–2)	**Bowden** (2)	1,262	19–4	3–2
March 27	at Missouri	#5	Taylor Stadium • Columbia, MO	17–7	**Johnson** (3–0)	Tribby (2–3)	None	263	20–4	4–2
March 29	vs. Belmont	#3	First Tennessee Park • Nashville, TN	8–2	**Snider** (2–0)	Klotz (2–2)	None	3,782	21–4	4–2
March 31	vs. #5 South Carolina	#3	Hawkins Field • Nashville, TN	6–3	**Sheffield** (4–1)	Schmidt (6–1)	**Bowden** (3)	3,384	22–4	5–2

April
Date	Opponent	Rank	Site/stadium	Score	Win	Loss	Save	Attendance	Overall record	SEC record
April 1	vs. #5 South Carolina	#3	Hawkins Field • Nashville, TN	0–4	Webb (6–1)	**Wright** (4–1)	None	3,626	22–5	5–3
April 2	vs. #5 South Carolina	#3	Hawkins Field • Nashville, TN	10–6	**Ruppenthal** (2–1)	Johnson (0–1)	**Bowden** (4)	3,626	23–5	6–3
April 5	vs. Lipscomb	#2	Hawkins Field • Nashville, TN	4–3	**Raby** (4–0)	Stewart (2–1)	**Bowden** (5)	2,745	24–5	6–3
April 7	at #15 LSU	#2	Alex Box Stadium/Skip Bertman Field • Baton Rouge, LA	4–13	Poche' (4–3)	**Sheffield** (4–2)	None	10,366	24–6	6–4
April 8	at #15 LSU	#2	Alex Box Stadium/Skip Bertman Field • Baton Rouge, LA	2–3	Lange (3–2)	**Wright** (4–2)	Newman (1)	11,146	24–7	6–5
April 9	at #15 LSU	#2	Alex Box Stadium/Skip Bertman Field • Baton Rouge, LA	9–7	**Raby** (5–0)	Gilbert (3–2)	**Bowden** (6)	10,802	25–7	7–5
April 12	vs. Middle Tennessee	#5	Hawkins Field • Nashville, TN	7–4	**Johnson** (4–0)	Wright (0–1)	**Kilichowski** (1)	2,960	26–7	7–5
April 15	vs. #18 Kentucky	#5	Hawkins Field • Nashville, TN	3–0	**Sheffield** (5–2)	Brown (2–6)	None	3,388	27–7	8–5
April 16	vs. #18 Kentucky	#5	Hawkins Field • Nashville, TN	3–2	**Ruppenthal** (3–1)	Strecker (2–1)	**Bowden** (7)	3,626	28–7	9–5
April 17	vs. #18 Kentucky	#5	Hawkins Field • Nashville, TN	0–3	Cody (4–2)	**Kilichowski** (0–1)	Hjelle (6)	3,626	28–8	9–6
April 19	vs. Central Arkansas	#4	Hawkins Field • Nashville, TN	8–6	**Snider** (3–0)	Beier (3–1)	**Bowden** (8)	2,776	29–8	9–6
April 22	at Tennessee	#4	Lindsey Nelson Stadium • Knoxville, TN	6–0	**Sheffield** (6–2)	Soto (4–2)	None	2,084	30–8	10–6
April 23	at Tennessee	#4	Lindsey Nelson Stadium • Knoxville, TN	1–2	Warren (5–4)	**Wright** (4–3)	Cox (1)	2,620	30–9	10–7
April 24	at Tennessee	#4	Lindsey Nelson Stadium • Knoxville, TN	3–5	Neely (1–0)	**Bowden** (2–1)	Cox (2)	3,136	30–10	10–8
April 29	vs. Georgia	#8	Hawkins Field • Nashville, TN	15–3	**Sheffield** (7–2)	Tyler (3–4)	None	3,450	31–10	11–8
April 30	vs. Georgia	#8	Hawkins Field • Nashville, TN	10–3	**Wright** (5–3)	Jones (5–4)	None	3,470	32–10	12–8

May
Date	Opponent	Rank	Site/stadium	Score	Win	Loss	Save	Attendance	Overall record	SEC record
May 1	vs. Georgia	#8	Hawkins Field • Nashville, TN	10–3	**Raby** (6–0)	Holder (2–3)	**Kilichowski** (2)	3,608	33–10	13–8
May 3	vs. Western Kentucky	#8	Hawkins Field • Nashville, TN	6–1	**McGarry** (1–0)	Coll (3–3)	None	2,669	34–10	13–8
May 5	at #2 Texas A&M	#8	Olsen Field at Blue Bell Park • College Station, TX	0–1	Vinson (2–2)	**Sheffield** (7–3)	Ecker (3)	4,482	34–11	13–9
May 6	at #2 Texas A&M	#8	Olsen Field at Blue Bell Park • College Station, TX	6–1	**Wright** (6–3)	Hill (5–1)	None	6,054	35–11	14–9
May 7	at #2 Texas A&M	#8	Olsen Field at Blue Bell Park • College Station, TX	0–3	Simonds (8–1)	**Raby** (6–1)	None	6,550	35–12	14–10
May 10	vs. #6 Louisville	#11	Hawkins Field • Nashville, TN	5–8	McClure (10–0)	**Everett** (0–1)	Burdi (7)	3,206	35–13	14–10
May 13	at #1 Florida	#11	Alfred A. McKethan Stadium • Gainesville, FL	2–4	Shore (10–0)	**Sheffield** (7–4)	None	4,537	35–14	14–11
May 14	at #1 Florida	#11	Alfred A. McKethan Stadium • Gainesville, FL	5–0	**Wright** (7–3)	Puk (2–3)	None	4,783	36–14	15–11
May 15	at #1 Florida	#11	Alfred A. McKethan Stadium • Gainesville, FL	6–10	Faedo (10–1)	**Kilichowski** (0–2)	None	4,340	36–15	15–12
May 17	vs. Morehead State	#12	Hawkins Field • Nashville, TN	6–0	**Snider** (4–0)	Pearcy (0–3)	None	2,632	37–15	15–12
May 19	vs. Auburn	#12	Hawkins Field • Nashville, TN	5–2	**Sheffield** (8–4)	Camp (3–5)	**Raby** (2)	2,896	38–15	16–12
May 20	vs. Auburn	#12	Hawkins Field • Nashville, TN	9–3	**Kilichowski** (1–2)	Lipscomb (1–4)	None	3,450	39–15	17–12
May 21	vs. Auburn	#12	Hawkins Field • Nashville, TN	4–3	**Wright** (8–3)	Mize (2–5)	**Bowden** (10)	3,626	40–15	18–12

Postseason

SEC Tournament
Date	Opponent	SECT Rank	Site/stadium	Score	Win	Loss	Save	Attendance	Overall record	SECT Record
May 24	vs. #11 Missouri	#6	Hoover Met • Hoover, AL	7–0	**Raby** (7–1)	Houck (5–6)	**Snider** (3)		41–15	1–0
May 25	vs. #3 Texas A&M	#6	Hoover Met • Hoover, AL	6–5	**Ruppenthal** (5–1)	Ecker (4–2)	None		42–15	2–0
May 26	vs. #7 Ole Miss	#6	Hoover Met • Hoover, AL	9–12	McArthur (6–1)	**Sheffield** (8–5)	None		42–16	2–1
May 26	vs. #3 Texas A&M	#6	Hoover Met • Hoover, AL	3–13	Simonds (9–3)	**Wright** (8–4)	None		42–17	2–2 Eliminated

NCAA tournament: Nashville Regional
Date	Opponent	Regional Rank	Site/stadium	Score	Win	Loss	Save	Attendance	Overall record	Regional Record
June 3	vs. #4 Xavier	#1	Hawkins Field • Nashville, TN	Moved to June 4						
June 4	vs. #4 Xavier	#1	Hawkins Field • Nashville, TN	1–15	Lowther (7–5)	**Sheffield** (8–6)	None	2,954	42–18	0–1
June 4	vs. #3 Washington	#1	Hawkins Field • Nashville, TN	8–9	Jones (6–2)	**Ruppenthal** (5–2)	None		42–19	0–2 Eliminated

== Record vs. conference opponents ==
Last two do not qualify for conf. tourn. Blank are not scheduled. Blue are home games, otherwise away.

2016 SEC baseball records Source: 2016 SEC baseball game results
Team	W–L	ALA	ARK	AUB	FLA	UGA	KEN	LSU	MSU	MIZZ	MISS	SCAR	TENN	TAMU	VAN	Team	Div	SR	SW
ALA	15–15		3–0	2–1	.	1–2	1–2	2–1	1–2	.	2–1	0–3	2–1	1–2	.	ALA	W5	5–5	1–1
ARK	7–23	0–3		3–0	0–3	.	2–1	0–3	0–3	1–2	0–3	0–3	.	1–2	.	ARK	W7	2–8	1–6
AUB	8–22	1–2	0–3		.	.	2–1	1–2	0–3	1–2	0–3	.	2–1	1–2	0–3	AUB	W6	2–8	0–4
FLA	19–10	.	3–0	.		2–1	1–2	1–2	1–2	3–0	.	1–1	2–1	3–0	2–1	FLA	E2	6–3	3–0
UGA	11–19	2–1	.	.	1–2		1–2	.	1–2	2–1	1–2	2–1	1–2	0–3	0–3	UGA	E5	3–7	0–2
KEN	15–15	2–1	1–2	1–2	2–1	2–1		.	.	2–1	0–3	2–1	2–1	.	1–2	KEN	E4	6–4	0–1
LSU	19–11	1–2	3–0	2–1	2–1	.	.		1–2	3–0	1–2	.	3–0	1–2	2–1	LSU	W3	6–4	3–0
MSU	21–9	2–1	3–0	3–0	2–1	2–1	.	2–1		3–0	2–1	.	.	0–3	2–1	MSU	W1	9–1	3–1
MIZZ	9–21	.	2–1	2–1	0–3	1–2	1–2	0–3	0–3		.	0–3	3–0	.	0–3	MIZZ	E7	2–8	1–4
MISS	18–12	1–2	3–0	3–0	.	2–1	3–0	2–1	1–2	.		0–3	2–1	1–2	.	MISS	W4	6–4	3–1
SCAR	20–9	3–0	3–0	.	1–1	1–2	1–2	.	.	3–0	3–0		3–0	1–2	1–2	SCAR	E1	5–4	5–0
TENN	9–21	1–2	.	1–2	1–2	2–1	1–2	0–3	.	0–3	1–2	0–3		.	2–1	TENN	E6	2–8	0–3
TAMU	20–10	2–1	2–1	2–1	0–3	3–0	.	2–1	3–0	.	2–1	2–1	.		2–1	TAMU	W2	9–1	2–1
VAN	18–12	.	.	3–0	1–2	3–0	2–1	1–2	1–2	3–0	.	2–1	1–2	1–2		VAN	E3	5–5	3–0
Team	W–L	ALA	ARK	AUB	FLA	UGA	KEN	LSU	MSU	MIZZ	MISS	SCAR	TENN	TAMU	VAN	Team	Div	SR	SW

Updated for entire regular season.
