= 2016 Alabama Crimson Tide baseball team =

American college baseball season

2016 Alabama Crimson Tide baseball
- Conference: Southeastern Conference
- West
- Record: 32–26 (15-15 SEC)
- Head coach: Mitch Gaspard (7th season)
- Hitting coach: Andy Phillips
- Pitching coach: Dax Norris
- Home stadium: Sewell–Thomas Stadium

2016 Southeastern Conference baseball standings
	Conf.						Overall
Team	W		L		T	PCT	W		L		T	PCT
Eastern
No. 12 South Carolina ^{x}‍‍‍^{y}	20	–	9	–	0	.690	46	–	18	–	0	.719
No. 7 Florida ‍‍‍^{y}	19	–	10	–	0	.655	52	–	16	–	0	.765
No. 23 Vanderbilt ‍‍‍^{y}	18	–	12	–	0	.600	43	–	19	–	0	.694
Kentucky ‍‍‍	15	–	15	–	0	.500	32	–	25	–	0	.561
Georgia ‍‍‍	11	–	19	–	0	.367	27	–	30	–	0	.474
Tennessee ‍‍‍	9	–	21	–	0	.300	29	–	28	–	0	.509
Missouri ‍‍‍	9	–	21	–	0	.300	26	–	30	–	0	.464
Western
No. 10 Mississippi State ^{x}‍†‍‍^{y}	21	–	9	–	0	.700	44	–	18	–	1	.706
No. 9 Texas A&M ‍‍‡‍^{y}	20	–	10	–	0	.667	49	–	16	–	0	.754
No. 13 LSU ‍‍‍^{y}	19	–	11	–	0	.633	45	–	21	–	0	.682
Ole Miss ‍‍‍^{y}	18	–	12	–	0	.600	43	–	19	–	0	.694
Alabama ‍‍‍	15	–	15	–	0	.500	32	–	26	–	0	.552
Auburn ‍‍‍	8	–	22	–	0	.267	23	–	33	–	0	.411
Arkansas ‍‍‍	7	–	23	–	0	.233	26	–	29	–	0	.473
x – Division champion † – Conference champion ‡ – Tournament champion y – Invited to the NCAA tournament Rankings from Collegiate Baseball

The 2016 Alabama Crimson Tide baseball team represented the University of Alabama in the 2016 NCAA Division I baseball season. The Crimson Tide played their home games in Sewell–Thomas Stadium.

== Personnel ==
=== Returning starters ===
Player	Class	Position
Will Haynie	Sophomore	C
Chandler Avant	Sophomore	INF
Cody Henry	Sophomore	INF
Chance Vincent	Junior	INF
Georgie Salem	Junior	CF
Geoffrey Bramblett	Junior	SP
Jake Walters	Sophomore	SP

=== Roster ===
2016 Alabama Crimson Tide roster
Pitchers: 15 Geoffrey Bramblett - Junior; 16 Jake Walters- Sophomore; 20 Brock Love - Freshman; 23 Ray Castillo - Senior; 26 Dylan Duarte - Freshman; 27 Zac Rogers - Sophomore; 28 Jake Hubbard - Senior; 29 Nick Eicholtz - Junior; 32 Matt Foster - Junior; 33 Kyle Cameron - Freshman; 35 Jon Keller - Senior; 36 Tyler McMurray- Sophomore; 39 Austin Coates - Freshman; 40 Thomas Burrows - Junior; 42 Tyler Adams - Sophomore; 44 Davis Vainer - Freshman; 45 Will Foy - Freshman; 55 Mike Oczypok - (redshirt) Junior	Catchers: 13 Tanner DeVinny - Junior; 24 Will Haynie - Junior; 38 Griffin Tolle - Freshman; 41 Taylor Poe - Junior; Infielders: 1 Cobie Vance - Freshman; 3 Daniel Cucjen - Senior; 5 Chandler Avant - Sophomore; 9 Cody Henry - Sophomore; 11 Connor Short - Sophomore; 12 Chance Vincent - Senior; 37 Zack Coker - (redshirt) Freshman	Outfielders: 7 Chandler Taylor - Freshman; 14 Gene Wood - Freshman; 18 Keith Holcombe - Freshman; 19 Hunter Webb - Junior; 22 Georgie Salem - Senior; 25 Ryan Blanchard - Senior; 48 Connor Wright - Freshman; Utility: 6 Alex Webb - Freshman; 10 Sam Finnerty - Freshman; 21 Colton Freeman - Junior

=== Coaching staff ===
2016 Alabama Crimson Tide baseball coaching staff
- Mitch Gaspard – Head Coach - 16 years at Alabama (7th as Head Coach)
- Andy Phillips – Assistant Coach, Hitting Coach - 6th year
- Dax Norris – Assistant Coach, Pitching Coach, Recruiting Coordinator - 9th year
- Nathan Kilcrease – Volunteer Coach - 2nd year
- David Kindred – Director of Baseball Operations - 2nd year

== Schedule and results ==
2016 Alabama Crimson Tide baseball game log
Regular season
February (6–1)

Date	Opponent	Rank	Site/stadium	Score	Win	Loss	Save	TV	Attend.	Overall Rec.	SEC Rec.
Feb. 19	#28 Maryland		Sewell–Thomas Stadium	3–1	**J. Keller (1–0)**	M. Shawaryn (0–1)	**T. Burrows (1)**	SECN+	5,867	1–0	–
Feb. 20	#28 Maryland		Sewell–Thomas Stadium	5–9	T. Bloom (1–0)	**J. Walters (0–1)**	R. Selmer (1)	SECN+	6,449	1–1	–
Feb. 21	#28 Maryland		Sewell–Thomas Stadium	5–1	**N. Eicholtz (1–0)**	B. Shaffer (0–1)	**T. Burrows (2)**	SECN+	4,119	2–1	–
Feb. 24	Nicholls State	#30	Sewell–Thomas Stadium	13–1	**M. Oczypok (1-0)**	M. Hanchar (0–1)	None	SECN+	3,210	3–1	–
Feb. 26	North Dakota	#30	Sewell–Thomas Stadium	2–1	**M. Foster (1–0)**	Z. Muckenhirn (1–1)	None	SECN+	3,863	4–1	–
Feb. 27	North Dakota	#30	Sewell–Thomas Stadium	5–2	**J. Walters (1–1)**	B. DeGagne (1–1)	**T. Burrows (3)**	SECN+	4,699	5–1	–
Feb. 28	North Dakota	#30	Sewell–Thomas Stadium	6–1	**D. Duarte (1–0)**	M. McNair (0–1)	None	SECN+	4,243	6–1	–

March (10–8)

Date	Opponent	Rank	Site/stadium	Score	Win	Loss	Save	TV	Attend.	Overall Rec.	SEC Rec.
Mar. 1	Troy	#22	Riddle–Pace Field	2–1	**S. Finnerty (1–0)**	M. Skinner (0–1)	**T. Burrows (4)**		3,243	7–1	–
Mar. 4	Notre Dame	#22	USA Baseball Complex	4–0	**G. Bramblett (1–0)**	R. Smoyer (1–2)	None		280	8–1	–
Mar. 5	Niagara	#22	USA Baseball Complex	8–4	**M. Oczypok (2–0)**	D. Procopio (0–2)	None		169	9–1	–
Mar. 5	NC State	#22	USA Baseball Complex	1–2	E. Brabrand (1–0)	**D. Duarte (1–1)**	T. DeJuneas (2)		987	9–2	–
Mar. 6	Brown	#22	USA Baseball Complex	2–0	**K. Cameron (1–0)**	M. Ritchie (0–1)	None		107	10–2	–
Mar. 10	#8 Oregon	#24	Sewell–Thomas Stadium	Canceled							
Mar. 11	Houston	#24	Sewell–Thomas Stadium	1–3	A. Lantrip (2–2)	**M. Foster (1–1)**	N. Hernandez (2)	SECN+	3,100	10–3	–
Mar. 12	Houston	#24	Sewell–Thomas Stadium	2–3	S. Romero (2–0)	**J. Walters (0–2)**	N. Hernandez (3)	SECN+	3,158	10–4	–
Mar. 13	Houston	#24	Sewell–Thomas Stadium	7–6	**D. Duarte (2–1)**	T. Cumbie (0–1)	None	SECN+	3,543	11–4	–
Mar. 15	Sou. Miss		Pete Taylor Park	2–9	N. Johnson (1–0)	**M. Oczypok (2–1)**	None		3,577	11–5	–
Mar. 19	#10 LSU		Alex Box Stadium	6–0	**G. Bramblett (2–0)**	A. Lange (2–1)	**J. Keller (1)**	SECN+	10,366	12–5	1–0
Mar. 19	#10 LSU		Alex Box Stadium	4–3	**J. Walters (2–2)**	J. Poche (2–2)	**M. Foster (1)**	SECN+	10,806	13–5	2–0
Mar. 20	#10 LSU		Alex Box Stadium	5–7	C. Gilbert (2–1)	**K. Cameron (1–1)**	None	SECN+	10,376	13–6	2–1
Mar. 22	UAB	#22	Regions Field	0–8	K. Davis (1–0)	**M. Oczypok (2–2)**	None		3,525	13–7	–
Mar. 25	Tennessee	#22	Sewell–Thomas Stadium	7–3	**G. Bramblett (3–0)**	Z. Warren (4–1)	**D. Duarte (1)**	SECN+	5,867	14–7	3–1
Mar. 26	Tennessee	#22	Sewell–Thomas Stadium	11–3	**K. Cameron (2–1)**	A. Cox (2–2)	None	SECN+	3,842	15–7	4–1
Mar. 26	Tennessee	#22	Sewell–Thomas Stadium	3–6	Z. Reid (1–0)	**M. Foster (1–2)**	D. Vasquez (1)	SECN	4,405	15–8	4–2
Mar. 29	Auburn†	#25	Riverwalk Stadium	1–10	M. Mitchell (4–0)	**J. Keller (1–1)**	G. Cardenas (2)	SECN	7,307	15–9	–
Mar. 31	Georgia	#25	Foley Field	7–1^{13}	**M. Foster (2–2)**	B. Tucker (3–2)	**T. Burrows (5)**	SECN	1,532	16–9	5–2

April (9–11)

Date	Opponent	Rank	Site/stadium	Score	Win	Loss	Save	TV	Attend.	Overall Rec.	SEC Rec.
April 1	Georgia	#25	Foley Field	1–7	R. Tyler (3–1)	**J. Walters (2–3)**	None	SECN+	1,848	16–10	5–3
April 2	Georgia	#25	Foley Field	4–12	C. Jones (4–1)	**N. Eicholtz (1–1)**	None	SECN	3,630	16–11	5–4
April 5	Alcorn State		Sewell–Thomas Stadium	8–5	**M. Foster (3–2)**	P. McMahon (0–1)	**T. Burrows (6)**	SECN+	3,659	17–11	–
April 5	Alcorn State		Sewell–Thomas Stadium	8–0^{7}	**J. Hubbard (1–0)**	R. Johnson (3–3)	None	SECN+	3,659	18–11	–
April 8	#13 Kentucky		Cliff Hagan Stadium	2–3	Z. Brown (2–5)	**G. Bramblett (3–1)**	S. Hjelle (5)	SECN+	1,765	18–12	5–5
April 9	#13 Kentucky		Cliff Hagan Stadium	2–6	S. Hjelle (2–0)	**R. Castillo (0–1)**	None	SECN+	1,918	18–13	5–6
April 10	#13 Kentucky		Cliff Hagan Stadium	2–1	**N. Eicholtz (2–1)**	K. Cody (3–2)	**T. Burrows (7)**	SECN+	2,012	19–13	6–6
April 12	UAB		Sewell–Thomas Stadium	7–6	**M. Foster (4–2)**	T. Lowery (0–3)	**T. Burrows (8)**	SECN+	3,545	20–13	–
April 15	#15 Ole Miss		Sewell–Thomas Stadium	0–4	B. Bramlett (6–2)	**G. Bramblett (3–2)**	W. Short (6)	SECN+	5,950	20–14	6–7
April 16	#15 Ole Miss		Sewell–Thomas Stadium	2–0	**J. Walters (3–3)**	D. Parkinson (1–1)	**T. Burrows (9)**	SECN+	6,385	21–14	7–7
April 17	#15 Ole Miss		Sewell–Thomas Stadium	7–2	**N. Eicholtz (3–1)**	A. Pagnozzi (5–2)	**D. Durante (2)**	SECN+	6,354	22–14	8–7
April 19	Troy		Sewell–Thomas Stadium	5–3	**J. Keller (2–1)**	C. Gill (2–2)	**T. Burrows (10)**	SECN+	3,473	23–14	–
April 20	#23 South Ala.		Sewell–Thomas Stadium	2–8	R. Bell (3–1)	**K. Cameron (2–2)**	None	SECN+	3,565	23–15	–
April 22	#5 Texas A&M		Olsen Field	3–4	M. Ecker (3–2)	**D. Duarte (2–2)**	None	SECN+	5,905	23–16	8–8
April 23	#5 Texas A&M		Olsen Field	7–4	**J. Walters (4–3)**	J. Vines (6–1)	None	SECN+	6,543	24–16	9–8
April 24	#5 Texas A&M		Olsen Field	1–2	A. Vinson (1–1)	**M. Foster (4–3)**	None	SECN+	5,936	24–17	9–9
April 26	Samford		Griffin Stadium	2–3	T. Widra (3–3)	**S. Finnerty (1–1)**	None	SECN+	1,917	24–18	–
April 28	#8 Mississippi St.		Sewell–Thomas Stadium	5–12	D. Hudson (6–3)	**G. Bramblett (3–3)**	B. Smith (2)	ESPNU	4,064	24–19	9–10
April 29	#8 Mississippi St.		Sewell–Thomas Stadium	4–3	**M. Foster (5–3)**	R. Cyr (1–1)	None	SECN+	–	25–19	10–10
April 30	#8 Mississippi St.		Sewell–Thomas Stadium	1–2	K. Pilkington (2–1)	**N. Eicholtz (3–2)**	D. Brown (1)	SECN	6,644	25–20	10–11

May (6–4)

Date	Opponent	Site/stadium	Score	Win	Loss	Save	TV	Attend.	Overall Rec.	SEC Rec.
May 6	Auburn	Sewell–Thomas Stadium	6–2	**G. Bramblett (4–3)**	G. Klobosits (2–5)	**M. Foster (2)**	SECN+	6,196	26–20	11–11
May 7	Auburn	Sewell–Thomas Stadium	4–3^{(11)}	**T. Burrows (1–0)**	C. Mize (2–3)	None	SECN	6,324	27–20	12–11
May 8	Auburn	Sewell–Thomas Stadium	1–8	B. Braymer (4–4)	**N. Eicholtz (3–3)**	None	SECN	5,991	27–21	12–12
May 13	Arkansas	Baum Stadium	8–6	**G. Bramblett (5–3)**	D. Taccolini (5–4)	**T. Burrows (11)**	SECN+	8,329	28–21	13–12
May 14	Arkansas	Baum Stadium	10–4	**J. Walters (5–3)**	K. McKinney (1–5)	None	SECN+	8,547	29–21	14–12
May 15	Arkansas	Baum Stadium	7–4	**T. Burrows (2–0)**	J. Teague (3–4)	None	SECN+	7,128	30–21	15–12
May 17	Samford	Sewell–Thomas Stadium	8–2	**C. Freeman (1–0)**	C. Radcliff (3–4)	**D. Duarte (3)**	SECN+	3,548	31–21	–
May 19	#6 S. Carolina	Sewell–Thomas Stadium	4–6	R. Scott (4–1)	**R. Castillo (0–2)**	T. Johnson (7)	SECN+	3,507	31–22	15–13
May 20	#6 S. Carolina	Sewell–Thomas Stadium	2–4	B. Webb (10–4)	**J. Walters (5–4)**	T. Johnson (8)	SECN+	3,842	31–23	15–14
May 21	#6 S. Carolina	Sewell–Thomas Stadium	7–9	T. Widener (4–2)	**D. Duarte (2–3)**	T. Johnson (9)	SECN+	4,308	31–24	15–15

Postseason
SEC Tournament (1-2)

Date	Opponent	Site/stadium	Score	Win	Loss	Save	Attend.	Overall record	SECT record
May 24	Kentucky	Hoover Met	5–2	**N. Eicholtz (4–3)**	Z. Logue (3–2)	**T. Burrows (12)**	7,287	32–24	1–0
May 25	#1 Mississippi St.	Hoover Met	1–4	Z. Houston (5–0)	**G. Bramblett (5–4)**	B. Smith (4)	13,448	32–25	1–1
May 26	#6 Florida	Hoover Met	4–5	N. Horvath (2–1)	**T. Burrows (2–1)**	S. Anderson (11)	5,232	32–26	1–2

Legend: = Win = Loss = Postponement
Bold = Alabama team member
† Indicates the game does not count toward the 2016 Southeastern Conference standings.
*Rankings are based on the team's current ranking in the Collegiate Baseball poll.

== Record vs. conference opponents ==
Last two do not qualify for conf. tourn. Blank are not scheduled. Blue are home games, otherwise away.

2016 SEC baseball records Source: 2016 SEC baseball game results
Team	W–L	ALA	ARK	AUB	FLA	UGA	KEN	LSU	MSU	MIZZ	MISS	SCAR	TENN	TAMU	VAN	Team	Div	SR	SW
ALA	15–15		3–0	2–1	.	1–2	1–2	2–1	1–2	.	2–1	0–3	2–1	1–2	.	ALA	W5	5–5	1–1
ARK	7–23	0–3		3–0	0–3	.	2–1	0–3	0–3	1–2	0–3	0–3	.	1–2	.	ARK	W7	2–8	1–6
AUB	8–22	1–2	0–3		.	.	2–1	1–2	0–3	1–2	0–3	.	2–1	1–2	0–3	AUB	W6	2–8	0–4
FLA	19–10	.	3–0	.		2–1	1–2	1–2	1–2	3–0	.	1–1	2–1	3–0	2–1	FLA	E2	6–3	3–0
UGA	11–19	2–1	.	.	1–2		1–2	.	1–2	2–1	1–2	2–1	1–2	0–3	0–3	UGA	E5	3–7	0–2
KEN	15–15	2–1	1–2	1–2	2–1	2–1		.	.	2–1	0–3	2–1	2–1	.	1–2	KEN	E4	6–4	0–1
LSU	19–11	1–2	3–0	2–1	2–1	.	.		1–2	3–0	1–2	.	3–0	1–2	2–1	LSU	W3	6–4	3–0
MSU	21–9	2–1	3–0	3–0	2–1	2–1	.	2–1		3–0	2–1	.	.	0–3	2–1	MSU	W1	9–1	3–1
MIZZ	9–21	.	2–1	2–1	0–3	1–2	1–2	0–3	0–3		.	0–3	3–0	.	0–3	MIZZ	E7	2–8	1–4
MISS	18–12	1–2	3–0	3–0	.	2–1	3–0	2–1	1–2	.		0–3	2–1	1–2	.	MISS	W4	6–4	3–1
SCAR	20–9	3–0	3–0	.	1–1	1–2	1–2	.	.	3–0	3–0		3–0	1–2	1–2	SCAR	E1	5–4	5–0
TENN	9–21	1–2	.	1–2	1–2	2–1	1–2	0–3	.	0–3	1–2	0–3		.	2–1	TENN	E6	2–8	0–3
TAMU	20–10	2–1	2–1	2–1	0–3	3–0	.	2–1	3–0	.	2–1	2–1	.		2–1	TAMU	W2	9–1	2–1
VAN	18–12	.	.	3–0	1–2	3–0	2–1	1–2	1–2	3–0	.	2–1	1–2	1–2		VAN	E3	5–5	3–0
Team	W–L	ALA	ARK	AUB	FLA	UGA	KEN	LSU	MSU	MIZZ	MISS	SCAR	TENN	TAMU	VAN	Team	Div	SR	SW

Updated for entire regular season.

== Honors and awards ==
- Chandler Taylor – SEC Freshman of the Week, March 21

== Rankings ==
Ranking movements Legend: ██ Increase in ranking ██ Decrease in ranking — = Not ranked RV = Received votes
	Week																			
Poll	Pre	1	2	3	4	5	6	7	8	9	10	11	12	13	14	15	16	17	18	Final
Coaches'	—	—*		25	RV	RV	RV	RV	RV	RV	—	—	—	—	—					
Baseball America	—	—	—	23	—	22	21	—	—	—	—	—	—	—	—					
Collegiate Baseball^	RV	30	22	24	—	22	25	—	—	—	—	—	—	—	—					
NCBWA†	RV	RV	RV	30	RV	30	RV	RV	RV	RV	—	—	—	—	—					

^ Collegiate Baseball ranked 40 teams in their preseason poll, but only ranked 30 teams weekly during the season.
† NCBWA ranks 30 teams in their preseason poll, but only ranks 25 teams weekly during the season.
* A new poll was not released for this week, so for comparison purposes, the previous week's ranking is inserted in this week's slot.

== See also ==
- 2016 Alabama Crimson Tide softball season
