= 2016 Tennessee Volunteers baseball team =

American college baseball season

2016 Tennessee Volunteers baseball
- Conference: Southeastern Conference
- Record: 29–28 (9–21 SEC)
- Head coach: Dave Serrano (5th season)
- Home stadium: Lindsey Nelson Stadium

2016 Southeastern Conference baseball standings
	Conf.						Overall
Team	W		L		T	PCT	W		L		T	PCT
Eastern
No. 12 South Carolina ^{x}‍‍‍^{y}	20	–	9	–	0	.690	46	–	18	–	0	.719
No. 7 Florida ‍‍‍^{y}	19	–	10	–	0	.655	52	–	16	–	0	.765
No. 23 Vanderbilt ‍‍‍^{y}	18	–	12	–	0	.600	43	–	19	–	0	.694
Kentucky ‍‍‍	15	–	15	–	0	.500	32	–	25	–	0	.561
Georgia ‍‍‍	11	–	19	–	0	.367	27	–	30	–	0	.474
Tennessee ‍‍‍	9	–	21	–	0	.300	29	–	28	–	0	.509
Missouri ‍‍‍	9	–	21	–	0	.300	26	–	30	–	0	.464
Western
No. 10 Mississippi State ^{x}‍†‍‍^{y}	21	–	9	–	0	.700	44	–	18	–	1	.706
No. 9 Texas A&M ‍‍‡‍^{y}	20	–	10	–	0	.667	49	–	16	–	0	.754
No. 13 LSU ‍‍‍^{y}	19	–	11	–	0	.633	45	–	21	–	0	.682
Ole Miss ‍‍‍^{y}	18	–	12	–	0	.600	43	–	19	–	0	.694
Alabama ‍‍‍	15	–	15	–	0	.500	32	–	26	–	0	.552
Auburn ‍‍‍	8	–	22	–	0	.267	23	–	33	–	0	.411
Arkansas ‍‍‍	7	–	23	–	0	.233	26	–	29	–	0	.473
x – Division champion † – Conference champion ‡ – Tournament champion y – Invited to the NCAA tournament Rankings from Collegiate Baseball

The 2016 Tennessee Volunteers baseball team represent the University of Tennessee in the 2016 NCAA Division I baseball season. The Volunteers play their home games in Lindsey Nelson Stadium. The team is coached by Dave Serrano in his fifth season as head coach at Tennessee.

== Roster ==
2016 Tennessee Volunteers active roster
Pitchers: 9 – LHP – Zach Reid – Sophomore – Montgomery, AL; 11 – RHP – Kyle Serrano – Junior – Knoxville, Tenn; 12 – RHP – Hunter Martin – Junior – Murfreesboro, TN; 15 – RHP – Will Neely – Freshman – Knoxville, TN; 16 – RHP/OF – Jacob Westphal – Sophomore – Sioux City, IA; 20 – LHP – Aaron Soto – Sophomore – Miami Lakes, FL; 23 – LHP – Zach Warren – Sophomore – Vineland, NJ; 24 – LHP – Alex Harper-Cook – Maryville, TN; 27 – RHP – Steven Kane – Senior – Huntington Beach, CA; 28 – RHP – Jon Lipinski – Junior – Coral Springs, FL; 29 – RHP/OF – Daniel Vasquez – Freshman – El Cajon, CA; 34 – RHP – Quint Robinson – Sophomore – Nashville, TN; 37 – RHP – Richard Jackson – Sophomore – Atlanta, GA; 41 – RHP – Eric Freeman – (redshirt) Sophomore – Knoxville, TN; 42 – RHP – Tei Vanderford – (redshirt) Junior – Glendale, CA; 46 – LHP – Andy Cox – Senior – Bartlett, TN	Catchers: 14 – Tyler Schultz – (redshirt) Senior – Huntington Beach, CA; 21 – Dominick Cammarata – (redshirt) Freshman – Asheville, NC; 35 – Nico Mascia – Freshman – Knoxville, TN; 44 – Sean Skelly – Freshman – Mission Viejo, CA; Infielders: 2 – Brett Langhorn – Sophomore – Mechanicsville, VA; 4 – Jared Pruett – Senior – Dallas, TX; 6 – Jeff Moberg – Senior – Murrieta, CA; 7 – Jordan Rodgers – Junior – Bartlett, TN; 8 – Leno Ramirez – Junior – Dover, OK; 13 – Nick Senzel – Junior – Knoxville, TN; 17 – Derek Lance – Senior – Knoxville, TN; 19 – Max Bartlett – Junior – Starkville, MS; Outfielders: 1 – Brodie Leftridge – Sophomore – Baltimore, MD; 5 – Chris Hall – Senior – Lebanon, TN; 22 – Matt Waldren – Junior – Phoenix, AZ; 25 – Bryant Harris – Freshman – Hampton, GA; 31 – Benito Santiago – Sophomore – Pembroke Pines, FL; 32 – (UTL) Daniel Neal – Freshman – London, KY; 36 – Dathan Prewett – Junior – Columbia, TN; 40 – Vincent Jackson – Senior – McDonough, GA	Coaches: Dave Serrano (fifth year); Larry Simcox – assistant; Aric Thomas – assistant

== Schedule and results ==
2016 Tennessee Volunteers baseball game log
Regular season

February
Date	Opponent	Site/stadium	Score	Win	Loss	Save	TV	Attendance	Overall record	SEC record
Feb 19	Memphis*	Lindsey Nelson Stadium • Knoxville, TN	8–4	**Cox** (1–0)	Hathcock (0–1)	None		1,768	1–0	–
Feb 20	Memphis*	Lindsey Nelson Stadium • Knoxville, TN	8–13	Alexander (1–0)	**Serrano** (0–1)	None		1,765	1–1	–
Feb 21	Memphis*	Lindsey Nelson Stadium • Knoxville, TN	5–2	**Warren** (1–0)	Ferguson (0–1)	**Lipinski** (1)		1,215	2–1	–
Feb 26	at Grand Canyon*	Brazell Stadium • Phoenix, AZ (Grand Canyon Classic)	25–8	**Freeman** (1–0)	Perez (0–1)	None		1,987	3–1	–
Feb 27	vs Saint Mary's*	Brazell Stadium • Phoenix, AZ (Grand Canyon Classic)	6–3	**Warren** (2–0)	York (1–1)	None		337	4–1	–
Feb 28	vs Central Michigan*	Brazell Stadium • Phoenix, AZ (Grand Canyon Classic)	20–1	**Martin** (1–0)	Leatherman (0–1)	None		377	5–1	–

March
Date	Opponent	Site/stadium	Score	Win	Loss	Save	TV	Attendance	Overall record	SEC record
Mar 2	Cincinnati*	Lindsey Nelson Stadium • Knoxville, TN	7–1	**Vasquez** (1–0)	Alldred (0–1)	None		1,096	6–1	–
Mar 4	vs Maryland*	Clark–LeClair Stadium • Greenville, NC (Keith LeClair Classic)	9–10	Stiles (1–0)	**Cox** (1–1)	Selmer (3)		2,237	6–2	–
Mar 5	at East Carolina*	Clark–LeClair Stadium • Greenville, NC (Keith LeClair Classic)	5–2	**Warren** (3–0)	Wolfe (2–1)	None		2,984	7–2	–
Mar 6	vs Southeastern Louisiana*	Clark–LeClair Stadium • Greenville, NC (Keith LeClair Classic)	3–5	Granier (1–0)	**Kane** (0–1)	None		2,520	7–3	–
Mar 8	Western Kentucky*	Lindsey Nelson Stadium • Knoxville, TN	0–6	Weins (1–1)	**Vasquez** (1–1)	None		1,787	7–4	–
Mar 9	at East Tennessee State*	Thomas Stadium • Johnson City, TN	11–2	**Soto** (1–0)	Smith (1–2)	None		1,344	8–4	–
Mar 11	UC Irvine*	Lindsey Nelson Stadium • Knoxville, TN	12–1	**Warren** (4–0)	Surrey (1–1)	None	SECN+	1,381	9–4	–
Mar 12	UC Irvine*	Lindsey Nelson Stadium • Knoxville, TN	14–4	**Cox** (2–1)	Vetrovec (2–2)	None		2,089	10–4	–
	UC Irvine*	Lindsey Nelson Stadium • Knoxville, TN	0–2	Bishop (3–1)	**Vasquez** (1–2)	Faucher (3)		2,089	10–5	–
Mar 15	at UNC Asheville*	Greenwood Baseball Field • Asheville, NC	7–3	**Martin** (2–0)	Orr (0–2)	None		2,153	11–5	–
Mar 18	#8 Ole Miss	Lindsey Nelson Stadium • Knoxville, TN	3–2	**Lipinski** (1–0)	Short (1–1)	None	SECN+	1,555	12–5	1–0
Mar 19	#8 Ole Miss	Lindsey Nelson Stadium • Knoxville, TN	4–6	Feigl (2–0)	**Freeman** (1–1)	Short (5)	SECN+	1,972	12–6	1–1
Mar 20	#8 Ole Miss	Lindsey Nelson Stadium • Knoxville, TN	7–10	Pagnozzi (4-0)	**Kane** (0-2)	None	SECN+	1,572	12–7	1–2
Mar 22	Tennessee Tech*	Lindsey Nelson Stadium • Knoxville, TN	9–1	**Soto** (2–0)	Osborne (0-1)	None	SECN	1,743	13–7	–
Mar 25	at #22 Alabama	Sewell–Thomas Stadium • Tuscaloosa, AL	3–7	Bramblett (3-0)	**Warren** (4-1)	None	SECN+	5,867	13–8	1–3
Mar 26	at #22 Alabama	Sewell–Thomas Stadium • Tuscaloosa, AL	3–11	Cameron (2-1)	**Cox** (2-2)	None	SECN	3,842	13–9	1–4
	at #22 Alabama	Sewell–Thomas Stadium • Tuscaloosa, AL	6–3	**Reid** (1-0)	Foster (1-2)	**Vasquez** (1)	SECN	4,405	14–9	2–4
Mar 29	Middle Tennessee*	Lindsey Nelson Stadium • Knoxville, TN	9–2	**Freeman** (2–1)	Alton (2–2)	None		1,625	15–9	–
Mar 30	UNC Asheville*	Lindsey Nelson Stadium • Knoxville, TN	11–0	**Harper-Cook** (1–0)	Wilson (0–1)	None		1,312	16–9	–

April
Date	Opponent	Site/stadium	Score	Win	Loss	Save	TV	Attendance	Overall record	SEC record
Apr 1	#12 Kentucky	Lindsey Nelson Stadium • Knoxville, TN	14–5	**Soto** (3–0)	Brown (1–5)	None	SECN+	2,765	17–9	3–4
Apr 2	#12 Kentucky	Lindsey Nelson Stadium • Knoxville, TN	4–5	Beggs (7–0)	**Warren** (4–2)	Hjelle (4)	SECN+	2,827	17–10	3–5
Apr 3	#12 Kentucky	Lindsey Nelson Stadium • Knoxville, TN	2–10	Cody (3–1)	**Cox** (2–3)	None	SECN+	2,670	17–11	3–6
Apr 6	Morehead State*	Lindsey Nelson Stadium • Knoxville, TN	6–5	**Lipinski** (2-0)	Wilson (0-3)	None		1,344	18–11	–
Apr 8	at #6 South Carolina	Carolina Stadium • Columbia, SC	6–7	Schmidt (7–1)	**Soto** (3–1)	Reagan (9)	SECN+	7,890	18–12	3–7
Apr 9	at #6 South Carolina	Carolina Stadium • Columbia, SC	4–7	Webb (7–1)	**Warren** (4–3)	Scott (1)	SECN+	8,242	18–13	3–8
Apr 10	at #6 South Carolina	Carolina Stadium • Columbia, SC	3–4	Johnson (1–1)	**Kane** (0–3)	Reagan (10)	SECN+	7,314	18–14	3–9
Apr 12	Appalachian State*	Lindsey Nelson Stadium • Knoxville, TN	7–5	**Freeman** (3–1)	Hardin (1–5)	None		1,502	19–14	–
Apr 14	at Auburn	Samford Stadium – Hitchcock Field at Plainsman Park • Auburn, AL	13–4	**Soto** (4–1)	Braymer (3–3)	None	SECN	2,555	20–14	4–9
Apr 15	at Auburn	Samford Stadium – Hitchcock Field at Plainsman Park • Auburn, AL	0–2	Camp (3–2)	**Warren** (4–4)	None	SECN	2,386	20–15	4–10
Apr 16	at Auburn	Samford Stadium – Hitchcock Field at Plainsman Park • Auburn, AL	6–7	Klobosits (2–2)	**Lipinski** (2–1)	None	SECN+	3,236	20–16	4–11
Apr 19	at Middle Tennessee*	Reese Smith Jr. Field • Murfreesboro, TN	4–2	**Kane** (1–3)	Ring (1–2)	**Martin** (1)		2,156	21–16	–
Apr 22	#6 Vanderbilt	Lindsey Nelson Stadium • Knoxville, TN	0–6	Sheffield (6–2)	**Soto** (4–2)	None	SECN+	2,084	21–17	4–12
Apr 23	#6 Vanderbilt	Lindsey Nelson Stadium • Knoxville, TN	2–1	**Warren** (5–4)	Wright (4–3)	**Cox** (1)	SECN+	2,620	22–17	5–12
Apr 24	#6 Vanderbilt	Lindsey Nelson Stadium • Knoxville, TN	5–3	**Neely** (1–0)	Bowden (2–1)	**Cox** (2)	SECN+	3,136	23–17	6–12
Apr 26	Eastern Kentucky*	Lindsey Nelson Stadium • Knoxville, TN	4–3	**Martin** (3–0)	Mroz (0–3)	None		1,187	24–17	–
Apr 27	Alabama State*	Lindsey Nelson Stadium • Knoxville, TN	0–3	Alicea (2–0)	**Harper-Cook** (1–1)	Taylor (1)		1,274	24–18	–
Apr 29	at Missouri	Taylor Stadium • Columbia, MO	4–5	McClain (4-2)	**Cox** (2-4)	Bartlett (3)	SECN+	615	24–19	6–13
Apr 30	at Missouri	Taylor Stadium • Columbia, MO	5–6	Tribby (3–3)	**Cox** (2–5)	None	ESPNU	1,070	24–20	6–14

May
Date	Opponent	Site/stadium	Score	Win	Loss	Save	TV	Attendance	Overall record	SEC record
May 1	at Missouri	Taylor Stadium • Columbia, MO	3–8	Plassmeyer (4-4)	**Neely** (1-1)	None	SECN	720	24–21	6–15
May 6	#1 Florida	Lindsey Nelson Stadium • Knoxville, TN	2–7	Shore (9–0)	**Neely** (1–2)	None	SECN+	2,247	24–22	6–16
May 7	#1 Florida	Lindsey Nelson Stadium • Knoxville, TN	5–2	**Cox** (3–5)	Singer (2–1)	None	SECN+	2,197	25–22	7–16
May 8	#1 Florida	Lindsey Nelson Stadium • Knoxville, TN	3–9	Faedo (9-1)	**Martin** (3-1)	None	SECN+	2,453	25–23	7–17
May 10	Belmont*	Lindsey Nelson Stadium • Knoxville, TN	5–3	**Lipinski** (3-1)	Queener (2-3)	**Cox** (3)		1,221	26–23	–
May 13	#21 LSU	Lindsey Nelson Stadium • Knoxville, TN	1–2	Lange (7–3)	**Cox** (3–6)	Newman (5)	SECN+	2,349	26–24	7–18
May 14	#21 LSU	Lindsey Nelson Stadium • Knoxville, TN	3–11	Poché (6-4)	**Warren** (5-5)	Reynolds (1)	SECN	2,297	26–25	7–19
May 15	#21 LSU	Lindsey Nelson Stadium • Knoxville, TN	7–10	Bugg (1–2)	**Martin** (3–2)	None	SECN+	2,393	26–26	7–20
May 17	ETSU*	Lindsey Nelson Stadium • Knoxville, TN	11–2	**Harper-Cook** (2-1)	Haeberle (3-3)	None		1,548	27–26	–
May 19	at Georgia	Foley Field • Athens, GA	8–10	Moody (2–3)	**Neely** (1–3)	Holder (1)	SECN+	1,809	27–27	7–21
May 20	at Georgia	Foley Field • Athens, GA	5–4	**Soto** (5-2)	Holder (4-4)	None	SECN+	1,802	28–27	8–21
May 21	at Georgia	Foley Field • Athens, GA	5–2	**Soto** (6–2)	Brown (2–2)	None	SECN	2,105	29–27	9–21

Postseason

SEC Tournament
Date	Opponent	Site/stadium	Score	Win	Loss	Save	TV	Attendance	Overall record	SECT Record
May 24	vs. #21 (5); LSU	Hoover Metropolitan Stadium • Hoover, AL	4–5	Newman (1–0)	**Martin** (3–3)	None	SECN	7,287	29–28	0–1

Legend: = Win = Loss = Postponement
Bold = Tennessee team member

== Record vs. conference opponents ==
Last two do not qualify for conf. tourn. Blank are not scheduled. Blue are home games, otherwise away.

2016 SEC baseball records Source: 2016 SEC baseball game results
Team	W–L	ALA	ARK	AUB	FLA	UGA	KEN	LSU	MSU	MIZZ	MISS	SCAR	TENN	TAMU	VAN	Team	Div	SR	SW
ALA	15–15		3–0	2–1	.	1–2	1–2	2–1	1–2	.	2–1	0–3	2–1	1–2	.	ALA	W5	5–5	1–1
ARK	7–23	0–3		3–0	0–3	.	2–1	0–3	0–3	1–2	0–3	0–3	.	1–2	.	ARK	W7	2–8	1–6
AUB	8–22	1–2	0–3		.	.	2–1	1–2	0–3	1–2	0–3	.	2–1	1–2	0–3	AUB	W6	2–8	0–4
FLA	19–10	.	3–0	.		2–1	1–2	1–2	1–2	3–0	.	1–1	2–1	3–0	2–1	FLA	E2	6–3	3–0
UGA	11–19	2–1	.	.	1–2		1–2	.	1–2	2–1	1–2	2–1	1–2	0–3	0–3	UGA	E5	3–7	0–2
KEN	15–15	2–1	1–2	1–2	2–1	2–1		.	.	2–1	0–3	2–1	2–1	.	1–2	KEN	E4	6–4	0–1
LSU	19–11	1–2	3–0	2–1	2–1	.	.		1–2	3–0	1–2	.	3–0	1–2	2–1	LSU	W3	6–4	3–0
MSU	21–9	2–1	3–0	3–0	2–1	2–1	.	2–1		3–0	2–1	.	.	0–3	2–1	MSU	W1	9–1	3–1
MIZZ	9–21	.	2–1	2–1	0–3	1–2	1–2	0–3	0–3		.	0–3	3–0	.	0–3	MIZZ	E7	2–8	1–4
MISS	18–12	1–2	3–0	3–0	.	2–1	3–0	2–1	1–2	.		0–3	2–1	1–2	.	MISS	W4	6–4	3–1
SCAR	20–9	3–0	3–0	.	1–1	1–2	1–2	.	.	3–0	3–0		3–0	1–2	1–2	SCAR	E1	5–4	5–0
TENN	9–21	1–2	.	1–2	1–2	2–1	1–2	0–3	.	0–3	1–2	0–3		.	2–1	TENN	E6	2–8	0–3
TAMU	20–10	2–1	2–1	2–1	0–3	3–0	.	2–1	3–0	.	2–1	2–1	.		2–1	TAMU	W2	9–1	2–1
VAN	18–12	.	.	3–0	1–2	3–0	2–1	1–2	1–2	3–0	.	2–1	1–2	1–2		VAN	E3	5–5	3–0
Team	W–L	ALA	ARK	AUB	FLA	UGA	KEN	LSU	MSU	MIZZ	MISS	SCAR	TENN	TAMU	VAN	Team	Div	SR	SW

Updated for entire regular season.
