= 2016 Arkansas Razorbacks baseball team =

American college baseball season

2016 Arkansas Razorbacks baseball
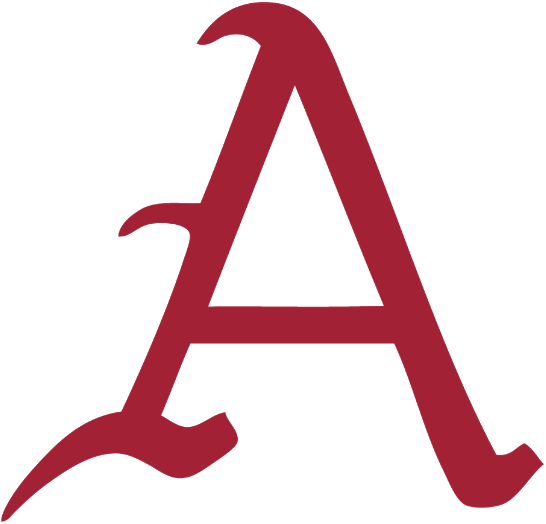
- Conference: Southeastern Conference
- West
- Record: 26–29 (7–23 SEC)
- Head coach: Dave Van Horn
- Hitting coach: Tony Vitello
- Pitching coach: Dave Jorn
- Home stadium: Baum Stadium

2016 Southeastern Conference baseball standings
	Conf.						Overall
Team	W		L		T	PCT	W		L		T	PCT
Eastern
No. 12 South Carolina ^{x}‍‍‍^{y}	20	–	9	–	0	.690	46	–	18	–	0	.719
No. 7 Florida ‍‍‍^{y}	19	–	10	–	0	.655	52	–	16	–	0	.765
No. 23 Vanderbilt ‍‍‍^{y}	18	–	12	–	0	.600	43	–	19	–	0	.694
Kentucky ‍‍‍	15	–	15	–	0	.500	32	–	25	–	0	.561
Georgia ‍‍‍	11	–	19	–	0	.367	27	–	30	–	0	.474
Tennessee ‍‍‍	9	–	21	–	0	.300	29	–	28	–	0	.509
Missouri ‍‍‍	9	–	21	–	0	.300	26	–	30	–	0	.464
Western
No. 10 Mississippi State ^{x}‍†‍‍^{y}	21	–	9	–	0	.700	44	–	18	–	1	.706
No. 9 Texas A&M ‍‍‡‍^{y}	20	–	10	–	0	.667	49	–	16	–	0	.754
No. 13 LSU ‍‍‍^{y}	19	–	11	–	0	.633	45	–	21	–	0	.682
Ole Miss ‍‍‍^{y}	18	–	12	–	0	.600	43	–	19	–	0	.694
Alabama ‍‍‍	15	–	15	–	0	.500	32	–	26	–	0	.552
Auburn ‍‍‍	8	–	22	–	0	.267	23	–	33	–	0	.411
Arkansas ‍‍‍	7	–	23	–	0	.233	26	–	29	–	0	.473
x – Division champion † – Conference champion ‡ – Tournament champion y – Invited to the NCAA tournament Rankings from Collegiate Baseball

The 2016 Arkansas Razorbacks baseball team represented the University of Arkansas in baseball at the Division I level in the NCAA for the 2016 season.

== Schedule and results ==
2016 Arkansas Razorbacks baseball game log
Regular Season

February
Date	Opponent	Site/stadium	Score	Win	Loss	Save	TV	Attendance	Overall record	SEC record
February 19*	Central Michigan	Baum Stadium • Fayetteville, AR	**W** 6–1	**Taccolini** (1–0)	Renzi (0–1)	None	SEC Network+	9,620	1–0	
February 20*	Central Michigan	Baum Stadium • Fayetteville, AR	**W** 4–3	**Knight** (1–0)	Deeg (0–1)	**Jackson (1)**	SEC Network+	11,341	2–0	
February 21*	Central Michigan	Baum Stadium • Fayetteville, AR	**W** 9–4	**Dahl** (1–0)	Gamble (0–1)	None	SEC Network+	7,531	3–0	
February 23*	Mississippi Valley State	Baum Stadium • Fayetteville, AR	**W** 21–4	**Campbell** (1–0)	Hodges (0–2)	None	SEC Network+	6,328	4–0	
February 24*	Mississippi Valley State	Baum Stadium • Fayetteville, AR	**W** 20–0	**Rogers** (1–0)	Arrington (0–1)	None	SEC Network+	6,513	5–0	
February 26*	vs. Rice	Minute Maid Park • Houston, TX (Houston College Classic)	**W** 5–2	**Taccolini** (2–0)	Duplantier (0–1)	**Jackson (2)**	MLB Network		6–0	
February 27*	vs. Houston	Minute Maid Park • Houston, TX (Houston College Classic)	**W** 12–3	**Teague** (1–0)	King (1–1)	None	MLB Network		7–0	
February 28*	vs. Texas Tech	Minute Maid Park • Houston, TX (Houston College Classic)	**W** 10–6	**Chadwick** (1–0)	Howard (1–1)	None	MLB Network		8–0	

March
Date	Opponent	Site/stadium	Score	Win	Loss	Save	TV	Attendance	Overall record	SEC record
March 2	Louisiana Tech	Baum Stadium • Fayetteville, AR	**L** 2–3	Clancy (3–0)	**Teague** (1–1)	Atkins (1)	SEC Network+	6,855	8–1	
March 4	Eastern Illinois	Baum Stadium • Fayetteville, AR	**W** 5–2	**Taccolini** (3–0)	Wivinis (0–3)	**Jackson (3)**	SEC Network+	7,957	9–1	
March 5	Eastern Illinois	Baum Stadium • Fayetteville, AR	**L** 8–10 (12)	Euler (1–0)	**Jackson** (0–1)	Allen (1)	None	10,422	9–2	
March 6	Eastern Illinois	Baum Stadium • Fayetteville, AR	**W** 3–2	**Teague** (2–1)	Euler (1–1)	None	SEC Network+	6,437	10–2	
March 8	Gonzaga	Baum Stadium • Fayetteville, AR	Cancelled							
March 9	Gonzaga	Baum Stadium • Fayetteville, AR	**L** 10–15	Hellinger (1–1)	**Dahl** (1–1)	Vernia (1)	SEC Network+	6,483	10–3	
March 11	Western Illinois	Baum Stadium • Fayetteville, AR	**W** 3–2 (10)	**Jackson** (1–1)	Pannell (0–1)	None	SEC Network+	6,639	11–3	
March 12	Western Illinois	Baum Stadium • Fayetteville, AR	**W** 9–3	**Knight** (2–0)	Mortillaro (0–3)	None	SEC Network+	8,655	12–3	
March 13	Western Illinois	Baum Stadium • Fayetteville, AR	**W** 3–0	**Loseke** (1–0)	Hodges (0–2)	**Rodriguez (1)**	SEC Network+	6,927	13–3	
March 15	Grambling State	Baum Stadium • Fayetteville, AR	**W** 14–4	**Campbell** (2–0)	Hoover (1–1)	None	SEC Network+	7,489	14–3	
March 16	Grambling State	Baum Stadium • Fayetteville, AR	**W** 3–2	**Alberius** (1–0)	Raiburn (0–4)	**Willey (1)**	SEC Network+	6,833	15–3	
March 18	at #12 South Carolina	Carolina Stadium • Columbia, SC	**L** 6–10	Schmidt (5–0)	**Taccolini** (3–1)	None	SEC Network+	7,511	15–4	0–1
March 19	at #12 South Carolina	Carolina Stadium • Columbia, SC	**L** 2–6	Webb (4–1)	**Teague** (2–2)	Johnson (1)	SEC Network+	7,258	15–5	0–2
March 20	at #12 South Carolina	Carolina Stadium • Columbia, SC	**L** 6–8	Reagan (1–0)	**Jackson** (1–2)	None	SEC Network+	6,867	15–6	0–3
March 25	Auburn	Baum Stadium • Fayetteville, AR	**W** 3–2	**Alberius** (2–0)	Klobosits (1–2)	None	SEC Network+	8,673	16–6	1–3
March 26	Auburn	Baum Stadium • Fayetteville, AR	**W** 14–7	**McKinney** (1–0)	Mize (1–2)	None	SEC Network+	9,303	17–6	2–3
March 27	Auburn	Baum Stadium • Fayetteville, AR	**W** 3–1	**Jackson** (2–2)	Yarbrough (2–1)	None	SEC Network+	6,675	18–6	3–3
March 29	at #16 Oklahoma State	Allie P. Reynolds Stadium • Stillwater, OK	**L** 4–5	Reed (3–1)	**Willey** (0–1)	Buffett (4)	Fox Sports+	2,418	18–7	

April
Date	Opponent	Site/stadium	Score	Win	Loss	Save	TV	Attendance	Overall record	SEC record
April 1	Missouri	Baum Stadium • Fayetteville, AR	**W** 7–6	**Willey** (1–1)	McClain (3–1)	**Jackson (4)**	SEC Network+	9,012	19–7	4–3
April 2	Missouri	Baum Stadium • Fayetteville, AR	**L** 5–8	Houck (3–2)	**McKinney** (1–1)	Tribby (1)	SECN	9,866	19–8	4–4
April 3	Missouri	Baum Stadium • Fayetteville, AR	**L** 1–10	Plassmeyer (2–2)	**Loseke** (1–1)	Sharp (4)	SECN	8,088	19–9	4–5
April 6	at Memphis	FedExPark • Memphis, TN	**W** 12–4	**Hart** (1–0)	Bowlan (1–3)	None	None	2,824	20–9	
April 8	at #14 Ole Miss	Swayze Field • Oxford, MS	**L** 3–7	Bramlett (5–2)	**Teague** (2–3)	None	SEC Network+	9,051	20–10	4–6
April 9	at #14 Ole Miss	Swayze Field • Oxford, MS	**L** 9–14	Parkinson (1–0)	**Jackson** (2–3)	None	SECN	9,747	20–11	4–7
April 10	at #14 Ole Miss	Swayze Field • Oxford, MS	**L** 7–8	Pagnozzi (5–1)	**Loseke** (1–2)	Stokes (4)	SECN	8,060	20–12	4–8
April 12	vs Louisiana–Monroe	Dickey-Stephens Park • Little Rock, AR	**W** 3–1	**Alberius** (3–0)	Herrera (1–2)	**Willey (2)**	None	7,327	21–12	
April 14	#2 Florida	Baum Stadium • Fayetteville, AR	**L** 8–12	Puk (2–2)	**Taccolini** (3–2)	Anderson (7)	ESPNU	8,348	21–13	4–9
April 15	#2 Florida	Baum Stadium • Fayetteville, AR	**L** 2–9	Shore (7–0)	**McKinney** (1–2)	None	SEC Network+	9,219	21–14	4–10
April 16	#2 Florida	Baum Stadium • Fayetteville, AR	**L** 2–8	Faedo (7–1)	**Jackson** (2–4)	None	SEC Network+	9,371	21–15	4–11
April 19	Creighton	Baum Stadium • Fayetteville, AR	**W** 6–2	**Campbell** (3–0)	Stroschein (0–1)	**Willey (3)**	SECN	6,729	22–15	
April 22	at #12 Kentucky	Cliff Hagan Stadium • Lexington, KY	**W** 1–0 (10)	**Taccolini** (4–2)	Brown (2–7)	None	SECN	2,508	23–15	5–11
April 23	at #12 Kentucky	Cliff Hagan Stadium • Lexington, KY	**W** 2–0	**Jackson** (3–4)	Beggs (7–1)	None	SEC Network+	2,319	24–15	6–11
April 23	at #12 Kentucky	Cliff Hagan Stadium • Lexington, KY	**L** 4–5	Hjelle (3–0)	**Willey** (1–2)	None	SEC Network+	2,319	24–16	6–12
April 26	Oklahoma State	Baum Stadium • Fayetteville, AR	**W** 7–6	**Teague** (3–3)	Cowan (0–1)	**Knight (1)**	SEC Network+	3,157	25–16	
April 30	#2 Texas A&M	Baum Stadium • Fayetteville, AR	**W** 9–5	**Taccolini** (5–2)	Vinson (1–2)	None	ESPN2	DH	26–16	7–12
April 30	#2 Texas A&M	Baum Stadium • Fayetteville, AR	**L** 8–11 (11)	Ecker (4–1)	**Knight** (2–1)	Larkins (1)	None	9,752	26–17	7–13

May
Date	Opponent	Site/stadium	Score	Win	Loss	Save	TV	Attendance	Overall record	SEC record
May 1	#2 Texas A&M	Baum Stadium • Fayetteville, AR	**L** 2–6	Simonds (7–1)	**McKinney** (1–3)	None	ESPNU	8,326	26–18	7–14
May 3	Missouri State	Baum Stadium • Fayetteville, AR	**L** 6–14	Knight (4–1)	**Rogers** (1–1)	None	CST	1,609	26–19	
May 6	at #13 LSU	Alex Box Stadium/Skip Bertman Field • Baton Rouge, LA	**L** 4–5	Lange (5–3)	**Taccolini** (5–3)	Newman (3)	SECN+	10,408	26–20	7–15
May 7	at #13 LSU	Alex Box Stadium/Skip Bertman Field • Baton Rouge, LA	**L** 9–10 (10)	Reynolds (2–0)	**Alberius** (3–1)	None	SECN+	10,707	26–21	7–16
May 8	at #13 LSU	Alex Box Stadium/Skip Bertman Field • Baton Rouge, LA	**L** 1–7	Gilbert (4–2)	**McKinney** (1–4)	None	SECN+	10,109	26–22	7–17
May 13	Alabama	Baum Stadium • Fayetteville, AR	**L** 6–8	Bramblett (5–3)	**Taccolini** (5–4)	Burrows (11)	SECN+	8,329	26–23	7–18
May 14	Alabama	Baum Stadium • Fayetteville, AR	**L** 4–10	Walters (5–3)	**McKinney** (1–5)	None	SECN+	8,547	26–24	7–19
May 15	Alabama	Baum Stadium • Fayetteville, AR	**L** 4–7	Burrows (2–0)	**Teague** (3–4)	None	SECN+	7,128	26–25	7–20
May 17	Missouri State	Baum Stadium • Fayetteville, AR	**L** 2–8	Knight (5–2)	**Loseke** (1–3)	None	SECN+	6,619	26–26	
May 19	at #4 Mississippi State	Dudy Noble Field • Starkville, MS	**L** 0–7	Hudson (9–3)	**Taccolini** (5–5)	None	6,822	SECN+	26–27	7–21
May 20	at #4 Mississippi State	Dudy Noble Field • Starkville, MS	**L** 1–5	Sexton (7–2)	**Campbell** (3–1)	Humphreys (7)	SECN+	7,195	26–28	7–22
May 21	at #4 Mississippi State	Dudy Noble Field • Starkville, MS	**L** 4–9	Rigby (5–1)	**Rodriguez** (0–1)	None	SECN	8,421	26–29	7–23

Legend: = Win = Loss = Postponement
Bold = Arkansas team member

== Record vs. conference opponents ==
Last two do not qualify for conf. tourn. Blank are not scheduled. Blue are home games, otherwise away.

2016 SEC baseball records Source: 2016 SEC baseball game results
Team	W–L	ALA	ARK	AUB	FLA	UGA	KEN	LSU	MSU	MIZZ	MISS	SCAR	TENN	TAMU	VAN	Team	Div	SR	SW
ALA	15–15		3–0	2–1	.	1–2	1–2	2–1	1–2	.	2–1	0–3	2–1	1–2	.	ALA	W5	5–5	1–1
ARK	7–23	0–3		3–0	0–3	.	2–1	0–3	0–3	1–2	0–3	0–3	.	1–2	.	ARK	W7	2–8	1–6
AUB	8–22	1–2	0–3		.	.	2–1	1–2	0–3	1–2	0–3	.	2–1	1–2	0–3	AUB	W6	2–8	0–4
FLA	19–10	.	3–0	.		2–1	1–2	1–2	1–2	3–0	.	1–1	2–1	3–0	2–1	FLA	E2	6–3	3–0
UGA	11–19	2–1	.	.	1–2		1–2	.	1–2	2–1	1–2	2–1	1–2	0–3	0–3	UGA	E5	3–7	0–2
KEN	15–15	2–1	1–2	1–2	2–1	2–1		.	.	2–1	0–3	2–1	2–1	.	1–2	KEN	E4	6–4	0–1
LSU	19–11	1–2	3–0	2–1	2–1	.	.		1–2	3–0	1–2	.	3–0	1–2	2–1	LSU	W3	6–4	3–0
MSU	21–9	2–1	3–0	3–0	2–1	2–1	.	2–1		3–0	2–1	.	.	0–3	2–1	MSU	W1	9–1	3–1
MIZZ	9–21	.	2–1	2–1	0–3	1–2	1–2	0–3	0–3		.	0–3	3–0	.	0–3	MIZZ	E7	2–8	1–4
MISS	18–12	1–2	3–0	3–0	.	2–1	3–0	2–1	1–2	.		0–3	2–1	1–2	.	MISS	W4	6–4	3–1
SCAR	20–9	3–0	3–0	.	1–1	1–2	1–2	.	.	3–0	3–0		3–0	1–2	1–2	SCAR	E1	5–4	5–0
TENN	9–21	1–2	.	1–2	1–2	2–1	1–2	0–3	.	0–3	1–2	0–3		.	2–1	TENN	E6	2–8	0–3
TAMU	20–10	2–1	2–1	2–1	0–3	3–0	.	2–1	3–0	.	2–1	2–1	.		2–1	TAMU	W2	9–1	2–1
VAN	18–12	.	.	3–0	1–2	3–0	2–1	1–2	1–2	3–0	.	2–1	1–2	1–2		VAN	E3	5–5	3–0
Team	W–L	ALA	ARK	AUB	FLA	UGA	KEN	LSU	MSU	MIZZ	MISS	SCAR	TENN	TAMU	VAN	Team	Div	SR	SW

Updated for entire regular season.
