= 2016 Ole Miss Rebels baseball team =

American college baseball season

2016 Ole Miss Rebels baseball

Oxford Regional, 0–2
- Conference: Southeastern Conference
- Western Division
- Record: 43–19 (18–12 SEC)
- Head coach: Mike Bianco (16th season)
- Assistant coach: Marc MacMillan (1st season)
- Hitting coach: Mike Clement (2nd season)
- Pitching coach: Carl Lafferty (10th season)
- Home stadium: Swayze Field

2016 Southeastern Conference baseball standings
	Conf.						Overall
Team	W		L		T	PCT	W		L		T	PCT
Eastern
No. 12 South Carolina ^{x}‍‍‍^{y}	20	–	9	–	0	.690	46	–	18	–	0	.719
No. 7 Florida ‍‍‍^{y}	19	–	10	–	0	.655	52	–	16	–	0	.765
No. 23 Vanderbilt ‍‍‍^{y}	18	–	12	–	0	.600	43	–	19	–	0	.694
Kentucky ‍‍‍	15	–	15	–	0	.500	32	–	25	–	0	.561
Georgia ‍‍‍	11	–	19	–	0	.367	27	–	30	–	0	.474
Tennessee ‍‍‍	9	–	21	–	0	.300	29	–	28	–	0	.509
Missouri ‍‍‍	9	–	21	–	0	.300	26	–	30	–	0	.464
Western
No. 10 Mississippi State ^{x}‍†‍‍^{y}	21	–	9	–	0	.700	44	–	18	–	1	.706
No. 9 Texas A&M ‍‍‡‍^{y}	20	–	10	–	0	.667	49	–	16	–	0	.754
No. 13 LSU ‍‍‍^{y}	19	–	11	–	0	.633	45	–	21	–	0	.682
Ole Miss ‍‍‍^{y}	18	–	12	–	0	.600	43	–	19	–	0	.694
Alabama ‍‍‍	15	–	15	–	0	.500	32	–	26	–	0	.552
Auburn ‍‍‍	8	–	22	–	0	.267	23	–	33	–	0	.411
Arkansas ‍‍‍	7	–	23	–	0	.233	26	–	29	–	0	.473
x – Division champion † – Conference champion ‡ – Tournament champion y – Invited to the NCAA tournament Rankings from Collegiate Baseball

The 2016 Ole Miss Rebels baseball team represented the University of Mississippi in the 2016 NCAA Division I baseball season. The Rebels played their home games at Swayze Field.

== Previous season ==
In 2015, the Rebels finished 30–28 overall and 15–14 in conference play. Despite entering the postseason with high hopes, the Rebels lost their only game of the SEC tournament and lost two straight in the Los Angeles Regional of the 2015 NCAA Division I baseball tournament to finish the season.

=== 2015 MLB Draft Selections ===
Four Rebels were selected in the 2015 MLB draft, along with two incoming players who chose to join the team.

Player	Position	Round	Overall	MLB Team
Scott Weathersby	Pitcher	10	298	Houston Astros
Sikes Orvis	First baseman	17	502	Chicago White Sox
**Brady Bramlett**	Pitcher	22	668	Oakland Athletics
Chad Smith†	Pitcher	23	694	Cleveland Indians
Christian Trent	Pitcher	24	721	Milwaukee Brewers
Andy Pagnozzi†	Pitcher	36	1067	Colorado Rockies

Players in bold returned to Ole Miss.
†Chad Smith and Andy Pagnozzi were drafted out of community college and high school, respectively, but decided to attend Ole Miss.

== Preseason ==
=== Preseason All-American teams ===
1st Team

- Errol Robinson – Shortstop (D1Baseball)
- Errol Robinson – Shortstop (Baseball America)

=== SEC Media poll ===
The pre-season SEC media poll of February 19, 2016 saw Ole Miss predicted to finish in fifth place in the Western Division.

Media poll (West)
Predicted Finish	Team	Votes (1st Place)
1	Texas A&M	85 (8)
2	LSU	79 (5)
3	Arkansas	65
4	Mississippi State	49 (1)
5	Ole Miss	46
6	Auburn	33
7	Alabama	28

=== Preseason All-SEC teams ===
2nd Team

- Errol Robinson – Shortstop

== Roster ==
2016 Ole Miss Rebels roster
Pitchers: 3 – Chad Smith – Junior; 10 – David Parkinson – Sophomore; 16 – Matt Denny – Senior; 17 – Will Stokes – Sophomore; 18 – Connor Green – Freshman; 19 – Andy Pagnozzi – Freshman; 21 – Brady Bramlett – (redshirt) Junior; 24 – Dallas Woolfolk – Freshman; 26 – James McArthur – Freshman; 29 – Andrew Lowe – Freshman; 33 – Sean Johnson – (redshirt) Junior; 34 – Brian Browning – Junior; 38 – Wyatt Short – Junior; 39 – Brady Feigl – Freshman; 40 – John Creel – Freshman; 65 – Parker Caracci – Freshman	Catchers: 7 – Nick Fortes – Freshman; 11 – Nic Perkins – Sophomore; 22 – Henri Lartigue – Junior; 43 – Carson Klepzig – Freshman; Infielders: 4 – Tate Blackman – Sophomore; 6 – Errol Robinson – Junior; 8 – Will Golsan – Sophomore; 25 – Colby Bortles – Junior; 28 – Ray Alejo – Freshman; 32 – Michael Fitzsimmons – (redshirt) Freshman; 35 – Micah McHugh – Freshman	Outfielders: 1 – DJ Miller – Freshman; 12 – J.B. Woodman – Junior; 14 – Cameron Dishon – Senior; 27 – Connor Cloyd – Senior; 42 – Holt Perdzock – Senior; Utility: 2 – Ryan Olenek (OF/RHP) – Freshman; 9 – Kyle Watson (INF/OF) – Sophomore

== Schedule and results ==
2016 Ole Miss Rebels baseball game log
Regular season (43–19)

February (6–1)
Date	Opponent	Rank	Site/stadium	Score	Win	Loss	Save	Attendance	Overall record	SEC record
Feb. 19	Florida International		Swayze Field; Oxford, MS	**W** 9–2	**Brady Bramlett (1–0)**	Andres Nunez (0–1)		10,129	1–0	—
Feb. 20	Florida International		Swayze Field	**W** 7–4	**Andy Pagnozzi (1–0)**	Christopher Mourelle (0–1)	**Wyatt Short (1)**	10,027	2–0	—
Feb. 21	Florida International		Swayze Field	**W** 16–5	**Sean Johnson (1–0)**	Garret Cave (0–1)		6,754	3–0	—
Feb. 24	Arkansas State		Swayze Field	**W** 4–3	**Dallas Woolfolk (1–0)**	Bradey Welsh (0–1)		6,262	4–0	—
Feb. 26	No. 2 Louisville		Swayze Field	**W** 6–5	**Brady Bramlett (2–0)**	Kyle Funkhouser (1–1)	**Wyatt Short (2)**	9,088	5–0	—
Feb. 27	No. 2 Louisville		Swayze Field	**L** 0–4	Brendan McKay (2–0)	**Chad Smith (0–1)**		10,561	5–1	—
Feb. 28	No. 2 Louisville		Swayze Field	**W** 6–5	**Sean Johnson (2–0)**	Drew Harrington (1–1)	**Wyatt Short (3)**	9,010	6–1	—

March (14–4)
Date	Opponent	Rank	Site/stadium	Score	Win	Loss	Save	Attendance	Overall record	SEC record
March 2	Memphis		Swayze Field	**W** 9–7	**Andy Pagnozzi (2–0)**	Alex Hicks (0–1)	**Will Stokes (1)**	6,924	7–1	—
March 4	vs. Ball State		Springs Brooks Stadium; Conway, SC	**W** 7–3	**Brady Bramlett (3–0)**	Kevin Marnon (1–2)	**Dallas Woolfolk (1)**	118	8–1	—
March 5	vs. Coastal Carolina		Springs Brooks Stadium	**W** 8–2	**Chad Smith (1–1)**	Tyler Poole (2–1)		1,789	9–1	—
March 6	vs. Cincinnati		Springs Brooks Stadium	**W** 7–1	**Sean Johnson (3–0)**	Doug Lowe II (0–1)		123	10–1	—
March 8	Southeast Missouri	No. 13	Swayze Field	**W** 10–2	**James McArthur (1–0)**	Jacob Lawrence (0–1)		7,354	11–1	—
March 9	Southeast Missouri	No. 13	Swayze Field	**W** 6–4	**Wyatt Short (1–0)**	Brady Wright (0–2)		6,481	12–1	—
March 11	Grambling State	No. 13	Swayze Field	**W** 15–2	**Brady Bramlett (4–0)**	Caleb Nunez (0–1)		6,380	13–1	—
March 13 (1)	Grambling State	No. 13	Swayze Field	**W** 7–3^{7}	**Chad Smith (2–1)**	Tanner Raiburn (0–3)	**Wyatt Short (4)**	7,301 (DH)	14–1	—
March 13 (2)	Grambling State	No. 13	Swayze Field	**W** 6–1^{7}	**Brady Feigl (1–0)**	Isaac O'Bear (2–2)	**Will Stokes (2)**	7,301 (DH)	15–1	—
March 15	at UAB	No. 10	Regions Field; Birmingham, AL	**W** 8–1	**Andy Pagnozzi (3–0)**	Adam Lamar (2–1)		2,150	16–1	—
March 16	at UAB	No. 10	Regions Field	**W** 5–1	**James McArthur (2–0)**	Stephen Baggett (0–2)		1,050	17–1	—
March 18	at Tennessee	No. 10	Lindsey Nelson Stadium; Knoxville, TN	**L** 2–3	Jon Lipinski (1–0)	**Wyatt Short (1–1)**		1,555	17–2	0–1
March 19	at Tennessee	No. 10	Lindsey Nelson Stadium	**W** 6–4	**Brady Feigl (2–0)**	Eric Freeman (1–1)	**Wyatt Short (5)**	1,972	18–2	1–1
March 20	at Tennessee	No. 10	Lindsey Nelson Stadium	**W** 10–7	**Andy Pagnozzi (4–0)**	Steven Kane (0–2)		1,572	19–2	2–1
March 22	UT Martin	No. 9	Swayze Field	**W** 8–2	**James McArthur (3–0)**	Jake Patzner (1–2)		7,181	20–2	2–1
March 24	No. 10 South Carolina	No. 9	Swayze Field	**L** 1–5	Clarke Schmidt (6–0)	**Brady Bramlett (4–1)**	Josh Reagan (7)	8,167	20–3	2–2
March 25	No. 10 South Carolina	No. 9	Swayze Field	**L** 5–9	Braden Webb (5–1)	**Chad Smith (2–2)**		9,064	20–4	2–3
March 26	No. 10 South Carolina	No. 9	Swayze Field	**L** 0–4	Adam Hill (5–0)	**Andy Pagnozzi (4–0)**	Tyler Johnson (2)	10,184	20–5	2–4

April (13–7)
Date	Opponent	Rank	Site/stadium	Score	Win	Loss	Save	Attendance	Overall record	SEC record
April 1	at No. 12 Mississippi State	No. 11	Dudy Noble Field; Starkville, MS	**L** 1–3	Dakota Hudson (4–1)	**Brady Bramlett (4–2)**		10,152	20–6	2–5
April 2	at No. 12 Mississippi State	No. 11	Dudy Noble Field	**L** 2–6	Austin Sexton (3–1)	**Chad Smith (2–3)**		11,515	20–7	2–6
April 3	at No. 12 Mississippi State	No. 11	Dudy Noble Field	**W** 8–5	**Wyatt Short (2–1)**	Ryan Rigby (3–1)	**Will Stokes (3)**	10,164	21–7	3–6
April 5	vs. Southern Miss	No. 15	Trustmark Park; Pearl, MS	**W** 8–5	**James McArthur (4–1)**	Mason Walley (1–2)		4,104	22–7	3–6
April 8	No. 21 Arkansas	No. 15	Swayze Field	**W** 7–3	**Brady Bramlett (5–2)**	James Teague (2–3)		9,051	23–7	4–6
April 9	No. 21 Arkansas	No. 15	Swayze Field	**W** 14–9	**David Parkinson (1–0)**	Zach Jackson (2–3)		9,747	24–7	5–6
April 10	No. 21 Arkansas	No. 15	Swayze Field	**W** 8–7	**Andy Pagnozzi (5–1)**	Barrett Loseke (1–2)	**Will Stokes (4)**	8,060	25–7	6–6
April 13	Southern Miss	No. 11	Swayze Field	**L** 1–5	Cody Livingston (2–2)	**Matt Denny (0–1)**	Nick Sandlin (6)	7,437	25–8	6–6
April 15	at Alabama	No. 11	Sewell-Thomas Stadium; Tuscaloosa, AL	**W** 4–0	**Brady Bramlett (6–2)**	Geoffrey Bramblett (3–2)	**Wyatt Short (6)**	5,950	26–8	7–6
April 16	at Alabama	No. 11	Sewell-Thomas Stadium	**L** 0–2	Jake Walters (3–3)	**David Parkinson (1–1)**	Thomas Burrows (9)	6,385	26–9	7–7
April 17	at Alabama	No. 11	Sewell-Thomas Stadium	**L** 2–7	Nick Eicholtz (3–1)	**Andy Pagnozzi (5–2)**	Dylan Duarte (2)	6,354	26–10	7–8
April 19	at Memphis	No. 16	AutoZone Park; Memphis, TN	**W** 7–0	**James McArthur (5–0)**	Jonathan Bowlan (1–4)		2,272	27–10	7–8
April 20	Murray State	No. 16	Swayze Field	**W** 8–3	**Chad Smith (3–3)**	Brad Boegel (0–1)		7,506	28–10	7–8
April 22	Auburn	No. 16	Swayze Field	**W** 6–4	**Brady Feigl (3–0)**	Gabe Klobosits (2–3)	**Will Stokes (5)**	9,716	29–10	8–8
April 23	Auburn	No. 16	Swayze Field	**W** 7–4	**David Parkinson (2–1)**	Justin Camp (3–3)	**Will Stokes (6)**	10,102	30–10	9–8
April 24	Auburn	No. 16	Swayze Field	**W** 6–5	**Andy Pagnozzi (6–2)**	Gabe Klobosits (2–4)		7,527	31–10	10–8
April 26	vs. No. 4 Mississippi State; Governor's Cup	No. 12	Trustmark Park	**L** 0–2	Zac Houston (3–0)	**Chad Smith (3–4)**	Jacob Billingsley (1)	8,542	31–11	10–8
April 28	No. 13 LSU	No. 12	Swayze Field	**W** 7–6	**Brady Feigl (4–0)**	Parker Bugg (0–2)	**Wyatt Short (7)**	8,472	32–11	11–8
April 29	No. 13 LSU	No. 12	Swayze Field	**L** 3–6	Alex Lange (5–3)	**David Parkinson (2–2)**		8,564	32–12	11–9
April 30	No. 13 LSU	No. 12	Swayze Filed	**W** 12–2	**Andy Pagnozzi (7–2)**	John Valek III (6–2)		8,831	33–12	12–9

May (7–4)
Date	Opponent	Rank	Site/stadium	Score	Win	Loss	Save	Attendance	Overall record	SEC record
May 4	Arkansas–Pine Bluff	No. 10	Swayze Field	**W** 12–1	**Chad Smith (4–4)**	Humbe Medina (4–5)		8,174	34–12	12–9
May 6	at Georgia	No. 10	Foley Field; Athens, GA	**W** 6–4	**Andy Pagnozzi (8–2)**	Robert Tyler (3–5)	**Wyat Short (8)**	2,433	35–12	13–9
May 7	at Georgia	No. 10	Foley Field	**W** 7–3	**David Parkinson (3–2)**	Connor Jones (5–5)	**Wyatt Short (9)**	3,011	36–12	14–9
May 8	at Georgia	No. 10	Foley Field	**L** 2–13	Heath Holder (3–3)	**James McArthur (5–1)**		2,039	36–13	14–10
May 12	Kentucky	No. 11	Swayze Field	**W** 3–1	**Brady Bramlett (7–2)**	Zack Brown (2–10)	**Wyatt Short (10)**	8,013	37–13	15–10
May 13	Kentucky	No. 11	Swayze Field	**W** 14–2	**David Parkinson (4–2)**	Dustin Beggs (8–2)	**Andy Pagnozzi (1)**	9,142	38–13	16–10
May 14	Kentucky	No. 11	Swayze Field	**W** 7–5	**Will Stokes (1–0)**	Sean Hjelle (4–1)		8,704	39–13	17–10
May 17	at Arkansas State	No. 6	Tomlinson Stadium–Kell Field; Jonesboro, AR	**L** 6–8	Zach Haake (1–0)	**Sean Johnson (3–1)**	Tanner Kirby (2)	753	39–14	17–10
May 19	at No. 2 Texas A&M	No. 6	Blue Bell Park; College Station, TX	**L** 6–1	Brigham Hill (7–1)	**Brady Bramlett (7–3)**		4,494	39–15	17–11
May 20	at No. 2 Texas A&M	No. 6	Blue Bell Park	**L** 5–11	Stephen Kolek (3–0)	**David Parkinson (4–3)**	Andrew Vinson (2)	5,876	39–16	17–12
May 21	at No. 2 Texas A&M	No. 6	Blue Bell Park	**W** 3–2	**Will Stokes (2–0)**	Kyle Simonds (8–3)	**Wyatt Short (11)**	6,559	40–16	18–12

Postseason (3–3)

SEC Tournament (3–1)
Date	Opponent	Seed	Site/stadium	Score	Win	Loss	Save	Attendance	Overall record	SECT record
May 24	vs. (10) Georgia	(7)	Hoover Metropolitan Stadium; Hoover, AL	**W** 5–1	**Brady Bramlett (8–3)**	Heath Holder (4–5)		4,612	41–16	1–0
May 25	vs. (2) South Carolina	(7)	Hoover Metropolitan Stadium	**W** 10–4	**David Parkinson (5–3)**	Clarke Schmidt (9–3)	**Will Stokes (7)**	5,637	42–16	2–0
May 26	vs. (6) Vanderbilt	(7)	Hoover Metropolitan Stadium	**W** 12–9	**James McArthur (6–1)**	Jordan Sheffield (8–5)			43–16	3–0
May 28	vs. (3) Texas A&M	(7)	Hoover Metropolitan Stadium	**L** 8–12	Corbin Martin (2–1)	**Wyatt Short (2–2)**	Marck Ecker (6)		43–17	3–1

NCAA Division I baseball tournament-Oxford Regional (0–2)
Date	Opponent	Seed	Site/stadium	Score	Win	Loss	Save	Attendance	Overall record	NCAAT record
June 3	vs. (4) Utah	(1)	Swayze Field	**L** 5–6^{10}	Riley Ottensen (2–2)	**Wyatt Short (2–3)**	Dylan Drachler (9)	10,166	43–18	0–1
June 4	vs. (2) Tulane	(1)	Swayze Field	**L** 5–6	Corey Merrill (4–1)	**Will Stokes (2–1)**		9,467	43–19	0–2

Legend: = Win = Loss
Bold = Ole Miss team member

*Rankings are based on the team's current ranking in the Coaches Poll.

== Oxford Regional ==
Oxford Regional Teams
(1) Ole Miss Rebels	(2) Tulane Green Wave	(3) Boston College Eagles	(4) Utah Utes

First round
1	Ole Miss	5
4	Utah	6^{10}
3	Boston College	7
2	Tulane	2
Lower round 1
1	Ole Miss	5
2	Tulane	6

Semi-finals
4	Utah	3
3	Boston College	4
Lower final
2	Tulane	4
4	Utah	1

Finals
3	Boston College
2	Tulane

Oxford Regional Round 1
(4) Utah Utes	vs.	(1) Ole Miss Rebels

June 3, 2016, 7:05 pm (CDT) at Swayze Field in Oxford, MS
Team	1	2	3	4	5	6	7	8	9	10	R	H	E
(4) Utah	0	1	0	0	1	3	0	0	0	1	6	9	0
(1) Ole Miss	0	0	1	0	4	0	0	0	0	0	5	7	0
WP: Riley Ottesen (2–2) LP: Wyatt Short (2–3) Sv: Dylan Drachler (9); Home runs: UTAH: None; MISS: Kyle Watson (2); Attendance: 10,166

Oxford Regional Round 1 – Elimination Game
(2) Tulane Green Wave	vs.	(1) Ole Miss Rebels

June 4, 2016, 1:05 pm (CDT) at Swayze Field in Oxford, MS
Team	1	2	3	4	5	6	7	8	9	R	H	E
(2) Tulane	0	1	0	1	0	0	2	0	2	6	9	0
(1) Ole Miss	1	0	0	0	2	0	2	0	0	5	8	0
WP: Corey Merrill (4–1) LP: Will Stokes (2–1); Home runs: TUL: Jake Rogers (7); Hunter Williams (7, 8); MISS: Colby Bortles (8); Kyle Watson (3); Attendance: 9,467

== Awards and honors ==
=== Award watch lists ===
Award watch lists
Player	Award	Date awarded	Ref.
Wyatt Short	NCBWA Stopper of the Year Award Preseason Watch List	February 15, 2016	
Brady Bramlett	National Pitcher of the Year Watch List	April 21, 2016	
Wyatt Short	NCBWA Stopper of the Year Award Midseason Watch List	April 28, 2016	
Henri Lartigue	Johnny Bench Award Watch List	May 4, 2016	
J.B. Woodman	Ferriss Trophy Finalist	May 16, 2016	
Henri Lartigue	Johnny Bench Award Semifinalist	May 18, 2016	

=== Regular season awards ===
Regular season awards
Player	Award	Date awarded	Ref.
James McArthur	SEC Freshman of the Week	April 25, 2016	
J.B. Woodman	SEC Player of the Week	May 2, 2016	
J.B. Woodman	NCBWA National Hitter of the Week	May 3, 2016	
J.B. Woodman	ABCA/Rawlings Second Team All-Region (South), OF	June 15, 2016	

=== All-SEC Awards ===
All-SEC Awards
Player	Award	Date awarded	Ref.
J.B. Woodman	First Team All-SEC, OF	May 23, 2016	
Henri Lartigue	First Team All-SEC, C	May 23, 2016	
Tate Blackman	Second Team All-SEC, 2B	May 23, 2016	
J.B. Woodman	SEC All-Defensive Team	May 23, 2016	

=== All-American Awards ===
All-American Awards
Player	Award	Date awarded	Ref.
Brady Feigl	Collegiate Baseball Freshman All-American, RP	June 8, 2016	
James McArthur	Collegiate Baseball Freshman All-American, SP	June 8, 2016	
Andy Pagnozzi	Collegiate Baseball Freshman All-American, RP	June 8, 2016	
J.B. Woodman	Perfect Game Second Team All-American, OF	June 27, 2016	

== Record vs. conference opponents ==
Last two do not qualify for conf. tourn. Blank are not scheduled. Blue are home games, otherwise away.

2016 SEC baseball records Source: 2016 SEC baseball game results
Team	W–L	ALA	ARK	AUB	FLA	UGA	KEN	LSU	MSU	MIZZ	MISS	SCAR	TENN	TAMU	VAN	Team	Div	SR	SW
ALA	15–15		3–0	2–1	.	1–2	1–2	2–1	1–2	.	2–1	0–3	2–1	1–2	.	ALA	W5	5–5	1–1
ARK	7–23	0–3		3–0	0–3	.	2–1	0–3	0–3	1–2	0–3	0–3	.	1–2	.	ARK	W7	2–8	1–6
AUB	8–22	1–2	0–3		.	.	2–1	1–2	0–3	1–2	0–3	.	2–1	1–2	0–3	AUB	W6	2–8	0–4
FLA	19–10	.	3–0	.		2–1	1–2	1–2	1–2	3–0	.	1–1	2–1	3–0	2–1	FLA	E2	6–3	3–0
UGA	11–19	2–1	.	.	1–2		1–2	.	1–2	2–1	1–2	2–1	1–2	0–3	0–3	UGA	E5	3–7	0–2
KEN	15–15	2–1	1–2	1–2	2–1	2–1		.	.	2–1	0–3	2–1	2–1	.	1–2	KEN	E4	6–4	0–1
LSU	19–11	1–2	3–0	2–1	2–1	.	.		1–2	3–0	1–2	.	3–0	1–2	2–1	LSU	W3	6–4	3–0
MSU	21–9	2–1	3–0	3–0	2–1	2–1	.	2–1		3–0	2–1	.	.	0–3	2–1	MSU	W1	9–1	3–1
MIZZ	9–21	.	2–1	2–1	0–3	1–2	1–2	0–3	0–3		.	0–3	3–0	.	0–3	MIZZ	E7	2–8	1–4
MISS	18–12	1–2	3–0	3–0	.	2–1	3–0	2–1	1–2	.		0–3	2–1	1–2	.	MISS	W4	6–4	3–1
SCAR	20–9	3–0	3–0	.	1–1	1–2	1–2	.	.	3–0	3–0		3–0	1–2	1–2	SCAR	E1	5–4	5–0
TENN	9–21	1–2	.	1–2	1–2	2–1	1–2	0–3	.	0–3	1–2	0–3		.	2–1	TENN	E6	2–8	0–3
TAMU	20–10	2–1	2–1	2–1	0–3	3–0	.	2–1	3–0	.	2–1	2–1	.		2–1	TAMU	W2	9–1	2–1
VAN	18–12	.	.	3–0	1–2	3–0	2–1	1–2	1–2	3–0	.	2–1	1–2	1–2		VAN	E3	5–5	3–0
Team	W–L	ALA	ARK	AUB	FLA	UGA	KEN	LSU	MSU	MIZZ	MISS	SCAR	TENN	TAMU	VAN	Team	Div	SR	SW

Updated for entire regular season.

== 2016 MLB draft ==
Player	Position	Round	Overall	MLB Team
J.B. Woodman	Outfielder	2	57	Toronto Blue Jays
Errol Robinson	Shortstop	6	191	Los Angeles Dodgers
Henri Lartigue	Catcher	7	197	Philadelphia Phillies
Chad Smith	Pitcher	11	323	Miami Marlins
Brady Bramlett	Pitcher	13	388	Boston Red Sox
Wyatt Short	Pitcher	13	404	Chicago Cubs

== Rankings ==
Ranking movements Legend: ██ Increase in ranking ██ Decrease in ranking — = Not ranked т = Tied with team above or below
	Week																		
Poll	Pre	1	2	3	4	5	6	7	8	9	10	11	12	13	14	15	16	17	Final
Coaches'	—	—*	—	13	10	9	11	15	11	16	12	10т	11	6	10	7			18
Baseball America	24	21	13	13	12	7	13	14	8	15	9	7	6	6	10	6			18
Collegiate Baseball^	—	29	17	13	8	6	14	15	15	—	24	26	20	12	16	16	—	—	—
NCBWA†	33	28	18	15	11	9	13	14	11	15	13	11	9	6	10	7	19		21

^ Collegiate Baseball ranked 40 teams in their preseason poll, but only ranked 30 teams weekly during the season.
† NCBWA ranks 30 teams in their preseason poll, but only ranks 25 teams weekly during the season.
* A new poll was not released for this week, so for comparison purposes, the previous week's ranking is inserted in this week's slot.
