= Florida Gators baseball statistical leaders =

The Florida Gators baseball statistical leaders are individual statistical leaders of the Florida Gators baseball program in various categories, including batting average, home runs, runs batted in, runs, hits, stolen bases, ERA, and Strikeouts. Within those areas, the lists identify single-game, single-season, and career leaders. The Gators represent the University of Florida in the NCAA's Southeastern Conference.

Florida began competing in intercollegiate baseball in 1912. These lists are updated through the end of the 2025 season.

== Batting Average ==
Career (min. 200 AB)
Rk	Player	AVG	Seasons
1	Brad Wilkerson	.381	1996 1997 1998
2	Casey Smith	.372	1997 1998
3	Scott Ruskin	.367	1982 1983 1984 1985
4	Derek Nicholson	.365	1997 1998
5	Wyatt Langford	.363	2021 2022 2023
6	Jim Watkins	.362	1978 1979
7	Scott Lusader	.356	1984 1985
8	Jac Caglianone	.355	2022 2023 2024
9	Dave Falcone	.352	1980 1981
10	Chris Wiggs	.351	1994 1995

Season (min. 100 AB)
Rk	Player	AVG	Season
1	Allen Trammell	.425	1965
2	Jac Caglianone	.419	2024
3	Pat Osborn	.414	2002
4	Brad Wilkerson	.407	1996
5	Scott Ruskin	.406	1984
6	Mark Kiger	.403	2002
	Jason Dill	.403	2001
8	Matt LaPorta	.402	2007
9	Scott Lusader	.400	1985
10	Tim Olson	.3924	2000

== Home Runs ==
Career
Rk	Player	HR	Seasons
1	Jac Caglianone	75	2022 2023 2024
2	Matt LaPorta	74	2004 2005 2006 2007
3	Preston Tucker	57	2009 2010 2011 2012
4	Jud Fabian	56	2019 2020 2021 2022
5	Brad Wilkerson	55	1996 1997 1998
6	JJ Schwarz	50	2015 2016 2017 2018
7	Wyatt Langford	47	2021 2022 2023
	Mike Zunino	47	2010 2011 2012
9	Cade Kurland	43	2023 2024 2025 2026
10	Luke Heyman	41	2023 2024 2025

Season
Rk	Player	HR	Season
1	Jac Caglianone	35	2024
2	Jac Caglianone	33	2023
3	Wyatt Langford	26	2022
	Matt LaPorta	26	2005
5	Jud Fabian	24	2022
6	Ryan Shealy	23	2002
	Brad Wilkerson	23	1997
	Brad Wilkerson	23	1998
9	Wyatt Langford	21	2023
	Jonathan India	21	2018

Single Game
Rk	Player	HR	Season	Opponent
1	JJ Schwarz	4	2015	Stetson

== Runs Batted In ==
Career
Rk	Player	RBI	Seasons
1	Preston Tucker	258	2009 2010 2011 2012
2	JJ Schwarz	237	2015 2016 2017 2018
3	Brad Wilkerson	214	1996 1997 1998
4	Matt LaPorta	206	2004 2005 2006 2007
5	Ben Harrison	193	2001 2002 2003 2004
6	Jac Caglianone	189	2022 2023 2024
7	Josh Adams	188	2008 2009 2010 2011
8	Mike Zunino	175	2010 2011 2012
9	Mario Linares	174	1988 1989 1990 1991
10	Mark Ellis	164	1996 1997 1998 1999

Season
Rk	Player	RBI	Season
1	Jac Caglianone	90	2023
2	Preston Tucker	85	2009
3	Ryan Shealy	80	2002
4	Matt LaPorta	79	2005
5	Pat Osborn	76	2002
	Brad Wilkerson	76	1997
7	Tim Olson	75	2000
8	Preston Tucker	74	2011
	Dave Falcone	74	1981
	Tony Stevens	74	1979

Single Game
Rk	Player	RBI	Season	Opponent
1	Preston Tucker	11	2009	UCF

== Runs ==
Career
Rk	Player	R	Seasons
1	Mark Ellis	240	1996 1997 1998 1999
2	Brad Wilkerson	239	1996 1997 1998
3	David Eckstein	222	1994 1995 1996 1997
4	Matt den Dekker	220	2007 2008 2009 2010
5	Mark Kiger	212	2000 2001 2002
6	Preston Tucker	210	2009 2010 2011 2012
7	JJ Schwarz	201	2015 2016 2017 2018
8	Matt LaPorta	197	2004 2005 2006 2007
9	Ben Harrison	194	2001 2002 2003 2004
10	Adam Davis	187	2004 2005 2006

Season
Rk	Player	R	Season
1	Mark Kiger	90	2002
2	Brad Wilkerson	86	1998
3	David Eckstein	85	1997
4	Wyatt Langford	83	2023
5	Jac Caglianone	83	2024
6	Brad Wilkerson	82	1997
7	Mark Kiger	78	2000
	Ned Brigham	78	1989
9	Avery Barnes	76	2009
	David Eckstein	76	1996

Single Game
Rk	Player	R	Season	Opponent
1	Mario Garza	7	2002	Siena

== Hits ==
Career
Rk	Player	H	Seasons
1	Preston Tucker	341	2009 2010 2011 2012
2	Mark Ellis	319	1996 1997 1998 1999
3	JJ Schwarz	293	2015 2016 2017 2018
4	Josh Adams	287	2008 2009 2010 2011
5	David Eckstein	276	1994 1995 1996 1997
6	Jeff Corsaletti	273	2002 2003 2004 2005
7	Brad Wilkerson	266	1996 1997 1998
8	Matt den Dekker	262	2007 2008 2009 2010
	Dave Majeski	262	1989 1990 1991 1992
10	Mike Stanley	255	1982 1983 1984 1985

Season
Rk	Player	H	Season
1	Jac Caglianone	104	2024
	Mark Kiger	104	2002
	Pat Osborn	104	2002
4	Kurt Keene	103	2000
5	David Eckstein	102	1996
6	Jeff Corsaletti	100	2005
7	Ryan Shealy	99	2002
8	Mike Zunino	98	2011
	Brad Wilkerson	98	1996
10	Tim Olson	97	2000
	Casey Smith	97	1998
	Chuck Hazzard	97	1996

Single Game
Rk	Player	H	Season	Opponent
1	37 players	5	Most recent: Kyle Jones, 2026 vs. Georgia	

== Stolen Bases ==
Career
Rk	Player	SB	Seasons
1	Brian Duva	103	1991 1992 1993 1994
2	David Eckstein	93	1994 1995 1996 1997
3	Dave Majeski	75	1989 1990 1991 1992
4	Nick Belmonte	66	1976 1977
5	Matt den Dekker	65	2007 2008 2009 2010
	Jim Watkins	65	1978 1979
7	Aaron Davidson	59	2000 2001 2002
8	Mark Ellis	56	1996 1997 1998 1999
9	Adam Davis	55	2004 2005 2006
	Roger Holt	55	1975 1976 1977

Season
Rk	Player	SB	Season
1	Nick Belmonte	42	1976
2	Jim Watkins	37	1979
3	Kevin Estrada	35	2001
	David Eckstein	35	1997
5	David Eckstein	34	1996
	Brian Duva	34	1993
7	Roger Holt	32	1977
8	Aaron Davidson	30	2001
	Brian Duva	30	1994
10	Jim Watkins	28	1978
	Robert Forbes	28	1948

Single Game
Rk	Player	SB	Season	Opponent
1	Tom Moore	6	1962	Georgia

== Earned Run Average ==
Career (MIN. 100 IP)
Rk	Player	ERA	Seasons
1	Charles Anderson	1.04	1963 1964
2	Wayne Rogers	1.67	1968 1969 1970
3	Michael Byrne	1.88	2016 2017 2018
4	Glenn Pickren	2.12	1968 1969 1970
5	Jim Courier	2.16	1967 1968 1969
	Jim Biggart	2.16	1962 1963 1964
7	Steven Rodriguez	2.19	2010 2011 2012
8	Kelly Prior	2.22	1965 1966 1967
9	Burt Touchberry	2.33	1955 1956 1957
10	Logan Shore	2.41	2014 2015 2016

Season (min. 1 IP per game)
Rk	Player	ERA	Season
1	Burt Touchberry	0.81	1957
2	Charles Anderson	0.88	1964
3	Wayne Rogers	0.91	1968
4	Dan Griffin	0.92	1964
5	Shaun Anderson	0.97	2016
6	Charles Anderson	1.24	1963
7	Glen Pickren	1.29	1968
8	Taylor Lewis	1.33	2015
9	Hunter Barco	1.40	2020
10	Wes Larson	1.45	1956

== Strikeouts ==
Career
Rk	Player	K	Seasons
1	Rob Bonanno	392	1991 1992 1993 1994
2	Marc Valdes	351	1991 1992 1993
3	Alex Faedo	349	2015 2016 2017
4	John Burke	305	1990 1991 1992
5	Darren McClellan	296	1993 1994 1995
6	Brad Wilkerson	292	1996 1997 1998
7	Liam Peterson	283	2024 2025 2026
8	Brady Singer	281	2016 2017 2018
9	Tommy Mace	258	2018 2019 2020 2021
10	Brandon Neely	254	2022 2023 2024

Season
Rk	Player	K	Season
1	Alex Faedo	157	2017
2	Hurston Waldrep	156	2023
3	Rob Bonanno	148	1994
4	Brad Wilkerson	136	1998
5	John Burke	135	1991
6	Brandon Sproat	134	2023
7	Alex Faedo	133	2016
8	Brady Singer	129	2017
	Marc Valdes	129	1992
10	Darren McClellan	126	1995
	Jeff Gidcumb	126	1988

Single Game
Rk	Player	K	Season	Opponent
1	Earl Stephens	18	1947	Miami (Fla.)
