= 2016 Florida Gators baseball team =

American college baseball season

2016 Florida Gators baseball

Gainesville Regional champions Gainesville Super Regional champions

College World Series, 0–2
- Conference: Southeastern Conference

Ranking
- Coaches: No. 5
- CB: No. 7
- Record: 52–16 (19–10 SEC)
- Head coach: Kevin O'Sullivan (9th year)
- Assistant coach: Craig Bell (9th year); Brad Weitzel (9th year)
- Home stadium: Alfred A. McKethan Stadium

2016 Southeastern Conference baseball standings
	Conf.						Overall
Team	W		L		T	PCT	W		L		T	PCT
Eastern
No. 12 South Carolina ^{x}‍‍‍^{y}	20	–	9	–	0	.690	46	–	18	–	0	.719
No. 7 Florida ‍‍‍^{y}	19	–	10	–	0	.655	52	–	16	–	0	.765
No. 23 Vanderbilt ‍‍‍^{y}	18	–	12	–	0	.600	43	–	19	–	0	.694
Kentucky ‍‍‍	15	–	15	–	0	.500	32	–	25	–	0	.561
Georgia ‍‍‍	11	–	19	–	0	.367	27	–	30	–	0	.474
Tennessee ‍‍‍	9	–	21	–	0	.300	29	–	28	–	0	.509
Missouri ‍‍‍	9	–	21	–	0	.300	26	–	30	–	0	.464
Western
No. 10 Mississippi State ^{x}‍†‍‍^{y}	21	–	9	–	0	.700	44	–	18	–	1	.706
No. 9 Texas A&M ‍‍‡‍^{y}	20	–	10	–	0	.667	49	–	16	–	0	.754
No. 13 LSU ‍‍‍^{y}	19	–	11	–	0	.633	45	–	21	–	0	.682
Ole Miss ‍‍‍^{y}	18	–	12	–	0	.600	43	–	19	–	0	.694
Alabama ‍‍‍	15	–	15	–	0	.500	32	–	26	–	0	.552
Auburn ‍‍‍	8	–	22	–	0	.267	23	–	33	–	0	.411
Arkansas ‍‍‍	7	–	23	–	0	.233	26	–	29	–	0	.473
x – Division champion † – Conference champion ‡ – Tournament champion y – Invited to the NCAA tournament Rankings from Collegiate Baseball

The 2016 Florida Gators baseball team represented the University of Florida in the sport of baseball during the 2016 college baseball season. The Gators competed in the Eastern Division of the Southeastern Conference (SEC). They played their home games at Alfred A. McKethan Stadium on the university's Gainesville, Florida campus. The team was coached by Kevin O'Sullivan in his ninth season as Florida head coach. The Gators entered the season hoping to build upon their performance in the 2015 NCAA tournament, where they finished third at the 2015 College World Series after two losses to the Virginia Cavaliers.

== Roster ==
=== By player ===
2016 Florida Gators baseball team
Players
Coaches

#	Pos.	Name	B/T	Height	Weight	Year	Home town
20	INF	Pete Alonso	R/R	6 ft 2 in (1.88 m)	225 lb (102 kg)	Jr	Tampa, FL
37	RHP	Shaun Anderson	R/R	6 ft 5 in (1.96 m)	230 lb (104 kg)	Jr	Coral Springs, FL
14	LHP	Hunter Bowling	R/L	6 ft 7 in (2.01 m)	215 lb (98 kg)	Fr	Lake Worth, FL
17	RHP	Michael Byrne	R/R	6 ft 2 in (1.88 m)	205 lb (93 kg)	Fr	Orlando, FL
15	RHP	Eddy Demurias	R/R	6 ft 0 in (1.83 m)	180 lb (82 kg)	Fr	Miami, FL
3	RHP	Dane Dunning	R/R	6 ft 3 in (1.91 m)	205 lb (93 kg)	Jr	Fleming Island, FL
21	RHP	Alex Faedo	R/R	6 ft 5 in (1.96 m)	220 lb (100 kg)	So	Tampa, FL
29	C	Mike Fahrman	R/R	6 ft 0 in (1.83 m)	200 lb (91 kg)	Sr	Tampa, FL
5	INF	Dalton Guthrie	R/R	5 ft 11 in (1.8 m)	175 lb (79 kg)	So	Sarasota, FL
9	INF	Christian Hicks	S/R	6 ft 4 in (1.93 m)	210 lb (95 kg)	So	St. Augustine, FL
11	RHP	MacGregor Hines	R/R	6 ft 0 in (1.83 m)	200 lb (91 kg)	Fr	College Station, TX
26	LHP	Nick Horvath	R/L	5 ft 11 in (1.8 m)	175 lb (79 kg)	So	Jupiter, FL
6	INF	Jonathan India	R/R	6 ft 0 in (1.83 m)	195 lb (88 kg)	Fr	Coral Springs, FL
28	C	Mark Kolozsvary	R/R	5 ft 9 in (1.75 m)	190 lb (86 kg)	So	Tavares, FL
13	RHP	Jackson Kowar	R/R	6 ft 5 in (1.96 m)	180 lb (82 kg)	Fr	Charlotte, NC
66	OF	Ryan Larson	R/R	6 ft 0 in (1.83 m)	190 lb (86 kg)	Jr	Orlando, FL
8	INF	Deacon Liput	L/R	5 ft 10 in (1.78 m)	190 lb (86 kg)	Fr	Oviedo, FL
16	INF	Jason Lombardozzi	S/R	5 ft 11 in (1.8 m)	185 lb (84 kg)	Sr	Chambersburg, PA
27	OF	Nelson Maldonado	R/R	5 ft 10 in (1.78 m)	190 lb (86 kg)	Fr	Tampa, FL
30	LHP	Scott Moss	L/L	6 ft 5 in (1.96 m)	220 lb (100 kg)	So	Deltona, FL
10	LHP	A.J. Puk	L/L	6 ft 7 in (2.01 m)	230 lb (104 kg)	Jr	Cedar Rapids, IA
23	OF	Buddy Reed	S/R	6 ft 4 in (1.93 m)	210 lb (95 kg)	Jr	Finksburg, MD
12	INF	Blake Reese	S/R	5 ft 11 in (1.8 m)	180 lb (82 kg)	Fr	Tallahassee, FL
25	OF	Danny Reyes	R/R	6 ft 2 in (1.88 m)	215 lb (98 kg)	Fr	Miami Springs, FL
4	C	Mike Rivera	R/R	5 ft 10 in (1.78 m)	200 lb (91 kg)	So	Venice, FL
39	RHP	Frank Rubio	R/R	6 ft 0 in (1.83 m)	190 lb (86 kg)	Jr	Miami Shores, FL
22	C	JJ Schwarz	R/R	6 ft 2 in (1.88 m)	215 lb (98 kg)	So	Palm Beach Gardens, FL
32	RHP	Logan Shore	R/R	6 ft 2 in (1.88 m)	215 lb (98 kg)	Jr	Coon Rapids, MN
51	RHP	Brady Singer	R/R	6 ft 5 in (1.96 m)	190 lb (86 kg)	Fr	Eustis, FL
57	LHP	Kirby Snead	L/L	6 ft 0 in (1.83 m)	200 lb (91 kg)	Jr	Alachua, FL
24	OF	Jeremy Vasquez	L/L	6 ft 0 in (1.83 m)	205 lb (93 kg)	So	Palm City, FL

Head coach

7 Kevin O'Sullivan

Assistant coach(es)

33 Craig Bell
42 Brad Weitzel

Legend

- (C) Team captain
- (S) Suspended
- (I) Ineligible
- Injured
- Current redshirt

Roster

=== By position ===
2016 Florida Gators roster
Pitchers: 3 – Dane Dunning – Junior; 10 – A. J. Puk – Junior; 11 – MacGregor Hines – Freshman; 13 – Jackson Kowar - Freshman; 14 – Hunter Bowling – Freshman; 15 – Eddy Demurias – Freshman; 17 – Michael Byrne – Freshman; 21 – Alex Faedo – Sophomore; 26 – Nick Horvath – Freshman; 30 – Scott Moss – (redshirt) Sophomore; 32 – Logan Shore – Junior; 37 – Shaun Anderson – Junior; 39 – Frank Rubio – Junior; 51 – Brady Singer – Freshman; 57 – Kirby Snead – Junior	Catchers: 4 – Mike Rivera – Sophomore; 22 – JJ Schwarz – Sophomore; 28 – Mark Kolozsvary – Sophomore; 29 – Mike Fahrman – Senior; Infielders: 5 – Dalton Guthrie – Sophomore; 6 – Jonathan India – Freshman; 8 – Deacon Liput – Freshman; 9 – Christian Hicks – Sophomore; 12 – Blake Reese – Freshman; 15 – Eddy Demurias – Freshman; 16 – Jason Lombardozzi – Senior; 20 – Pete Alonso – Junior; 24 – Jeremy Vasquez – Sophomore	Outfielders: 23 – Buddy Reed – Junior; 24 – Jeremy Vasquez – Sophomore; 25 – Danny Reyes – Freshman; 26 – Nick Horvath – Freshman; 27 – Nelson Maldonado – Freshman; 66 – Ryan Larson – Junior

== Coaching staff ==
Coaching Staff
- 7 – Kevin O'Sullivan – Head coach – 9th year
- 33 – Craig Bell – Assistant coach – 9th year
- 42 – Brad Weitzel – Assistant coach – 9th year
- 31 – Lars Davis – Volunteer assistant coach – 2nd year
- Josh Adams – Student assistant coach – 1st year
- Jon Michelini – Athletic trainer – 3rd year
- Paul Chandler – Strength & conditioning coordinator – 7th year

== Schedule ==
Legend
	Florida win
	Florida loss
	Postponement
**Bold**	Florida team member

2016 Florida Gators baseball game log
Regular season
February

Date	Opponent	Rank	Stadium Site	Score	Win	Loss	Save	Attendance	Overall Record	SEC Record
February 19	Florida Gulf Coast	No. 1	McKethan Stadium; Gainesville, FL	4–2	**Shore** (1–0)	Anderson (0–1)	**Dunning** (1)	5,778	1–0	–
February 20	Florida Gulf Coast	No. 1	McKethan Stadium	8–4	**Singer** (1–0)	Koerner (0–1)	None	4,682	2–0	–
February 21	Florida Gulf Coast	No. 1	McKethan Stadium	12–3	**Faedo** (1–0)	Leon (0–1)	None	4,110	3–0	–
February 23	Eastern Michigan	No. 1	McKethan Stadium	12–4	**Dunning** (1–0)	Shul (0–1)	None	2,673	4–0	–
February 24	vs. Eastern Michigan	No. 1	Joker Marchant Stadium; Lakeland, FL	8–7	**Anderson** (1–0)	Delaplane (1–1)	None	2,692	5–0	–
February 26	at No. 6 Miami (FL); Rivalry	No. 1	Alex Rodriguez Park; Coral Gables, FL	5–0	**Shore** (2–0)	Woodrey (1–1)	None	4,147	6–0	–
February 27	at No. 6 Miami (FL); Rivalry	No. 1	Alex Rodriguez Park	3–5	Mediavilla (2–0)	**Puk** (0–1)	B. Garcia (3)	4,999	6–1	–
February 28	at No. 6 Miami (FL); Rivalry	No. 1	Alex Rodriguez Park	7–3	**Faedo** (2–0)	D. Garcia (1–1)	None	4,784	7–1	–

March

Date	Opponent	Rank	Stadium Site	Score	Win	Loss	Save	Attendance	Overall Record	SEC Record
March 1	at UCF	No. 1	Jay Bergman Field; Orlando, FL	9–5	**Horvath** (1–0)	Deramo (1–1)	**Rubio** (1)	3,831	8–1	–
March 2	UCF	No. 1	McKethan Stadium	4–0	**Kowar** (1–0)	Thompson (0–1)	None	2,937	9–1	–
March 4	Dartmouth	No. 1	McKethan Stadium	7–0	**Shore** (3–0)	Robinson (0–2)	None	2,956	10–1	–
March 5	Dartmouth	No. 1	McKethan Stadium	4–3^{12}	**Anderson** (2–0)	Danielak (0–1)	None	3,477	11–1	–
March 6	Dartmouth	No. 1	McKethan Stadium	8–6	**Faedo** (3–0)	Chatham (0–2)	**Horvath** (1)	3,359	12–1	–
March 8	at North Florida	No. 1	Harmon Stadium; Jacksonville, FL	6–2	**Snead** (1–0)	Naylor (1–2)	None	1,674	13–1	–
March 9	North Florida	No. 1	McKethan Stadium	5–4	**Kowar** (2–0)	Drury (1–1)	**Anderson** (1)	3,111	14–1	–
March 11	Harvard	No. 1	McKethan Stadium	16–5	**Shore** (4–0)	Miller (0–2)	None	3,978	15–1	–
March 12	Harvard	No. 1	McKethan Stadium	9–2	**Singer** (2–0)	Poppen (1–1)	None	4,498	16–1	–
March 12	Harvard	No. 1	McKethan Stadium	9–2	**Faedo** (4–0)	Gruener (1–1)	**Snead** (1)	2,888	17–1	–
March 15	No. 11 Florida State; Rivalry	No. 1	McKethan Stadium	6–0	**Dunning** (2–0)	Holton (0–2)	None	5,917	18–1	–
March 18	Missouri	No. 1	McKethan Stadium	4–3^{10}	**Anderson** (3–0)	Sharp (2–1)	None	5,537	19–1	1–0
March 19	Missouri	No. 1	McKethan Stadium	6–2	**Puk** (1–1)	Houck (2–2)	**Anderson** (2)	4,059	20–1	2–0
March 20	Missouri	No. 1	McKethan Stadium	7–5	**Faedo** (5–0)	Tribby (2–2)	**Anderson** (3)	3,352	21–1	3–0
March 22	No. 19 FAU	No. 1	McKethan Stadium	2–1	**Rubio** (1–0)	McKay (2–2)	**Singer** (1)	3,792	22–1	3–0
March 25	at Kentucky	No. 1	Cliff Hagan Stadium; Lexington, KY	12–5	**Shore** (5–0)	Brown (1–4)	None	2,364	23–1	4–0
March 26	at Kentucky	No. 1	Cliff Hagan Stadium	4–7	Beggs (6–0)	**Puk** (1–2)	Lewis (1)	3,071	23–2	4–1
March 27	at Kentucky	No. 1	Cliff Hagan Stadium	4–5	Hjelle (3–0)	**Dunning** (2–1)	None	2,247	23–3	4–2
March 29	vs. No. 8 Florida State; Rivalry	No. 3	Baseball Grounds; Jacksonville, FL	3–2	**Kowar** (3–0)	Carlton (4–1)	**Anderson** (4)	9,035	24–3	4–2

April

Date	Opponent	Rank	Stadium Site	Score	Win	Loss	Save	Attendance	Overall Record	SEC Record
April 1	No. 1 Texas A&M	No. 3	McKethan Stadium	7–4	**Snead** (2–0)	Ivey (2–1)	**Anderson** (5)	5,917	25–3	5–2
April 2	No. 1 Texas A&M	No. 3	McKethan Stadium	7–2	**Faedo** (6–0)	Simonds (5–1)	**Dunning** (2)	5,339	26–3	6–2
April 3	No. 1 Texas A&M	No. 3	McKethan Stadium	10–7	**Snead** (3–0)	Hendrix (0–1)	**Anderson** (6)	4,824	27–3	7–2
April 5	Jacksonville	No. 1	McKethan Stadium	7–2	**Moss** (1–0)	Arjona (2–1)	None	2,894	28–3	7–2
April 8	No. 10 Mississippi State	No. 1	McKethan Stadium	8–2	**Shore** (6–0)	Hudson (4–2)	None	3,927	29–3	8–2
April 9	No. 10 Mississippi State	No. 1	McKethan Stadium	4–10	Rigby (4–1)	**Faedo** (6–1)	None	6,244	29–4	8–3
April 10	No. 10 Mississippi State	No. 1	McKethan Stadium	1–2	Houston (2–0)	**Dunning** (2–2)	Humphreys (3)	3,720	29–5	8–4
April 12	at No. 6 Florida State; Rivalry	No. 2	Dick Howser Stadium; Tallahassee, FL	8–2	**Rubio** (2–0)	E. Voyles (0–1)	None	5,936	30–5	8–4
April 14	at Arkansas	No. 2	Baum Stadium; Fayetteville, AR	12–8	**Puk** (2–2)	Taccolini (3–2)	**Anderson** (7)	8,348	31–5	9–4
April 15	at Arkansas	No. 2	Baum Stadium	9–2	**Shore** (7–0)	McKinney (1–2)	None	9,219	32–5	10–4
April 16	at Arkansas	No. 2	Baum Stadium	8–2	**Faedo** (7–1)	Jackson (2–4)	None	9,371	33–5	11–4
April 19	Jacksonville	No. 2	McKethan Stadium	3–1	**Rubio** (3–0)	Schappell (2–2)	**Anderson** (8)	2,658	34–5	11–4
April 21	Georgia	No. 2	McKethan Stadium	1–2^{12}	Holder (1–2)	**Rubio** (3–1)	None	3,256	34–6	11–5
April 22	Georgia	No. 2	McKethan Stadium	6–0	**Shore** (8–0)	Jones (5–3)	None	4,005	35–6	12–5
April 23	Georgia	No. 2	McKethan Stadium	4–1	**Faedo** (8–1)	Tucker (3–4)	**Anderson** (9)	4,488	36–6	13–5
April 29	at No. 5 South Carolina	No. 1	Founders Park; Columbia, SC	5–4	**Dunning** (3–2)	Reagan (1–2)	**Anderson** (10)	7,948	37–6	14–5
April 30	at No. 5 South Carolina	No. 1	Founders Park	1–2	Webb (9–2)	**Snead** (3–1)	Johnson (4)	8,242	37–7	14–6

May

Date	Opponent	Rank	Stadium Site	Score	Win	Loss	Save	Attendance	Overall Record	SEC Record
May 1	at No. 5 South Carolina	No. 1	Founders Park	Cancelled (weather)						
May 3	Bethune–Cookman	No. 1	McKethan Stadium	7–1	**Moss** (2–0)	Hernandez (4–4)	None	2,692	38–7	14–6
May 6	at Tennessee	No. 1	Lindsey Nelson Stadium; Knoxville, TN	7–2	**Shore** (9–0)	Neely (1–2)	None	2,247	39–7	15–6
May 7	at Tennessee	No. 1	Lindsey Nelson Stadium	2–5	Cox (3–5)	**Singer** (2–1)	None	2,197	39–8	15–7
May 8	at Tennessee	No. 1	Lindsey Nelson Stadium	9–3	**Faedo** (9–1)	Martin (3–1)	None	2,458	40–8	16–7
May 10	South Florida	No. 1	McKethan Stadium	11–4	**Dunning** (4–2)	Bye (0–1)	None	2,881	41–8	16–7
May 13	No. 7 Vanderbilt	No. 1	McKethan Stadium	4–2	**Shore** (10–0)	Sheffield (7–4)	None	4,537	42–8	17–7
May 14	No. 7 Vanderbilt	No. 1	McKethan Stadium	0–5	Wright (7–3)	**Puk** (2–3)	None	4,783	42–9	17–8
May 15	No. 7 Vanderbilt	No. 1	McKethan Stadium	10–6	**Faedo** (10–1)	Kilichowski (0–2)	None	4,340	43–9	18–8
May 19	at No. 8 LSU	No. 1	Alex Box Stadium; Baton Rouge, LA	3–7^{^{[a]}}	Smith (2–0)	**Singer** (2–2)	Bugg (3)	10,904	43–10	18–9
May 20	at No. 8 LSU	No. 1	Alex Box Stadium	4–5	Reynolds (3–0)	**Horvath** (1–1)	Newman (6)	10,904	43–11	18–10
May 21	at No. 8 LSU	No. 1	Alex Box Stadium	6–2^{7}	**Faedo** (11–1)	Gilbert (4–3)	None	11,303	44–11	19–10
^{^[a]}The game was suspended during the third inning due to rain and continued at 11:05 a.m. on May 21 prior to the start of the game scheduled for that day.

Postseason
SEC Tournament

Date	Opponent	Rank	Stadium Site	Score	Win	Loss	Save	Attendance	Overall Record	SECT Record
May 25	No. 7 (5) LSU	No. 1 (4)	Metropolitan Stadium; Hoover, AL	3–5^{14}	Stallings (3–0)	**Dunning** (4–3)	None	13,448	44–12	0–1
May 26	(9) Alabama	No. 1 (4)	Metropolitan Stadium	5–4	**Horvath** (2–1)	Burrows (2–1)	**Anderson** (11)	5,232	45–12	1–1
May 27	No. 3 (1) Mississippi State	No. 1 (4)	Metropolitan Stadium	12–2^{7}	**Faedo** (12–1)	Sexton (7–3)	None	9,429	46–12	2–1
May 28	No. 7 (5) LSU	No. 1 (4)	Metropolitan Stadium	1–0	**Moss** (3–0)	Gilbert (4–4)	**Anderson** (12)	13,821	47–12	3–1
May 29	No. 2 (3) Texas A&M	No. 1 (4)	Metropolitan Stadium	5–12	Vinson (4–2)	**Byrne** (0–1)	None	8,352	47–13	3–2

NCAA tournament: Gainesville Regional

Date	Opponent	Rank	Stadium Site	Score	Win	Loss	Save	Attendance	Overall Record	Regional Record
June 3	(4) Bethune–Cookman	No. 2 (1)	McKethan Stadium	9–3	**Shore** (11–0)	Norris (6–4)	None	2,965	48–13	1–0
June 4	(3) Connecticut	No. 2 (1)	McKethan Stadium	6–5	**Dunning** (5–3)	Over (0–4)	**Anderson** (13)	3,027	49–13	2–0
June 5	(2) Georgia Tech	No. 2 (1)	McKethan Stadium	10–1	**Faedo** (13–1)	Pitts (3–4)	None	2,293	50–13	3–0

NCAA tournament: Gainesville Super Regional

Date	Opponent	Rank	Stadium Site	Score	Win	Loss	Save	Attendance	Overall Record	Super Reg. Record
June 11	No. 13 Florida State; Rivalry	No. 2 (1)	McKethan Stadium	0–3	Carlton (8–3)	**Faedo** (13–2)	None	5,768	50–14	0–1
June 12	No. 13 Florida State; Rivalry	No. 2 (1)	McKethan Stadium	5–0	**Shore** (12–0)	Holton (3–4)	None	5,326	51–14	1–1
June 13	No. 13 Florida State; Rivalry	No. 2 (1)	McKethan Stadium	7–0	**Dunning** (6–3)	Sands (6–7)	None	4,475	52–14	2–1

College World Series

Date	Opponent	Rank	Stadium Site	Score	Win	Loss	Save	Attendance	Overall Record	CWS Record
June 19	No. 16 Coastal Carolina	No. 2 (1)	TD Ameritrade Park; Omaha, NE	1–2	Beckwith (13–1)	**Shore** (12–1)	None	19,696	52–15	0–1
June 21	No. 11 (4) Texas Tech	No. 2 (1)	TD Ameritrade Park	2–3	Martin (10–1)	**Faedo** (13–3)	Howard (9)	16,865	52–16	0–2

Rankings from USA Today/ESPN Top 25 coaches' baseball poll. All times Eastern. Parentheses indicate tournament seedings. Retrieved from FloridaGators.com

== Record vs. conference opponents ==
Last two do not qualify for conf. tourn. Blank are not scheduled. Blue are home games, otherwise away.

2016 SEC baseball records Source: 2016 SEC baseball game results
Team	W–L	ALA	ARK	AUB	FLA	UGA	KEN	LSU	MSU	MIZZ	MISS	SCAR	TENN	TAMU	VAN	Team	Div	SR	SW
ALA	15–15		3–0	2–1	.	1–2	1–2	2–1	1–2	.	2–1	0–3	2–1	1–2	.	ALA	W5	5–5	1–1
ARK	7–23	0–3		3–0	0–3	.	2–1	0–3	0–3	1–2	0–3	0–3	.	1–2	.	ARK	W7	2–8	1–6
AUB	8–22	1–2	0–3		.	.	2–1	1–2	0–3	1–2	0–3	.	2–1	1–2	0–3	AUB	W6	2–8	0–4
FLA	19–10	.	3–0	.		2–1	1–2	1–2	1–2	3–0	.	1–1	2–1	3–0	2–1	FLA	E2	6–3	3–0
UGA	11–19	2–1	.	.	1–2		1–2	.	1–2	2–1	1–2	2–1	1–2	0–3	0–3	UGA	E5	3–7	0–2
KEN	15–15	2–1	1–2	1–2	2–1	2–1		.	.	2–1	0–3	2–1	2–1	.	1–2	KEN	E4	6–4	0–1
LSU	19–11	1–2	3–0	2–1	2–1	.	.		1–2	3–0	1–2	.	3–0	1–2	2–1	LSU	W3	6–4	3–0
MSU	21–9	2–1	3–0	3–0	2–1	2–1	.	2–1		3–0	2–1	.	.	0–3	2–1	MSU	W1	9–1	3–1
MIZZ	9–21	.	2–1	2–1	0–3	1–2	1–2	0–3	0–3		.	0–3	3–0	.	0–3	MIZZ	E7	2–8	1–4
MISS	18–12	1–2	3–0	3–0	.	2–1	3–0	2–1	1–2	.		0–3	2–1	1–2	.	MISS	W4	6–4	3–1
SCAR	20–9	3–0	3–0	.	1–1	1–2	1–2	.	.	3–0	3–0		3–0	1–2	1–2	SCAR	E1	5–4	5–0
TENN	9–21	1–2	.	1–2	1–2	2–1	1–2	0–3	.	0–3	1–2	0–3		.	2–1	TENN	E6	2–8	0–3
TAMU	20–10	2–1	2–1	2–1	0–3	3–0	.	2–1	3–0	.	2–1	2–1	.		2–1	TAMU	W2	9–1	2–1
VAN	18–12	.	.	3–0	1–2	3–0	2–1	1–2	1–2	3–0	.	2–1	1–2	1–2		VAN	E3	5–5	3–0
Team	W–L	ALA	ARK	AUB	FLA	UGA	KEN	LSU	MSU	MIZZ	MISS	SCAR	TENN	TAMU	VAN	Team	Div	SR	SW

Updated for entire regular season.

== Rankings ==
Ranking movements Legend: ██ Increase in ranking ██ Decrease in ranking ( ) = First-place votes
	Week																		
Poll	Pre	1	2	3	4	5	6	7	8	9	10	11	12	13	14	15	16	17	Final
Coaches'	1 (21)	1 (21)*	1 (21)*	1 (30)	1 (30)	1 (30)	3 (8)	1 (28)	2 (5)	2 (15)	1 (29)	1 (26)	1 (26)	1 (28)	1 (8)	2 (3)	2 (3)*	2 (3)*	5
Baseball America	1	1	1	1	1	1	2	1	3	2	1	1	1	1	4	2	2*	2	5
Collegiate Baseball^	1	1	1	1	1	1	1	1	1	3	2	1	1	1	5	2	2	1	7
NCBWA†	1	1	1	1	1	1	3	1	2	1	1	1	1	1	5	3	3	3*	6

^ Collegiate Baseball ranked 40 teams in their preseason poll, but only ranked 30 teams weekly during the season.
† NCBWA ranks 30 teams in their preseason poll, but only ranks 25 teams weekly during the season.
* A new poll was not released for this week, so for comparison purposes, the previous week's ranking is inserted in this week's slot.
