= 1996 Florida Gators baseball team =

American college baseball season

1996 Florida Gators baseball

SEC regular season co-champions East Regional champions

College World Series, 2–2
- Conference: Southeastern Conference

Ranking
- Coaches: No. 3
- CB: No. 3
- Record: 50–18 (20–10 SEC)
- Head coach: Andy Lopez (2nd year)
- Assistant coach: Gary Henderson; Steve Kling; Eric Ekdahl
- Home stadium: Alfred A. McKethan Stadium

1996 Southeastern Conference baseball standings
	Conf.				Overall
Team	W		L	PCT	W		L	PCT
Eastern Division
No. 3 Florida ^{x}‍†‍‍	20	–	10	.667	50	–	18	.735
No. 12 Tennessee ‍‍‍	18	–	12	.600	43	–	20	.683
Kentucky ‍‍‍	15	–	14	.517	35	–	24	.593
Vanderbilt ‍‍‍	14	–	16	.467	29	–	25	.537
South Carolina ‍‍‍	13	–	17	.433	25	–	28	.472
Georgia ‍‍‍	8	–	21	.276	24	–	30	.444
Western Division
No. 5 Alabama ^{x}‍†‍‡‍	20	–	10	.667	50	–	19	.725
No. 1 LSU ^{x}‍†‍‍	20	–	10	.667	52	–	15	.776
No. 27 Mississippi State ‍‍‍	17	–	13	.567	38	–	24	.613
Arkansas ‍‍‍	15	–	15	.500	39	–	20	.661
Auburn ‍‍‍	12	–	18	.400	32	–	24	.571
Ole Miss ‍‍‍	7	–	23	.233	24	–	30	.444
x – Division champion † – Conference champion ‡ – Tournament champion y – Invited to the NCAA tournament As of June 30, 1996; Rankings from Collegiate Baseball

The 1996 Florida Gators baseball team represented the University of Florida in the sport of baseball during the 1996 college baseball season. The Gators competed in Division I of the National Collegiate Athletic Association (NCAA) and the Eastern Division of the Southeastern Conference (SEC). They played their home games at Alfred A. McKethan Stadium, on the university's Gainesville, Florida campus. The team was coached by Andy Lopez, who was in his second season at Florida.

== Roster ==
1996 Florida Gators baseball team
Players
Coaches

#	Pos.	Name	B/T	Height	Weight	Year	Home town
6	OF	Ron Ackerman	R/R	6 ft 1 in (1.85 m)	186 lb (84 kg)	Fr	Orlando, FL
9	INF	Nick Alvarez	R/R	6 ft 2 in (1.88 m)	179 lb (81 kg)	So	Miami, FL
33	INF	Travis Andre	R/R	6 ft 2 in (1.88 m)	198 lb (90 kg)	Fr	Greeley, CO
31	RHP	Charles Aulet	R/R	6 ft 1 in (1.85 m)	200 lb (91 kg)	Fr	Miami, FL
27	RHP	Tommy Bond	R/R	6 ft 3 in (1.91 m)	189 lb (86 kg)	So	Ocala, FL
35	C	Eric Castaldo	R/R	6 ft 1 in (1.85 m)	180 lb (82 kg)	Sr	Altamonte Springs, FL
	OF	Chris Chism	L/L	5 ft 9 in (1.75 m)	150 lb (68 kg)	So	Columbus, MS
18	INF	David Eckstein	R/R	5 ft 9 in (1.75 m)	160 lb (73 kg)	Jr	Sanford, FL
2	INF	Mark Ellis	R/R	5 ft 11 in (1.8 m)	160 lb (73 kg)	Fr	Rapid City, SD
47	OF	Mike Floyd	R/R	6 ft 2 in (1.88 m)	180 lb (82 kg)	Fr	Brandon, FL
22	RHP	Josh Fogg	R/R	6 ft 1 in (1.85 m)	175 lb (79 kg)	Fr	Margate, FL
37	OF	Brian Haught	R/R	5 ft 10 in (1.78 m)	164 lb (74 kg)	Fr	Tampa, FL
24	INF	Chuck Hazzard	R/R	6 ft 4 in (1.93 m)	210 lb (95 kg)	So	Dallas, TX
	RHP	Greg Hillengas	R/R	6 ft 3 in (1.91 m)	190 lb (86 kg)	Jr	Seminole, FL
46	RHP	Jeff Jackson	R/R	5 ft 11 in (1.8 m)	168 lb (76 kg)	Fr	Tampa, FL
40	C	Todd Johannes	R/R	6 ft 2 in (1.88 m)	157 lb (71 kg)	Fr	Miami, FL
	LHP	John Kaufman	L/L	5 ft 10 in (1.78 m)	170 lb (77 kg)	Jr	Tampa, FL
30	RHP	Chris Knollin	R/R	6 ft 2 in (1.88 m)	201 lb (91 kg)	Fr	Melrose Park, IL
36	OF	Sean Walsh	R/R	6 ft 2 in (1.88 m)	200 lb (91 kg)	Jr	Fort Walton Beach, FL
28	C	Octavio Medina	R/R	6 ft 0 in (1.83 m)	200 lb (91 kg)	Fr	Miami, FL
38	OF	Brian Ogle	L/L	5 ft 9 in (1.75 m)	172 lb (78 kg)	Jr	Rapid City, SD
	RHP	Matt Parker	R/R	6 ft 1 in (1.85 m)	180 lb (82 kg)	Sr	Tampa, FL
	RHP	Paul Rigdon	R/R	6 ft 5 in (1.96 m)	210 lb (95 kg)	Jr	Jacksonville, FL
25	LHP	Sergio Rodriguez	L/L	6 ft 0 in (1.83 m)	180 lb (82 kg)	Fr	Miami, FL
32	OF	Shane Seroyer	R/R	6 ft 0 in (1.83 m)	183 lb (83 kg)	Fr	Neptune Beach, FL
	INF	John Tamargo	L/R	5 ft 10 in (1.78 m)	188 lb (85 kg)	Jr	Tampa, FL
12	INF	Brad Wilkerson	L/L	6 ft 0 in (1.83 m)	193 lb (88 kg)	Fr	Owensboro, KY

Head coach

Andy Lopez

Assistant coach(es)

Gary Henderson
Steve Kling
Eric Ekdahl

Legend

- (C) Team captain
- (S) Suspended
- (I) Ineligible
- Injured
- Current redshirt

Roster

== See also ==
- Florida Gators
- List of Florida Gators baseball players
