= Jeff Schwarz =

American baseball player (born 1964)

- Pitcher
- Born: May 20, 1964 (age 61); Fort Pierce, Florida, U.S.
- Batted: Right Threw: Right

Professional debut
- MLB: April 24, 1993, for the Chicago White Sox
- NPB: April 23, 1995, for the Yokohama BayStars

Last appearance
- MLB: August 6, 1994, for the California Angels
- NPB: April 30, 1995, for the Yokohama BayStars

MLB statistics
- Win–loss record: 2–2
- Earned run average: 4.17
- Strikeouts: 59

NPB statistics
- Win–loss record: 1–1
- Earned run average: 4.15
- Strikeouts: 8
- Stats at Baseball Reference

Teams
- Chicago White Sox (1993–1994); California Angels (1994); Yokohama BayStars (1995)

Jeffrey William Schwarz (born May 20, 1964) is an American former professional baseball pitcher. He played in Major League Baseball (MLB) for the Chicago White Sox and California Angels, and in Nippon Professional Baseball (NPB) for the Yokohama BayStars.

== Early life and family ==
Schwarz was born in Fort Pierce, Florida, and graduated from Fort Pierce Central High School in Fort Pierce.

Schwarz has four children, two of whom are student-athletes at the University of Florida. His daughter Taylor plays first base on the Gators' softball team that won the national title in 2015 and was a member of the class of 2016, while his son J. J., born March 28, 1996, in Palm Beach Gardens, Florida, was drafted by the Milwaukee Brewers in the 17th round in 2014, but chose not to sign. He played his first season for the Florida Gators baseball team as a catcher in 2015, and set the single-season program record for home runs by a freshman, with 18. J. J. played professionally from 2018 to 2024.

== Playing career ==
He played during two seasons at the major league level for the Chicago White Sox and California Angels. He also played one season in Nippon Professional Baseball (NPB) for the Yokohama BayStars. Schwarz was drafted by the Chicago Cubs in the 24th round of the 1982 amateur draft. Schwarz played his first professional season with their Rookie league Gulf Coast Cubs in 1982 and his last with the Atlanta Braves' Triple-A Richmond Braves in 1996.

== Coaching career ==
He is currently a pitching coach for the GCL Marlins.
