= 2006 Florida Gators baseball team =

American college baseball season

2006 Florida Gators baseball
- Conference: Southeastern Conference
- Record: 28–28 (10–20 SEC)
- Head coach: Pat McMahon (5th year)
- Assistant coach: Ross Jones (5th year); Tim Parenton (3rd year)
- Home stadium: Alfred A. McKethan Stadium

2006 Southeastern Conference baseball standings
	Conf.				Overall
Team	W		L	PCT	W		L	PCT
Eastern
No. 18 Kentucky ^{x}‍†‍‍^{y}	20	–	10	.667	44	–	17	.721
No. 7 Georgia ‍‍‍^{y}	18	–	12	.600	47	–	23	.671
Vanderbilt ‍‍‍^{y}	16	–	14	.533	38	–	27	.585
No. 12 South Carolina ‍‍‍^{y}	15	–	15	.500	41	–	25	.621
Tennessee ‍‍‍	11	–	18	.379	31	–	24	.564
Florida ‍‍‍	10	–	20	.333	28	–	28	.500
Western
No. 9 Alabama ^{x}‍†‍‍^{y}	20	–	10	.667	44	–	21	.677
No. 25 Arkansas ‍‍‍^{y}	18	–	12	.600	39	–	21	.650
No. 11 Ole Miss ‍‍‡‍^{y}	17	–	13	.567	44	–	22	.667
LSU ‍‍‍	13	–	17	.433	35	–	24	.593
Mississippi State ‍‍‍^{y}	12	–	17	.414	37	–	23	.617
Auburn ‍‍‍	9	–	21	.300	22	–	34	.393
x – Division champion † – Conference champion ‡ – Tournament champion y – Invited to the NCAA tournament As of June 30, 2006; Rankings from Collegiate Baseball

The 2006 Florida Gators baseball team represented the University of Florida in the sport of baseball during the 2006 college baseball season. The Gators competed in Division I of the National Collegiate Athletic Association (NCAA) and the Eastern Division of the Southeastern Conference (SEC). They played their home games at Alfred A. McKethan Stadium, on the university's Gainesville, Florida campus. The team was coached by Pat McMahon, who was in his fifth season at Florida.

== Roster ==
2006 Florida Gators baseball team
Players
Coaches

#	Pos.	Name	B/T	Height	Weight	Year	Home town
44	RHP	Bryan Ball	R/R	6 ft 2 in (1.88 m)	210 lb (95 kg)	Sr	Punta Gorda, FL
11	INF	Bryson Barber	L/R	6 ft 1 in (1.85 m)	225 lb (102 kg)	So	Pensacola, FL
1	INF	Avery Barnes	L/R	5 ft 11 in (1.8 m)	165 lb (75 kg)	Fr	High Springs, FL
6	OF	Stephen Barton	L/R	5 ft 10 in (1.78 m)	185 lb (84 kg)	Sr	Miami, FL
30	C	Carson Bassett	R/R	5 ft 9 in (1.75 m)	185 lb (84 kg)	Sr	Babson Park, FL
47	C	Brett Bentley	R/R	6 ft 3 in (1.91 m)	210 lb (95 kg)	Fr	Tampa, FL
39	RHP	Michael Branham	R/R	6 ft 3 in (1.91 m)	215 lb (98 kg)	So	Tampa, FL
10	INF	Daniel Brooks (injured)	R/R	5 ft 11 in (1.8 m)	210 lb (95 kg)	Sr	Tampa, FL
32	INF	David Cash	S/R	6 ft 2 in (1.88 m)	190 lb (86 kg)	Jr	Odessa, FL
9	INF	Adam Davis	S/R	5 ft 9 in (1.75 m)	185 lb (84 kg)	Jr	Fort Myers, FL
17	OF	Gavin Dickey	R/R	5 ft 11 in (1.8 m)	205 lb (93 kg)	Jr	Tallahassee, FL
25	RHP	Josh Edmondson	R/R	6 ft 1 in (1.85 m)	200 lb (91 kg)	So	LaGrange, GA
50	C	Teddy Foster	R/R	6 ft 3 in (1.91 m)	235 lb (107 kg)	Fr	Jacksonville, FL
54	RHP	Andy Gale	R/R	6 ft 6 in (1.98 m)	225 lb (102 kg)	So	Durham, NH
4	INF	Matt Gaski	L/R	5 ft 11 in (1.8 m)	185 lb (84 kg)	So	Greensboro, NC
28	RHP	Kris Gawriluk	R/R	6 ft 0 in (1.83 m)	190 lb (86 kg)	Jr	Deltona, FL
20	RHP	Nate Helms	R/R	6 ft 2 in (1.88 m)	205 lb (93 kg)	Sr	Winter Haven, FL
22	LHP	Matt Hightower	L/L	5 ft 9 in (1.75 m)	170 lb (77 kg)	Fr	Cartersville, GA
38	LHP	David Hurst	L/L	6 ft 1 in (1.85 m)	205 lb (93 kg)	Jr	Jacksonville, FL
8	C	Brian Jeroloman	L/R	6 ft 0 in (1.83 m)	190 lb (86 kg)	Jr	Wellington, FL
27	RHP	Patrick Keating	R/R	6 ft 0 in (1.83 m)	205 lb (93 kg)	Fr	Harrisburg, IL
5	OF	Jared Kubin (injured)	R/R	6 ft 2 in (1.88 m)	225 lb (102 kg)	So	Oakton, VA
33	LHP	J.K. LaCoste	R/L	6 ft 4 in (1.93 m)	195 lb (88 kg)	Fr	Jacksonville, FL
48	RHP	Jarrod Langlois	R/R	6 ft 2 in (1.88 m)	185 lb (84 kg)	Fr	Jacksonville, FL
13	INF	Matt LaPorta	R/R	6 ft 1 in (1.85 m)	215 lb (98 kg)	Jr	Port Charlotte, FL
2	OF	Brian Leclerc	L/L	5 ft 10 in (1.78 m)	185 lb (84 kg)	Jr	Clearwater, FL
14	LHP	Stephen Locke	R/L	6 ft 1 in (1.85 m)	180 lb (82 kg)	So	Tampa, FL
31	RHP	Christian Madson	R/R	6 ft 7 in (2.01 m)	230 lb (104 kg)	Sr	Valrico, FL
3	INF	Brandon McArthur	R/R	6 ft 1 in (1.85 m)	190 lb (86 kg)	So	Seffner, FL
42	RHP	Mark McClure	R/R	6 ft 8 in (2.03 m)	215 lb (98 kg)	Fr	Tampa, FL
18	C	Cody Neer	S/R	6 ft 3 in (1.91 m)	225 lb (102 kg)	Fr	Orlando, FL
35	RHP	Darren O'Day	R/R	6 ft 3 in (1.91 m)	220 lb (100 kg)	Sr	Jacksonville, FL
29	OF	Chris Petrie	L/L	5 ft 9 in (1.75 m)	200 lb (91 kg)	Jr	Jacksonville, FL
7	INF	Clayton Pisani	R/R	6 ft 0 in (1.83 m)	180 lb (82 kg)	Fr	Naples, FL
15	LHP	Steven Porter	L/L	6 ft 3 in (1.91 m)	210 lb (95 kg)	Jr	Ocoee, FL
43	OF	Austin Pride	R/R	6 ft 3 in (1.91 m)	215 lb (98 kg)	Jr	Longwood, FL
46	C	Greg Quatrino	R/R	6 ft 0 in (1.83 m)	215 lb (98 kg)	Sr	Tampa, FL
24	OF	Bo Smith	L/L	6 ft 2 in (1.88 m)	205 lb (93 kg)	Fr	Gainesville, FL
23	RHP	Chas Spottswood	R/R	6 ft 4 in (1.93 m)	190 lb (86 kg)	Fr	Key West, FL
41	OF	Seth Steinhauer	L/R	6 ft 3 in (1.91 m)	225 lb (102 kg)	Jr	Stuart, FL
45	LHP	Patrick Thompson	L/L	6 ft 2 in (1.88 m)	195 lb (88 kg)	Jr	Gainesville, FL
34	OF	Cody Wheeler	R/R	6 ft 1 in (1.85 m)	235 lb (107 kg)	So	Coral Springs, FL
49	OF	Chris Woods	L/L	5 ft 10 in (1.78 m)	175 lb (79 kg)	Sr	Gainesville, FL
16	RHP	Tommy Wynn	R/R	6 ft 3 in (1.91 m)	195 lb (88 kg)	So	Fort Lauderdale, FL

Head coach

Pat McMahon

Assistant coach(es)

Ross Jones
Tim Parenton

Legend

- (C) Team captain
- (S) Suspended
- (I) Ineligible
- Injured
- Current redshirt

Roster

== Schedule ==
2006 Florida Gators baseball game log
Regular season
February

Date	Opponent	Rank	Stadium Site	Score	Win	Loss	Save	Attendance	Overall Record	SEC Record
February 10	Cincinnati	No. 1	McKethan Stadium	10–0	Ball (1–0)	Blevins (0–1)	None	4,488	1–0	–
February 11	Cincinnati	No. 1	McKethan Stadium	10–4	Augenstein (1–0)	Rapp (0–1)	None	3,494	2–0	–
February 12	Cincinnati	No. 1	McKethan Stadium	20–4	LaCoste (1–0)	Simon (0–1)	None	3,523	3–0	–
February 15	Mercer	No. 1	McKethan Stadium	2–3	Young (1–0)	Hightower (0–1)	Urena (1)	3,735	3–1	–
February 17	at No. 18 Miami (FL); Rivalry	No. 1	Mark Light Stadium; Coral Gables, FL	2–1	Ball (2–0)	Gutierrez (3–1)	O'Day (1)	2,164	4–1	–
February 18	at No. 18 Miami (FL); Rivalry	No. 1	Mark Light Stadium	4–1	Augenstein (2–0)	Miguelez (1–1)	O'Day (2)	2,500	5–1	–
February 19	at No. 18 Miami (FL); Rivalry	No. 1	Mark Light Stadium	11-10	Edmondson (1–0)	Orta (1–1)	O'Day (3)	2,800	6–1	–
February 22	Florida A&M	No. 1	McKethan Stadium	15–5	Edmondson (2–0)	Mercer (0–2)	None	2,891	7–1	–
February 24	No. 23 Missouri	No. 1	McKethan Stadium	5–14	Scherzer (2–0)	Ball (2–1)	None	4,372	7–2	–
February 25	Ohio State	No. 1	McKethan Stadium	10–3	Augenstein (3–0)	Luebke (0–1)	None	3,940	8–2	–
February 26	Wake Forest	No. 1	McKethan Stadium	0–4	Mellies (2–0)	LaCoste (1–1)	None	3,688	8–3	–
February 28	No. 6 Florida State; Rivalry	No. 7	McKethan Stadium	4–6	Chambliss (4–0)	Gawriluk (0–1)	Tucker (2)	4,601	8–4	–

March

Date	Opponent	Rank	Stadium Site	Score	Win	Loss	Save	Attendance	Overall Record	SEC Record
March 3	Texas A&M	No. 7	McKethan Stadium	0–4	Nicholson (3–0)	Ball (2–2)	None	3,915	8–5	–
March 4	Texas A&M	No. 7	McKethan Stadium	4–1	Augenstein (4–0)	Thebeau (1–1)	None	3,781	9–5	–
March 5	Texas A&M	No. 7	McKethan Stadium	0–1	Creps (2–1)	Gawriluk (0–2)	Chambless (3)	3,018	9–6	–
March 6	Aoyama Gakuin (exh.)	No. 16	McKethan Stadium	3–6	Shun (1–0)	Helms (0–1)	None	450	–	–
March 7	UNC Greensboro	No. 16	McKethan Stadium	2–1	Spottswood (1–0)	Currin (1–2)	Edmondson (1)	3,007	10–6	–
March 8	UNC Greensboro	No. 16	McKethan Stadium	3–1	LaCoste (2–1)	McKinney (0–2)	Edmondson (2)	3,220	11–6	–
March 10	Harvard	No. 16	McKethan Stadium	12–6	Ball (3–2)	Cole (0–1)	None	3,009	12–6	–
March 11	Harvard	No. 16	McKethan Stadium	10–2	Augenstein (5–0)	Haviland (0–1)	None	3,043	13–6	–
March 12	Harvard	No. 16	McKethan Stadium	17–6	Hurst (1–0)	Castellanos (0–1)	None	2,999	14–6	–
March 14	at Central Florida	No. 15	Jay Bergman Field; Orlando, FL	10–3	O'Day (1–0)	Herold (0–3)	None	1,729	15–6	–
March 17	No. 10 Arkansas	No. 15	McKethan Stadium	6–3	Ball (4–2)	Schmidt (4–1)	O'Day (4)	3,128	16–6	1–0
March 18	No. 10 Arkansas	No. 15	McKethan Stadium	2–3	Holloway (2–0)	Augenstein (5–1)	Maday (5)	3,204	16–7	1–1
March 19	No. 10 Arkansas	No. 15	McKethan Stadium	8–7	O'Day (2–0)	McLelland (2–1)	None	3,267	17–7	2–1
March 21	Stetson	No. 9	McKethan Stadium	6–7	Nery (3–2)	Wynn (0–1)	Elsemiller (5)	3,334	17–8	–
March 24	at No. 7 South Carolina	No. 9	Sarge Frye Field; Columbia, SC	1–4	Hempy (2–1)	Ball (4–3)	Cruse (1)	3,650	17–9	2–2
March 25	at No. 7 South Carolina	No. 9	Sarge Frye Field	5–6	Cisco (3–0)	Augenstein (5–2)	Pelzer (2)	4,278	17–10	2–3
March 26	at No. 7 South Carolina	No. 9	Sarge Frye Field	4–21	Beverly (5–1)	LaCoste (2–2)	None	4,019	17–11	2–4
March 29	South Florida		McKethan Stadium	6–5	Edmondson (3–0)	Cassidy (2–1)	O'Day (5)	4,500	18–11	–
March 31	No. 17 Vanderbilt		McKethan Stadium	0–6	Price (4–2)	Ball (4–4)	None	4,048	18–12	2–5

April

Date	Opponent	Rank	Stadium Site	Score	Win	Loss	Save	Attendance	Overall Record	SEC Record
April 1	No. 17 Vanderbilt		McKethan Stadium	6–4	Augenstein (6–2)	Buschmann (3–3)	O'Day (6)	3,378	19–12	3–5
April 2	No. 17 Vanderbilt		McKethan Stadium	2–16	Crowell (4–0)	Hurst (1–1)	None	3,378	19–13	3–6
April 4	vs. North Florida		Baseball Grounds; Jacksonville, FL	5–6	Frawley (1–0)	O'Day (2–1)	None	6,210	19–14	–
April 7	at No. 25 Kentucky		Cliff Hagan Stadium; Lexington, KY	7–8	Albers (2–1)	O'Day (2–2)	None	1,781	19–15	3–7
April 8	at No. 25 Kentucky		Cliff Hagan Stadium	6–4	Augenstein (7–2)	Snipp (4–2)	None	1,536	20–15	4–7
April 9	at No. 25 Kentucky		Cliff Hagan Stadium	6–8	Dombrowsk (6–1)	Spottswood (1–1)	Baber (4)	1,668	20–16	4–8
April 11	Bethune–Cookman		McKethan Stadium	8–2	Porter (1–0)	Kyles (3–5)	None	3,241	21–16	–
April 14	at Tennessee		Lindsey Nelson Stadium; Knoxville, TN	2–4	Cobb (7–1)	Ball (4–5)	None	2,901	21–17	4–9
April 15	at Tennessee		Lindsey Nelson Stadium	1–2	Adkins (5–4)	Augenstein (7–3)	None	2,856	21–18	4–10
April 16	at Tennessee		Lindsey Nelson Stadium	15–4	Edmondson (4–0)	Lindblom (4–3)	None	1,917	22–18	5–10
April 19	at No. 6 Florida State; Rivalry		Dick Howser Stadium; Tallahassee, FL	8–3	Edmondson (5–0)	Hyde (7–1)	None	6,249	23–18	–
April 21	Auburn		McKethan Stadium	6–9	Butts (3–5)	Ball (4–6)	Greinke (5)	3,575	23–19	5–11
April 22	Auburn		McKethan Stadium	4–1	Augenstein (8–3)	Crawford (4–5)	O'Day (7)	3,652	24–19	6–11
April 23	Auburn		McKethan Stadium	4–5	Dennis (3–3)	Spottswood (1–2)	None	3,840	24–20	6–12
April 28	Georgia		McKethan Stadium	0–7	Westphal (4–0)	Ball (4–7)	None	3,275	24–21	6–13
April 29	Georgia		McKethan Stadium	3–9	Warren (6–2)	Augenstein (8–4)	None	3,358	24–22	6–14
April 30	Georgia		McKethan Stadium	6–9	Moreau (5–1)	Spottswood (1–3)	Fields (8)	3,308	24–23	6–15

May

Date	Opponent	Rank	Stadium Site	Score	Win	Loss	Save	Attendance	Overall Record	SEC Record
May 5	at Mississippi State		Dudy Noble Field; Starkville, MS	2–6	Dunn (8–4)	Augenstein (8–5)	None	6,329	24–24	6–16
May 6	at Mississippi State		Dudy Noble Field	1–8	Pigott (5–0)	Ball (4–8)	None	–	24–25	6–17
May 6	at Mississippi State		Dudy Noble Field	9–6	Porter (2–0)	Weatherford (4–2)	None	6,614	25–25	7–17
May 12	at No. 8 Alabama		Sewell–Thomas Stadium; Tuscaloosa, AL	4–3	Augenstein (9–5)	Robert (6–5)	O'Day (8)	4,994	26–25	8–17
May 13	at No. 8 Alabama		Sewell–Thomas Stadium	2–7	LeBlanc (8–0)	Ball (4–9)	None	4,657	26–26	8–18
May 14	at No. 8 Alabama		Sewell–Thomas Stadium	4–8	Hunter (8–3)	Porter (2–1)	Robertson (8)	4,381	26–27	8–19
May 18	LSU		McKethan Stadium	3–7	Dardar (6–3)	Augenstein (9–6)	Harris (3)	3,194	26–28	8–20
May 19	LSU		McKethan Stadium	8–7^{10}	O'Day (3–2)	Harris (1–2)	None	3,428	27–28	9–20
May 20	LSU		McKethan Stadium	10–5	Spottswood (2–3)	Coleman (5–5)	None	3,190	28–28	10–20

Rankings from Collegiate Baseball. All times Eastern. Retrieved from FloridaGators.com

== See also ==
- Florida Gators
- List of Florida Gators baseball players
