= Bug Holliday =

American baseball player (1867–1910)

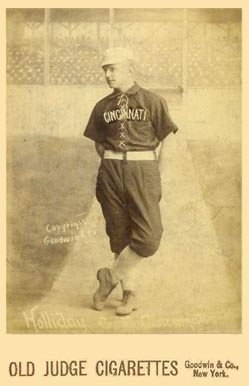
- Outfielder
- Born: February 8, 1867; St. Louis, Missouri, U.S.
- Died: February 15, 1910 (aged 43); Cincinnati, Ohio, U.S.
- Batted: Right Threw: Right

MLB debut
- October 17, 1885, for the Chicago White Stockings

Last MLB appearance
- June 30, 1898, for the Cincinnati Reds

MLB statistics
- Batting average: .312
- Home runs: 65
- Runs batted in: 621
- Stats at Baseball Reference

Teams
- Chicago White Stockings (1885); Cincinnati Red Stockings/Reds (1889–1898)

Career highlights and awards
- AA home run leader (1889); NL home run leader (1892)

James Wear "Bug" Holliday (February 8, 1867 – February 15, 1910) was an American center fielder in Major League Baseball for ten seasons, in the 1885 World Series and from 1889 through 1898. He was the first player to make his major league debut in post-season play, with the Chicago White Stockings in 1885, and he would remain the only such player until Mark Kiger in 2006. He played the rest of his career with the Cincinnati Reds, both when they were in the American Association and in the National League. He twice led the league in home runs, and was among the leaders in various other offensive categories throughout his career. After his playing career was over, he was an umpire for one season.

== Career ==
Holliday was born in St. Louis, Missouri, and became the first player in major league history to make his debut in the post-season when he was called up, at the age of 18, by the Chicago White Stockings when they needed another outfielder for Game 4 of the 1885 World Series. He played in one game, and had no hits in four at bats.

Holliday made his regular-season major league debut in 1889 for the Cincinnati Red Stockings of the American Association. In his first season with the Red Stockings, he led the league in home runs with 19, while finishing in the top ten in many offensive categories. He was fifth in batting average with .321, fifth in runs batted in (RBIs) with 104, third in hits with 181, and ninth in doubles with 28.

Before the 1890 season, the Red Stockings transferred their team over to the National League and officially became the Reds. Holliday picked up where he left off the previous season, with an opening day home run off Bill Hutchison in a 5–4 loss to the Chicago Colts. But after that, his season's power numbers dropped significantly, as he hit only four home runs, tallied 75 RBIs, and had a .270 batting average.

He bounced back the following season, when he hit nine home runs, which was fourth in the league, batted .319 to finish second in the league, and totalled 84 RBIs, which was ninth. He followed the 1891 campaign with an even better 1892 season, when he played in 153 games, batted 602 times, scored 114 runs, and tripled 16 times, all career highs. He also claimed his second home run title that season, with 13, and finished in the top ten with 176 hits as well.

Both 1893 and 1894 saw Holliday continue his batting production; although his home runs dipped to five in 1893, he still batted .310, totaled 84 RBIs, and scored 108 runs. But statistically, 1894 was his greatest season, when his .372 batting average was his career-high, as well as his 119 runs scored, 190 hits, 119 RBIs, .420 on-base percentage and .523 slugging percentage.

During the first six years of his career, he slugged 63 home runs, which was second to only Roger Connor during the same span; but in 1895 he had an appendectomy, and was never the same player after that. In his last four seasons he was never more than a part-time player.

In 930 games over 10 seasons, Holliday posted a .312 batting average (1141-for-3658) with 735 runs, 162 doubles, 72 triples, 65 home runs, 621 RBI, 252 stolen bases, 360 bases on balls, .377 on-base percentage and .449 slugging percentage. He finished his career with a .934 fielding percentage primarily as an outfielder.

== Post-career ==
When Holliday's professional baseball career was over, he played for fellow Cincinnatians Julius and Max Fleischmann on their semi-professional Mountain Athletic Club in 1899. In 1903, he was a National League umpire for the 1903 season, officiating in 53 games that season. He was involved in one incident in which Honus Wagner of the Pittsburgh Pirates and Cincinnati Reds second baseman Jack Morrissey became engaged in words, which led to Wagner being surrounded by other Reds players. Holliday ejected Wagner from the game to quell the possibility of an altercation on the field.

He continued to live in Cincinnati, and worked in a pool room while also covering horse racing for a local newspaper. He died at the age of 43 in Cincinnati of gangrene of foot and leg, and is interred at Spring Grove Cemetery, also in Cincinnati. The New York Times reported his illness on February 3, 1910. Concerned for the safety of his team, Reds manager Clark Griffith ordered all of the Cincinnati players to be vaccinated before they left for training camp.

== Personal life ==
Holliday married Mary Thurman, daughter of Ohio politician Allen G. Thurman and the former wife of William S. Cowles, in 1894.

== See also ==
- List of Major League Baseball annual home run leaders

Preceded by Long John Reilly	American Association Home Run Champion; 1889 (with Harry Stovey)	Succeeded by Count Campau
