= Roger Holt =

American baseball player (born 1956)

- Second baseman
- Born: April 8, 1956 (age 70); Daytona Beach, Florida, U.S.
- Batted: Both Threw: Right

MLB debut
- October 4, 1980, for the New York Yankees

Last MLB appearance
- October 5, 1980, for the New York Yankees

MLB statistics
- Batting average: .167
- Games played: 2
- At bats: 6
- Stats at Baseball Reference

Teams
- New York Yankees (1980)

Roger Boyd Holt (born April 8, 1956) is an American former college and professional baseball player who was a second baseman in Major League Baseball (MLB) during a single season in 1980.

Holt was born in Daytona Beach, Florida.

Holt attended the University of Florida, where he played for the Florida Gators baseball team from 1975 to 1977. He was an All-Southeastern Conference (SEC) selection and a Sporting News second-team All-American as a short stop in 1977. Memorably, he stole three bases in a single game against Ole Miss in the 1977 SEC tournament. He graduated from the University of Florida with a bachelor's degree in business administration in 1983.

The New York Yankees selected Holt in the fourth round of the 1977 Major League Baseball draft. He played second base in two career games in October 1980. He had one hit in six at bats and a walk.

== See also ==
- Florida Gators
- List of Florida Gators baseball players
- List of University of Florida alumni
