= Mark Kiger =

American baseball player (born 1980)

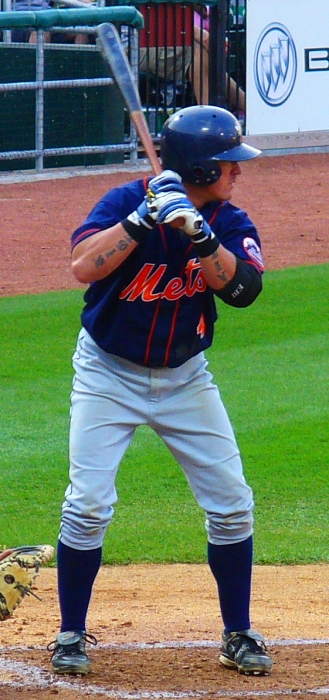
- Kiger at bat for the Binghamton Mets
- Infielder
- Born: May 30, 1980 (age 46); San Diego, California, U.S.
- Batted: Right Threw: Right

MLB debut
- October 13, 2006, for the Oakland Athletics

Last MLB appearance
- October 14, 2006, for the Oakland Athletics
- Stats at Baseball Reference

Teams
- Oakland Athletics (2006)

Mark Winston Kiger (born May 30, 1980) is an American former professional baseball infielder. Kiger made his Major League Baseball (MLB) debut in the 2006 postseason, and never played in an MLB regular season game. He is the only player in major league history to have played his entire career in the postseason, and the second of only six players to have made their major league debut in the postseason, the first being Bug Holliday in 1885.

== Amateur career ==
Kiger attended La Jolla High School in La Jolla, California. He attended Grossmont College, was drafted by the Boston Red Sox in the 27th round of the 1999 Major League Baseball draft, but did not sign. Instead, he transferred to the University of Florida, where he played for coach Andy Lopez and coach Pat McMahon's Florida Gators baseball teams from 2000 to 2002. He developed a reputation as a hitter, with a .403 batting average, 104 hits and ninety runs scored, while drawing sixty walks, in 2002. After leading the team for three consecutive seasons in scoring, his 212 runs scored remains fifth on the Gators' career records list.

== Professional career ==
The Oakland Athletics selected Kiger out of Florida as a fifth round selection in the 2002 Major League Baseball draft. Kiger was initially assigned to the Vancouver Canadians, where he hit .244/.346/.362 while moving to second base. He led Class A Short Season Northwest League second basemen in fielding percentage (.969). In 2003, Kiger hit .281/.375/.411 with the Modesto A's. He cracked 38 doubles, scored 95 runs, and drew 77 walks, while striking out 106 times. He led the Class-A Advanced California League in walks.

In 2004, Kiger batted .263/.369/.355 for the Midland RockHounds of the Class AA Texas League and walked 78 times and was 3 for 13 with three walks for the Sacramento River Cats of the Class AAA Pacific Coast League. He led the Texas League in fielding percentage at second base (.979). The next season, he was back with Midland and had an almost identical season - .267/.360/.367, 68 walks and the league-leading fielding percentage at2B (.988). Starting another year at Midland in 2006, Kiger hit .307/.379/.450 and got a longer look at Sacramento (.233/.348/.330).

With the minor league season over, Kiger was employed at his offseason job when he was contacted by the Athletics. The team had been losing infielders to injury, and needed infield help. Starting second baseman Mark Ellis broke a finger swinging at a pitch during the ninth inning of Game Two of the 2006 American League Division Series against the Minnesota Twins, prematurely ending his season. Oakland had already suffered injuries to Bobby Crosby and Antonio Perez. Two days after Ellis suffered his injury, the Athletics completed the three game sweep of the Twins, thus advancing to the ALCS against the Detroit Tigers. On October 9, the A's selected the contract of Mark Kiger off of the roster of their AA Midland affiliate, adding him to the Athletics' major league roster on the day before the start of the ALCS against Detroit.

On October 13, 2006, Kiger became the first player since Bug Holliday in 1885 to make his major league debut in a postseason game. He was brought in as a defensive replacement for D'Angelo Jiménez at second base for the Athletics in Game 3 of the 2006 American League Championship Series (ALCS). Kiger appeared twice in the series, one inning each during Games 3 and 4, both times as a defensive replacement. His only action came when he recorded a putout on a force play at second base on a grounder to the shortstop to end the bottom of the 8th in Game 3. He did not register a plate appearance in either game. The Athletics went on to lose the series to the Tigers, as Detroit advanced to the World Series, while the Athletics' season came to an end. Kiger was released by Oakland after the season.

Kiger played in the New York Mets organization in 2007, and was invited to major league spring training by the Seattle Mariners in 2008. In January 2009, he signed again with the New York Mets. He retired after the season.

As of March 26, 2026, five more players have made their major league debut in the postseason since Kiger: Adalberto Mondesi in 2015 (the only player to make his debut in the World Series); three players in 2020 after the minor league season was cancelled due to COVID-19 — Alex Kirilloff, Shane McClanahan, and Ryan Weathers; and Chase DeLauter in 2025. All subsequently appeared in the regular season. The aforementioned Bug Holliday went on to have a ten year major league career, beginning 3.5 years after his World Series cameo at age 18. As such, Kiger remains the only player in Major League Baseball history, as of 2026, to play in the postseason but never in the regular season.

== See also ==
- Florida Gators
- List of Florida Gators baseball players
