= Marc Valdes =

American baseball player (born 1971)

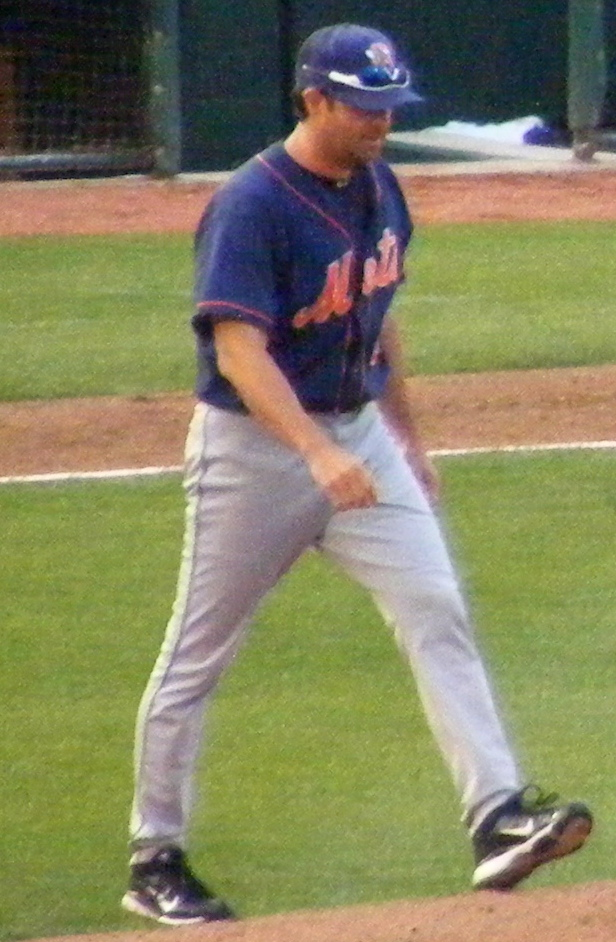
- Valdes with the Binghamton Mets in 2011
- Pitcher
- Born: December 20, 1971 (age 54); Dayton, Ohio, U.S.
- Batted: Right Threw: Right

Professional debut
- MLB: August 28, 1995, for the Florida Marlins
- NPB: March 31, 2002, for the Hanshin Tigers

Last appearance
- MLB: June 22, 2001, for the Atlanta Braves
- NPB: October 24, 2004, for the Chunichi Dragons

MLB statistics
- Win–loss record: 12–15
- Earned run average: 4.95
- Strikeouts: 135

NPB statistics
- Win–loss record: 5–7
- Earned run average: 3.15
- Strikeouts: 94
- Stats at Baseball Reference

Teams
- Florida Marlins (1995–1996); Montreal Expos (1997–1998); Houston Astros (2000); Atlanta Braves (2001); Hanshin Tigers (2002); Chunichi Dragons (2003–2004)

Marc Christopher Valdes (born December 20, 1971) is an American former professional baseball pitcher and current pitching coach for the St. Lucie Mets. He played for the Florida Marlins, Montreal Expos, Houston Astros and Atlanta Braves of Major League Baseball (MLB), and the Hanshin Tigers and Chunichi Dragons of Nippon Professional Baseball (NPB).

== Career ==
=== Amateur career ===
Valdes was born in Dayton, Ohio. He attended Jesuit High School in Tampa, Florida, and played for the Tampa Jesuit Tigers high school baseball team. He graduated in 1990.

He received an athletic scholarship to attend the University of Florida, where he played for coach Joe Arnold's Florida Gators baseball team from 1991 to 1993.

=== Playing career ===
He played all or part of six seasons from 1995-2001 for the Florida Marlins, Montreal Expos, Houston Astros, and Atlanta Braves. He also played three seasons in Japan from 2002-2004 for the Hanshin Tigers and Chunichi Dragons.

=== Coaching career ===
From 2007-2008, Valdes was the pitching coach for the Rookie-level Kingsport Mets. On February 3, 2009, he was named the pitching coach for the Single-A Savannah Sand Gnats. He was the pitching coach for the Binghamton Mets before becoming the current pitching coach for the St. Lucie Mets.

== See also ==
- Florida Gators
- List of Florida Gators baseball players
