= Tim Olson =

American baseball player (born 1978)

- Infielder
- Born: August 1, 1978 (age 47); Grand Forks, North Dakota, U.S.
- Bats: Right Throws: Right

MLB debut
- May 30, 2004, for the Arizona Diamondbacks

MLB statistics
- Batting average: .182
- Home runs: 2
- Runs batted in: 5
- Stats at Baseball Reference

Teams
- Arizona Diamondbacks (2004); Colorado Rockies (2005)

Timothy Lane Olson (born August 1, 1978) is an American former professional baseball player who was an infielder for two Major League Baseball teams in the 2000s. Olson played college baseball for the University of Florida, and thereafter, he played professionally for the Arizona Diamondbacks and Colorado Rockies.

Olson attended the University of Florida in Gainesville, Florida, where he played for coach Andy Lopez's Florida Gators baseball team in 2000. During his single season with the Gators, he had a school-record twenty-nine-game hitting streak, and received a variety of All-American honors. After the college season was over, Olson was selected by the Arizona Diamondbacks in the 2000 MLB draft.

He is married to Stephanie Leigh Buyok of Farmington, New Mexico.

== See also ==
- Florida Gators
- List of Florida Gators baseball players
