= List of Florida Gators baseball players in Major League Baseball =

This list of Florida Gators baseball players includes former members of the Florida Gators baseball team that represents the University of Florida in Gainesville, Florida, who have played in one or more regular season Major League Baseball (MLB) games. The list includes such former Gators baseball players as David Eckstein, World Series Most Valuable Player; Al Rosen, former American League Most Valuable Player; and Haywood Sullivan, former managing partner of the Boston Red Sox.

== Major League Baseball ==
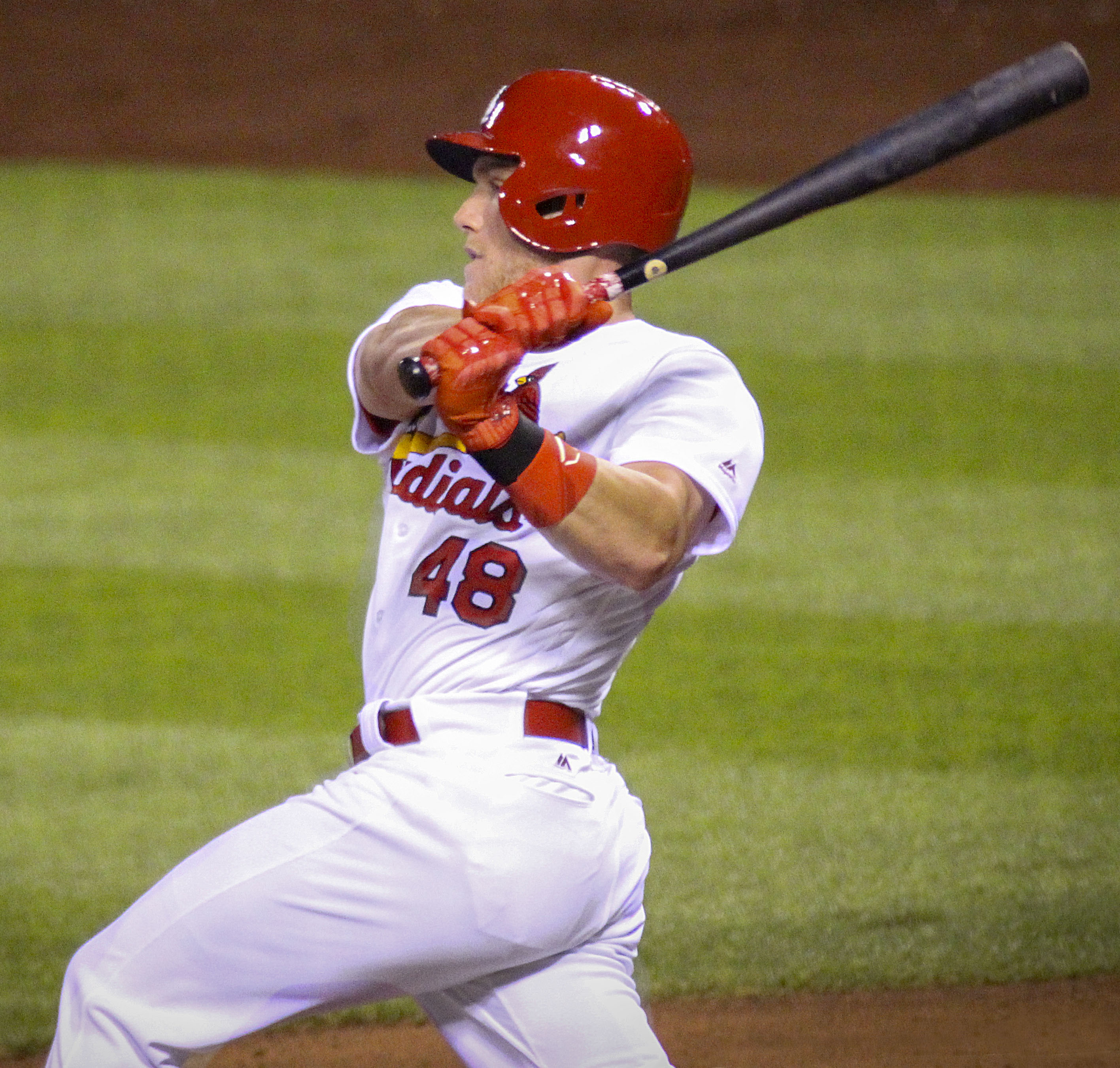
Harrison Bader

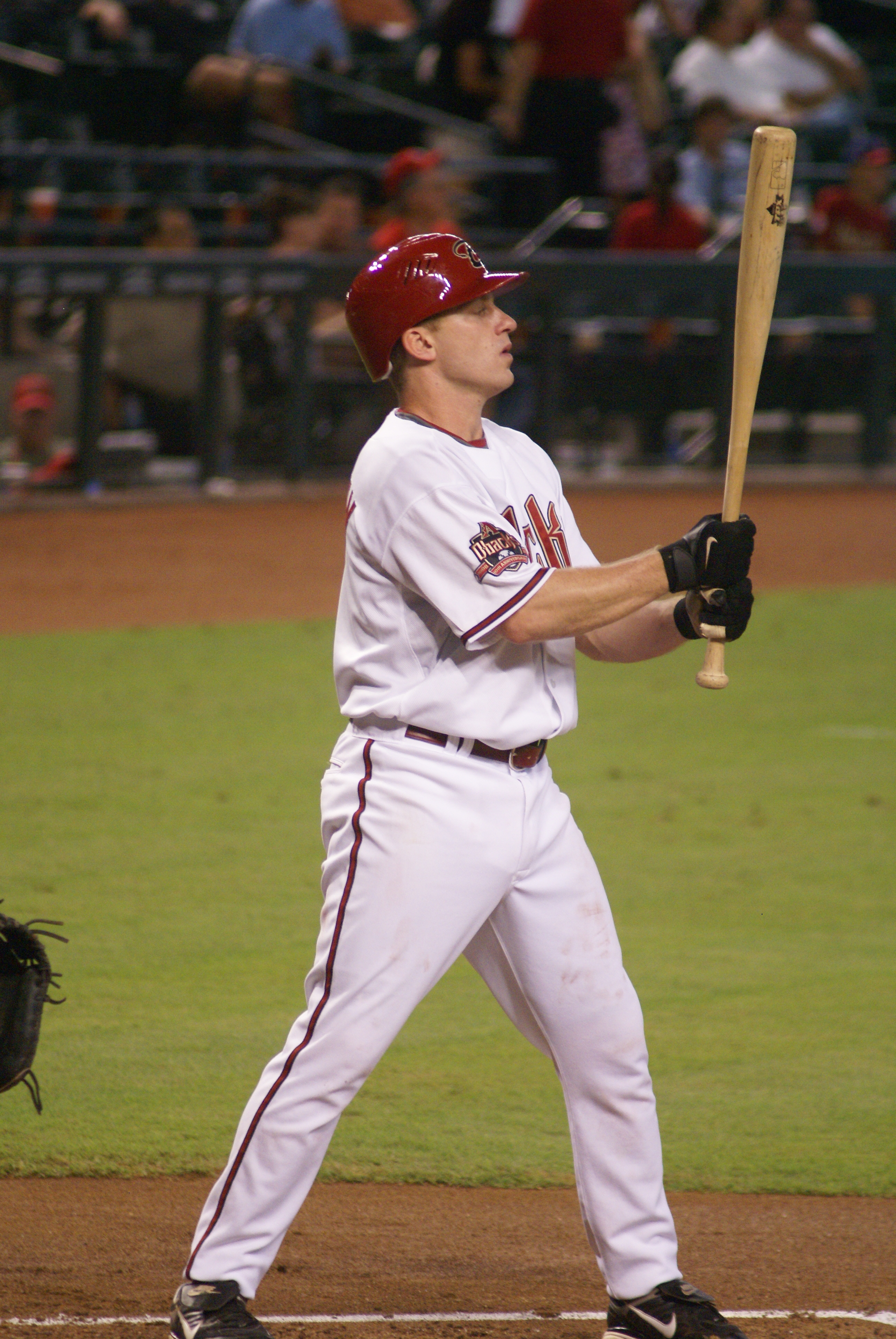
David Eckstein

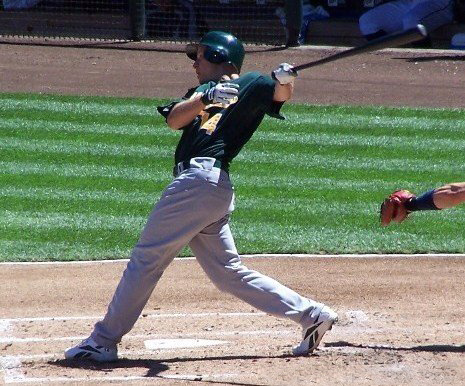
Mark Ellis

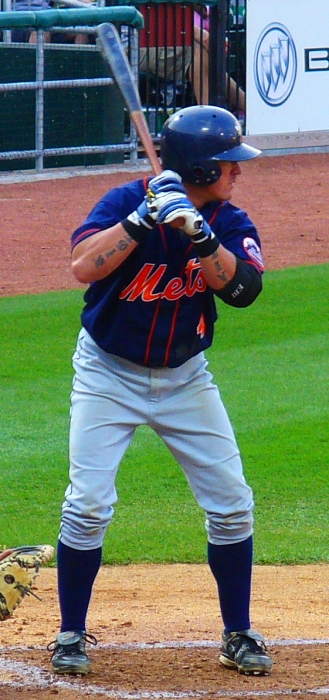
Mark Kiger

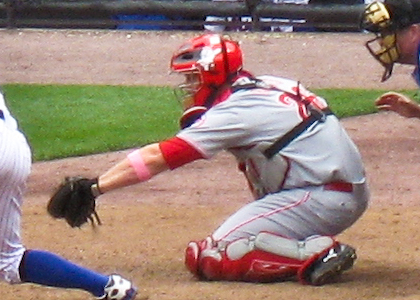
David Ross

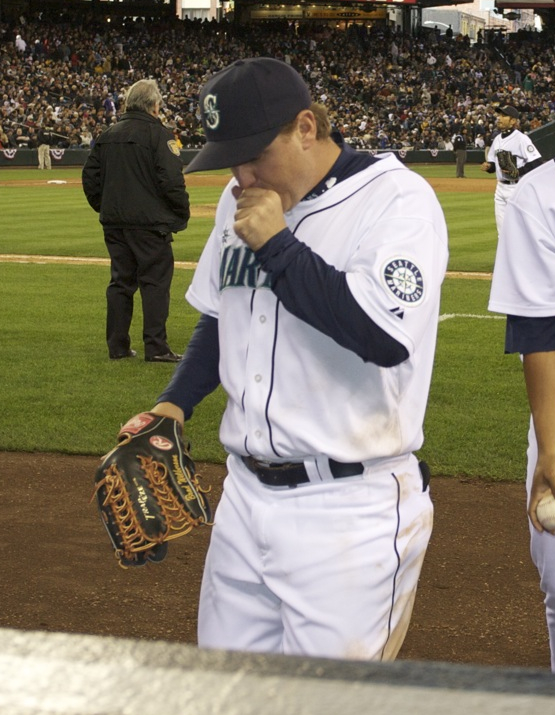
Brad Wilkerson

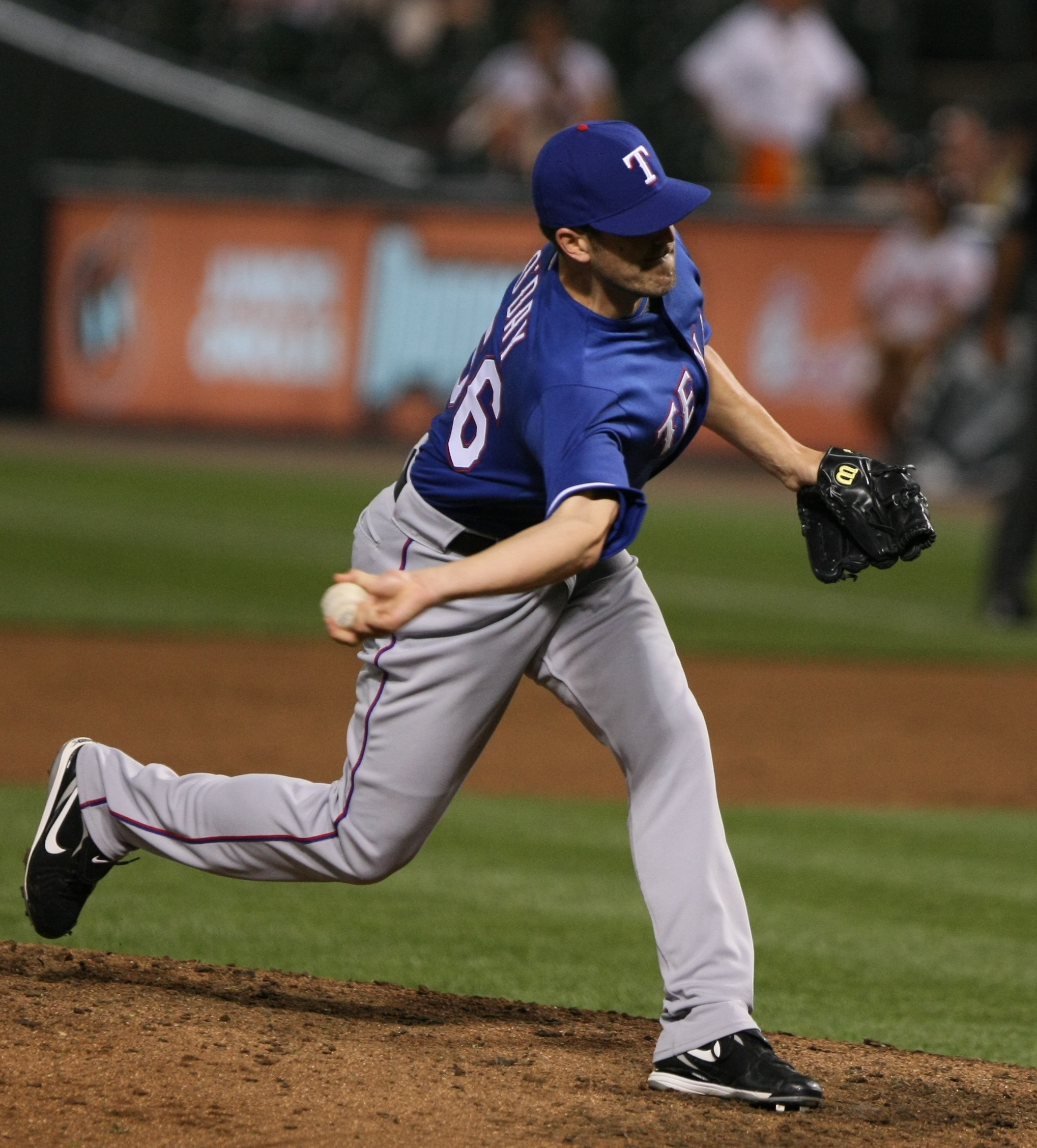
Darren O'Day

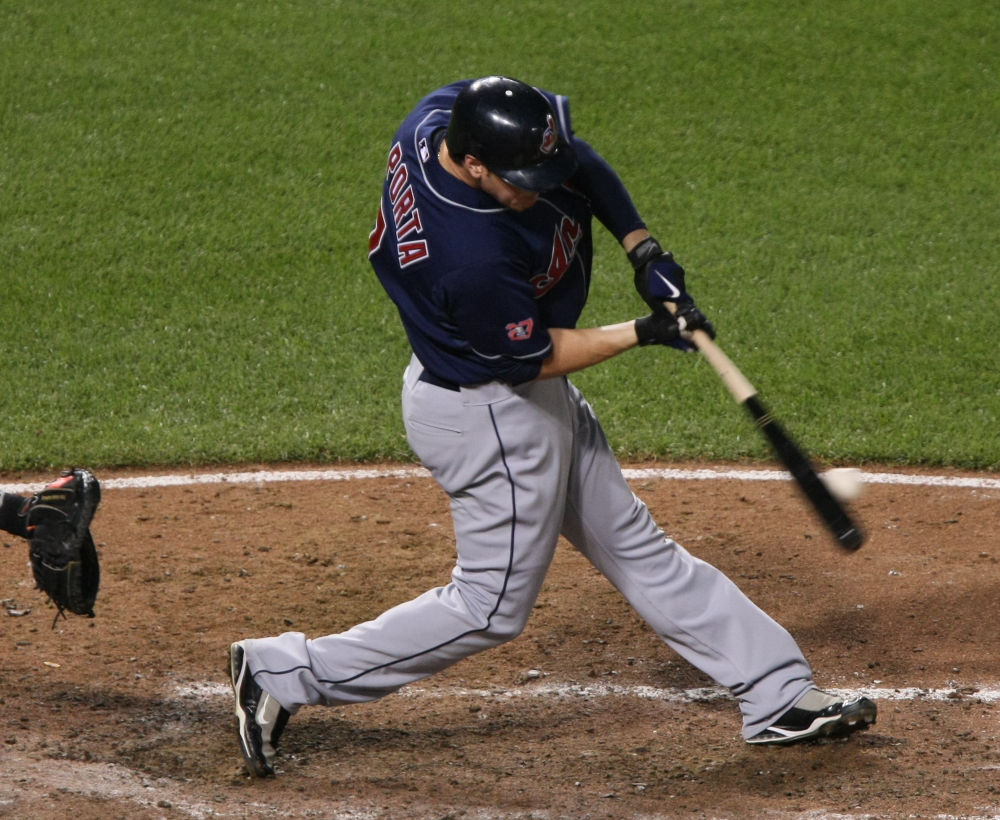
Matt LaPorta

Name	Accomplishments
Philip Abner	Pitcher for the Arizona Diamondbacks (2025–present)
Pete Alonso	First baseman for the New York Mets (2019–present), 2019 & 2021 Home Run Derby winner, 2019 NL Rookie of the Year, 5x All-Star, New York Mets' all-time leader in home runs
Shaun Anderson	Pitcher for the San Francisco Giants (2019–2020), Minnesota Twins (2021), Baltimore Orioles (2021), San Diego Padres (2021), Toronto Blue Jays (2022), Texas Rangers (2024), Miami Marlins (2024), and Los Angeles Angels (2025–present)
Bryan Augenstein	Pitcher for the Arizona Diamondbacks (2009) and St. Louis Cardinals (2011)
Dennis Aust	Pitcher for the St. Louis Cardinals (1965–1966)
Harrison Bader	Center fielder for the St. Louis Cardinals (2017–22), New York Yankees (2022–23), Cincinnati Reds (2023), New York Mets (2024), Minnesota Twins (2025), and the Philadelphia Phillies (2025–present), 2021 Gold Glove Award winner
Hunter Barco	Pitcher for the Pittsburgh Pirates (2025–present)
Ross Baumgarten	Pitcher for the Chicago White Sox (1978–1981) and Pittsburgh Pirates (1982)
Henry Boney	Pitcher for the New York Giants (1927)
Rod Brewer	First baseman and outfielder for the St. Louis Cardinals (1990–1993)
Randy Brown*	Catcher for the California Angels (1969–1970)
John Burke	Pitcher and first-ever draft choice for the Colorado Rockies (1996–1997)
Johnny Burnett	Infielder for the Cleveland Indians (1927–1934) and St. Louis Browns (1935), set an MLB record with nine hits in a single game
Jac Caglianone	Right fielder and first baseman for the Kansas City Royals (2025–present)
Tiny Chaplin	Pitcher for the New York Giants (1928, 1930–1931) and Boston Bees (1936)
Kevin Chapman	Pitcher for the Houston Astros (2013–2016)
Doug Corbett	Pitcher for the Minnesota Twins (1980–1982), California Angels (1982–1986) and Baltimore Orioles (1987)
Matt den Dekker	Outfielder for the New York Mets (2013–2014, 2018), Washington Nationals (2015–2016) and Detroit Tigers (2017)
Anthony DeSclafani	Pitcher for the Miami Marlins (2014), Cincinnati Reds (2015–2020), San Francisco Giants (2021–2023), and Arizona Diamondbacks (2025)
Robert Dodd	Pitcher for the Philadelphia Phillies (1998)
Dane Dunning	Pitcher for the Chicago White Sox (2020), Texas Rangers (2021–2025), and Atlanta Braves (2025–present)
David Eckstein	Shortstop and second baseman for the Anaheim Angels (2001–2004), St. Louis Cardinals (2005–2007), Toronto Blue Jays (2008), Arizona Diamondbacks (2008) and San Diego Padres (2009–2010), World Series champion (2002, 2006), World Series Most Valuable Player (2006), All-Star (2005, 2006)
Dave Eiland	Pitcher for the New York Yankees (1988–1991, 1995), San Diego Padres (1992–1993) and Tampa Bay Devil Rays (1998–2000), pitching coach for the New York Yankees (2008–2010), Kansas City Royals (2011–2017), and New York Mets (2018–2019)
Mark Ellis	Second baseman for the Oakland Athletics (2002–2011), Colorado Rockies (2011), Los Angeles Dodgers (2012–2013), and St. Louis Cardinals (2014)
Alex Faedo	Pitcher for the Detroit Tigers (2022–2024)
Bill Ferrazzi	Pitcher for the Philadelphia Athletics (1935)
Cole Figueroa	Second baseman for the Tampa Bay Rays (2014), New York Yankees (2015), and Pittsburgh Pirates (2016)
Jeff Fischer	Pitcher for the Montreal Expos (1987) and Los Angeles Dodgers (1989)
Josh Fogg	Pitcher for the Chicago White Sox (2001), Pittsburgh Pirates (2002–2005), Colorado Rockies (2006–2007, 2009), and Cincinnati Reds (2008)
Nolan Fontana	Second baseman for the Los Angeles Angels (2017–2018)
Colton Gordon*	Pitcher for the Milwaukee Brewers (2025–present)
Bill Graham	Pitcher for the Detroit Tigers (1966) and New York Mets (1967)
Lefty Guise	Pitcher for the Cincinnati Reds (1940)
Taylor Gushue	First baseman and catcher for the Chicago Cubs (2021)
Dalton Guthrie	Utility player for the Philadelphia Phillies (2022–2023)
Eric Hanhold	Pitcher for the New York Mets (2018) and Baltimore Orioles (2021)
Roger Holt	Second baseman for the New York Yankees (1980)
Jonathan India	Second baseman for the Cincinnati Reds (2021–2024) and Kansas City Royals (2025–present), 2021 NL Rookie of the Year
Brian Johnson	Pitcher for the Boston Red Sox (2015–2019)
Mark Kiger	Infielder for the Oakland Athletics (2006), only player in major league history to have played his entire career in the postseason, never making a regular season appearance
Mark Kolozsvary	Catcher for the Cincinnati Reds (2022) and Baltimore Orioles (2023)
Jackson Kowar	Pitcher for the Kansas City Royals (2021–2023) and Seattle Mariners (2025–present)
Wyatt Langford	Outfielder for the Texas Rangers (2024–present)
Matt LaPorta	Left fielder for the Cleveland Indians (2009–2012), Olympic bronze medalist (2008)
Steve Lombardozzi	Second baseman for the Minnesota Twins (1985–1988) and Houston Astros (1989–1990), World Series champion (1987)
Scott Lusader	Outfielder for the Detroit Tigers (1987–1990) and New York Yankees (1991)
Austin Maddox	Pitcher for the Boston Red Sox (2017)
Nick Maronde	Pitcher for the Los Angeles Angels (2012–2014)
Richie Martin	Infielder for the Baltimore Orioles (2019–2022)
Jamie McAndrew	Pitcher for the Milwaukee Brewers (1995, 1997)
Rob Murphy	Pitcher for the Cincinnati Reds (1985–1988), Boston Red Sox (1989–1990), Seattle Mariners (1991), Houston Astros (1992), St. Louis Cardinals (1993–1994), New York Yankees (1994), Los Angeles Dodgers (1995) and Florida Marlins (1995)
Darren O'Day	Pitcher for the Los Angeles Angels (2008), New York Mets (2009), Texas Rangers (2009–2011), Baltimore Orioles (2012–2018), Atlanta Braves (2019–2020, 2022), and New York Yankees (2021), 2015 All-Star
Tim Olson	Infielder for the Arizona Diamondbacks (2004) and Colorado Rockies (2005)
Randy O'Neal	Pitcher for the Detroit Tigers (1984–86), Atlanta Braves (1987), St.Louis Cardinals (1987–88), Philadelphia Phillies (1989), and San Francisco Giants (1990)
Javier Ortiz	Outfielder for the Houston Astros (1990–1991)
Mike Pérez	Pitcher for the St. Louis Cardinals (1990–1994), Chicago Cubs (1995–1996), and Kansas City Royals (1997)
Chan Perry	Utility player for the Cleveland Indians (2000) and Kansas City Royals (2002)
Herbert Perry	Infielder for the Cleveland Indians (1994–1996), Tampa Bay Devil Rays (1999–2000), Chicago White Sox (2000–2001) and Texas Rangers (2002–2004)
Parson Perryman*	Pitcher for the St. Louis Browns (1915)
Kevin Polcovich	Shortstop for the Pittsburgh Pirates (1997–1998)
Ned Porter	Pitcher for the New York Giants (1926–1927)
Bobby Poyner	Pitcher for the Boston Red Sox (2018–2019)
A. J. Puk	Pitcher for the Oakland Athletics (2019–2022), Miami Marlins (2023–2024), and Arizona Diamondbacks (2024–present)
Ryan Raburn*	Outfielder for the Detroit Tigers (2004, 2007–2012), Cleveland Indians (2013–2015), Colorado Rockies (2016), and Washington Nationals (2017)
Bill Ramsey	Outfielder for the Boston Braves (1945)
Lance Richbourg	Right fielder for the Philadelphia Phillies (1921), Washington Senators (1924), Boston Braves (1927–1931) and Chicago Cubs (1932)
Paul Rigdon	Pitcher for the Cleveland Indians (2000) and Milwaukee Brewers (2000–2001)
Paco Rodríguez	Pitcher for the Los Angeles Dodgers (2012–2015)
Al Rosen*	Third baseman for the Cleveland Indians (1947–1956), AL Most Valuable Player (1953), MLB All-Star (1952–1955), World Series champion (1948)
Steve Rosenberg	Pitcher for the Chicago White Sox (1988–1990) and San Diego Padres (1991)
David Ross	Catcher for the Los Angeles Dodgers (2002–2004), Pittsburgh Pirates (2005), San Diego Padres (2005), Cincinnati Reds (2006–2008), Boston Red Sox (2008, 2013–2014), Atlanta Braves (2009–2012), and Chicago Cubs (2015–2016), World Series Champion (2013, 2016); manager of the Chicago Cubs (2020–2023)
Scott Ruskin	Pitcher for the Pittsburgh Pirates (1990), Montreal Expos (1990–1991) and Cincinnati Reds (1992–1993)
Ryan Sadowski	Pitcher for the San Francisco Giants (2009)
Russ Scarritt*	Left fielder for the Boston Red Sox (1929–1931) and Philadelphia Phillies (1932)
Christian Scott	Pitcher for the New York Mets (2024)
Justin Shafer	Pitcher for the Toronto Blue Jays (2018–2019) and Miami Marlins (2020)
Ryan Shealy	First baseman for the Colorado Rockies (2005–2006), Kansas City Royals (2006–2008) and Boston Red Sox (2010)
Brady Singer	Pitcher for the Kansas City Royals (2020–2024) and Cincinnati Reds (2025–present)
Kirby Snead	Pitcher for the Toronto Blue Jays (2021), Oakland Athletics (2022–2023), and Seattle Mariners (2024)
Brandon Sproat	Pitcher for the New York Mets (2025–present)
Mike Stanley	Catcher for the Texas Rangers (1986–1991), New York Yankees (1992–1995, 1997), Boston Red Sox (1996–1997, 1998–2000), Toronto Blue Jays (1998), and Oakland Athletics (2000), 1993 Silver Slugger Award winner and 1995 MLB All-Star
Haywood Sullivan	Catcher for the Boston Red Sox (1955, 1957, 1959–1960) and Kansas City Athletics (1961–1963), manager of the Kansas City Athletics (1965), managing partner of the Boston Red Sox (1978–1993)
Marc Sullivan	Catcher for the Boston Red Sox (1982, 1984–1987)
Nick Testa	Catcher for the San Francisco Giants (1958)
Robby Thompson	Second baseman for the San Francisco Giants (1986–1996), MLB All-Star (1988, 1993), 1993 Gold Glove Award winner, 1993 Silver Slugger Award winner
Preston Tucker	Outfielder for the Houston Astros (2015–2016), Atlanta Braves (2018), Cincinnati Reds (2018)
Marc Valdes	Pitcher for the Florida Marlins (1995–1996), Montreal Expos (1997–1998), Houston Astros (2000), and Atlanta Braves (2001)
Hurston Waldrep	Pitcher for the Atlanta Braves (2024–present)
Brad Wilkerson	Outfielder and first baseman for the Montreal Expos/Washington Nationals (2001–2005), Texas Rangers (2006–2007), Seattle Mariners (2008) and Toronto Blue Jays (2008), Olympic gold medalist (2000)
Dale Willis	Pitcher for the Kansas City Athletics (1963)
Casey Wise*	Infielder for the Chicago Cubs (1957), Milwaukee Braves (1958–1959), and Detroit Tigers (1960)
Danny Young	Pitcher for the Seattle Mariners (2022), Atlanta Braves (2022–2023), and the New York Mets (2024–present)
Jacob Young	Center fielder for the Washington Nationals (2023–present)
Mike Zunino	Catcher for the Seattle Mariners (2013–2018), Tampa Bay Rays (2019–2022), and Cleveland Guardians (2023), MLB All-Star (2021)

* Attended the University of Florida, but did not play for the Florida Gators baseball team.

== See also ==
- Florida Gators
- List of University of Florida alumni
- List of University of Florida Athletic Hall of Fame members
- List of University of Florida Olympians

== Bibliography ==
- "2025 Florida Baseball Media Guide" (PDF). floridagators.com. p. 124.
- "University of Florida (Gainesville, FL) Baseball Players". Baseball Reference.
- "UNIVERSITY OF FLORIDA BASEBALL PLAYERS". Baseball Almanac.
