= Logan Shore =

American baseball player (born 1994)

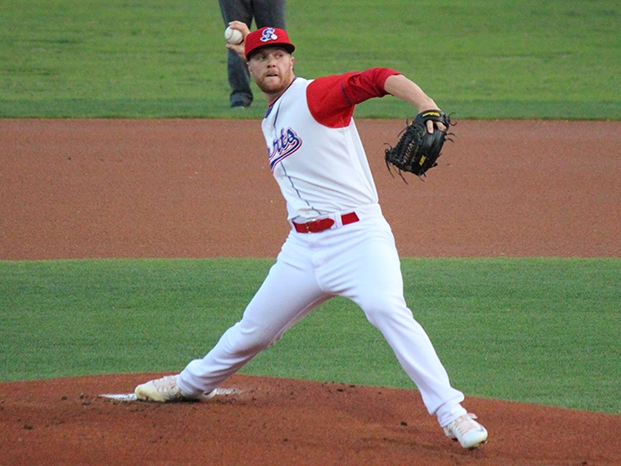
- Shore pitching for the Stockton Ports in 2017
- Pitcher
- Born: December 28, 1994 (age 30); Coon Rapids, Minnesota, U.S.
- Bats: Right Throws: Right

Career highlights and awards
- SEC Pitcher of the Year (2016)

Logan Michael Shore (born December 28, 1994) is an American former professional baseball pitcher. He played college baseball for the Florida Gators.

== Amateur career ==
Shore attended Meadow Creek Christian School in Andover, Minnesota until 9th grade, when he began attending Coon Rapids High School in Coon Rapids, Minnesota. As a senior, he was the Minnesota Gatorade Baseball Player of the Year after going 9–0 with a 0.27 earned run average (ERA) as well as a .429 batting average. During his senior season, Shore was in pre-draft talks with the Cleveland Indians who wanted to draft him in the third round of the 2013 Major League Baseball draft, but the team wasn't willing to offer enough money to Shore and instead decided to draft University of Louisville pitcher Dace Kim. Shore was ultimately taken in the 29th round by the Minnesota Twins, but ultimately chose to attend school instead of signing.

Shore enrolled at the University of Florida to play college baseball for the Florida Gators. As a freshman in 2014, Shore appeared in 16 games with 15 starts. He finished the year 7–4 with a team-low 2.16 ERA and 68 strikeouts in 95 2/3 innings. For his play he was named National Freshman of the Year by Perfect Game USA, as well as SEC Freshman of the Year, third-team All-American, and Freshman All-American. As a sophomore in 2015, Shore started 19 games as the Gators' Friday starter, finishing with an 11–6 record, 2.72 ERA, and 84 strikeouts in 112 1/3 innings. During the summer he played for the United States collegiate national team.

== Professional career ==
=== Oakland Athletics ===
The Oakland Athletics selected Shore in the second round of the 2016 Major League Baseball draft (47th overall pick). He later signed with the team for a $1.5 million bonus. He was assigned to the Vermont Lake Monsters where he posted an 0–2 record with a 2.57 ERA in seven starts.

Shore spent 2017 with the Stockton Ports. On May 15, 2017, he was placed on the 7-day disabled list due to an injured strained latissimus dorsi muscle. Shore finished the season with a 2–5 record and a 4.09 ERA in 17 games (14 starts). He spent 2018 with Stockton and the Midland RockHounds, pitching to a combined 3–6 record with a 4.45 ERA in 17 starts.

=== Detroit Tigers ===
On September 19, 2018, Shore was traded to the Detroit Tigers as the second of two players to be named later in the Mike Fiers trade. He spent the 2019 season with the Double-A Erie SeaWolves, going 4–7 with a 3.43 ERA over 23 games (16 starts), striking out 58 batters over 97 innings. Shore did not play in a game in 2020 due to the cancellation of the minor league season because of the COVID-19 pandemic.

He spent the majority of the 2021 season with the Triple-A Toledo Mud Hens, also starting 2 games for the Single-A Lakeland Flying Tigers. In 16 games (15 starts) for Toledo, Shore posted a 7–3 record and 3.95 ERA with 64 strikeouts in 73.0 innings of work. Shore began the 2022 season with Toledo. He made 25 appearances (6 starts) for the team, working to a 2–4 record and 5.68 ERA with 39 strikeouts in 52.1 innings pitched. He was released by the organization on August 24, 2022.

=== San Francisco Giants ===
On March 9, 2023, Shore signed a minor league contract with the San Francisco Giants organization. He played in only one game for the rookie–level Arizona Complex League Giants, and elected free agency following the season on November 6.

On November 21, 2023, Shore announced his retirement from professional baseball.

== Personal ==
Shore and his wife, Katie, were married in October 2019. They reside in Arizona during the off-season.
