= David Eckstein =

American baseball player (born 1975)

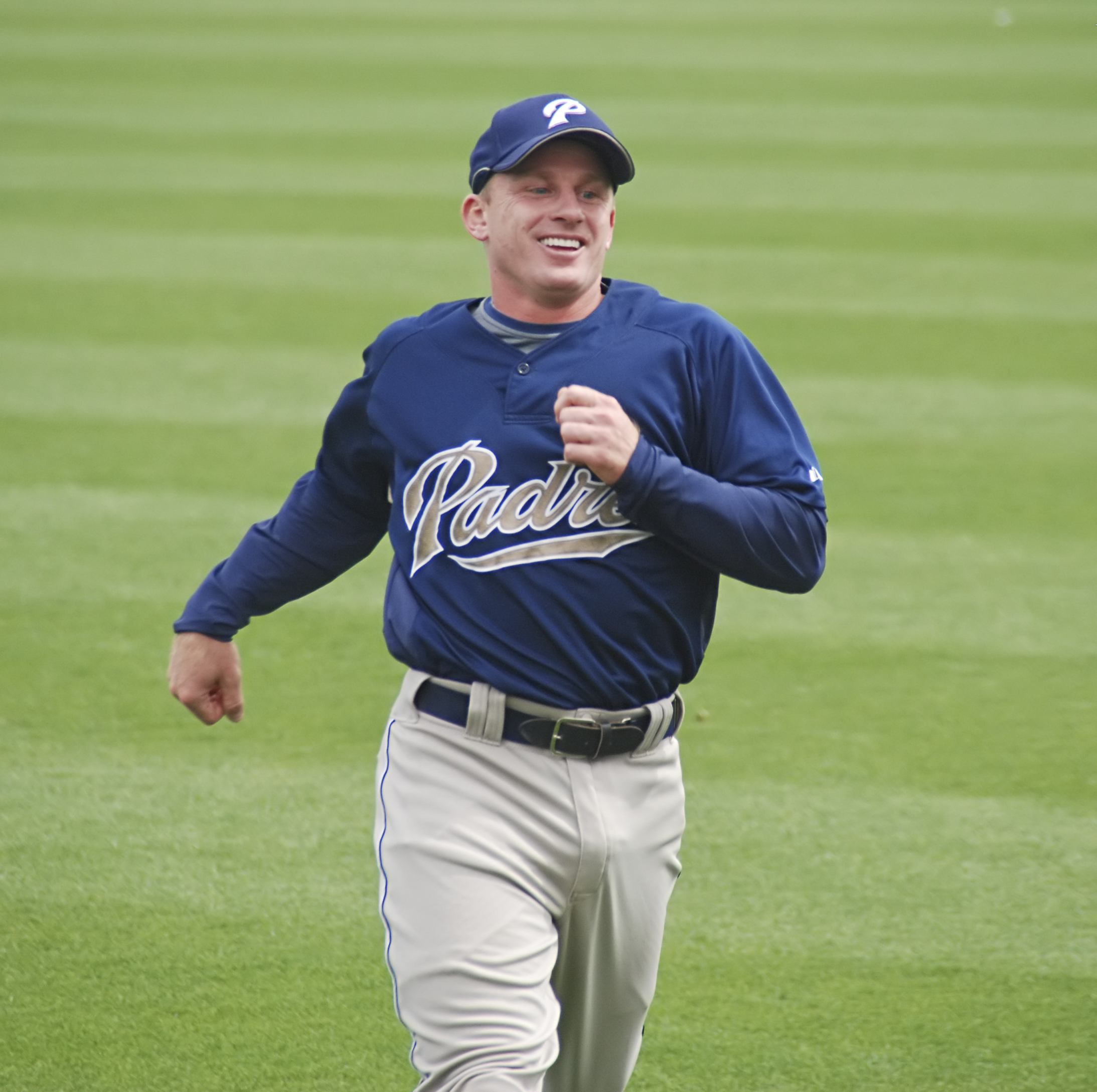
- Eckstein with the San Diego Padres in 2009
- Shortstop
- Born: January 20, 1975 (age 51); Sanford, Florida, U.S.
- Batted: Right Threw: Right

MLB debut
- April 3, 2001, for the Anaheim Angels

Last MLB appearance
- October 3, 2010, for the San Diego Padres

MLB statistics
- Batting average: .280
- Home runs: 35
- Runs batted in: 392
- Stats at Baseball Reference

Teams
- Anaheim Angels (2001–2004); St. Louis Cardinals (2005–2007); Toronto Blue Jays (2008); Arizona Diamondbacks (2008); San Diego Padres (2009–2010)

Career highlights and awards
- 2× All-Star (2005, 2006); 2× World Series champion (2002, 2006); World Series MVP (2006)

David Mark Eckstein (/ˈɛkstaɪn/; born January 20, 1975) is an American former professional baseball player. He was an infielder in Major League Baseball (MLB) for ten seasons. He played college baseball for the University of Florida and played professionally for the Anaheim Angels, St. Louis Cardinals, Toronto Blue Jays, Arizona Diamondbacks, and San Diego Padres. Eckstein won the 2006 World Series Most Valuable Player Award. After retiring from professional baseball, he briefly served as a special assistant in the Pittsburgh Pirates operations department. Eckstein stood at 5' 7" during his playing career, which made him the shortest active player for the years he played.

== Amateur career ==
=== High school ===
Eckstein played baseball all four years at Seminole High School in Sanford, Florida. He was a two-time all-state selection, and a prominent member of a state championship team. He was also a member of the National Honor Society and the Fellowship of Christian Athletes. Eckstein was voted "Most Helpful" in the Class of 1993.

In addition, Eckstein played American Legion Baseball for Post 53.

=== College ===
At the University of Florida in Gainesville, Florida, Eckstein was a walk-on player for coach Joe Arnold's Florida Gators baseball team in the fall of 1994; he later earned an athletic scholarship. A standout in the Southeastern Conference (SEC), he was a first-team All-SEC selection in 1995 and 1996, a first-team All-American in 1996, a three-time SEC Academic Honor Roll selection (1995–1997), and the first two-time Academic All-American in Gators baseball history. Eckstein was a member of the 1996 Gators squad that finished third in the College World Series. He was inducted into the University of Florida Athletic Hall of Fame as a "Gator Great" in 2007. Eckstein was a teammate at Florida with his older brother, Rick.

Eckstein also played for the Harrisonburg Turks of the Valley Baseball League in Harrisonburg, Virginia.

== Professional career ==
=== Anaheim Angels ===
Eckstein was drafted by the Boston Red Sox in the 19th round of the 1997 MLB draft, and spent 4 years in the Red Sox minor league system, reaching Triple-A during the 2000 season, before being designated for assignment by Boston on August 14. Two days later, Eckstein was selected off waivers by the Anaheim Angels. Eckstein spent the rest of the 2000 season with the Angels Triple-A affiliate, the Edmonton Trappers, where he hit .346 with 3 home runs and 8 RBIs in just 15 games.

Entering the 2001 season, Eckstein earned a spring training call-up, and eventually earning a spot on the Angels' Opening Day roster. He made his major league debut on April 3, 2001, against the Texas Rangers, where he was the starter at second base and went 1 for 3, with his first hit coming against Kenny Rogers. Through his first month in the MLB, Eckstein appeared in 28 of the Angels' 31 games, and batted .318 with 1 home run, which eventually earned him the full-time starting job at shortstop, which he held for the remainder of the season. Eckstein finished his rookie campaign with a .285 batting average with 4 home runs and 41 RBIs in 153 games. He finished fourth in American League (AL) Rookie of the Year Award voting, behind Ichiro Suzuki, C.C. Sabathia, and Alfonso Soriano.

During the Angels' 2002 championship year, he led the major leagues with three grand slams, including grand slams in back-to-back games against the Toronto Blue Jays, one of which was a game-winning grand slam leading the Angels to complete the sweep over Toronto, at a time when the Angels were 7–14. After the sweep of the Jays, the Angels went on to win 20 of their next 23 games. For the 2002 season, Eckstein hit .293 with 8 home runs and 63 RBIs in 152 games, he also led all of Major league baseball in hit by pitches (27) and sacrifice hits (14). He earned 24 votes in American League (AL) MVP voting, finishing in a tie with Nomar Garciaparra for eleventh place.

The 2003 season was a down season for Eckstein as he hit just .252 with 3 home runs and 31 RBIs as the Angels failed to qualify for the postseason and defend their title. 2004 was much of the same for Eckstein as he hit .272 with only 2 home runs and 35 RBIs, however the Angels were able to win the AL West and qualify for the postseason, where they were swept in 3 games by the Boston Red Sox in the 2004 ALDS, with Eckstein batting .333 in 12 at-bats.

=== St. Louis Cardinals ===
At the end of the 2004 season, Eckstein was part of a "shortstop merry-go-round," in which three free agent shortstops swapped teams: Édgar Rentería went from the Cardinals to the Boston Red Sox, Orlando Cabrera went from the Red Sox to the Angels, and Eckstein went from the Angels to the Cardinals. Eckstein signed a three-year, $10.25 million contract with the Cardinals on December 23, 2004.

In his first seven seasons, he amassed 1,079 hits while batting .286. He was voted to the National League All-Star team in 2005, along with teammates Chris Carpenter, Albert Pujols, Jason Isringhausen, and Jim Edmonds. He was a late addition to the 2006 All-Star team. In 3,772 regular season at-bats, Eckstein struck out only 305 times, with a total of 22 in 2007.

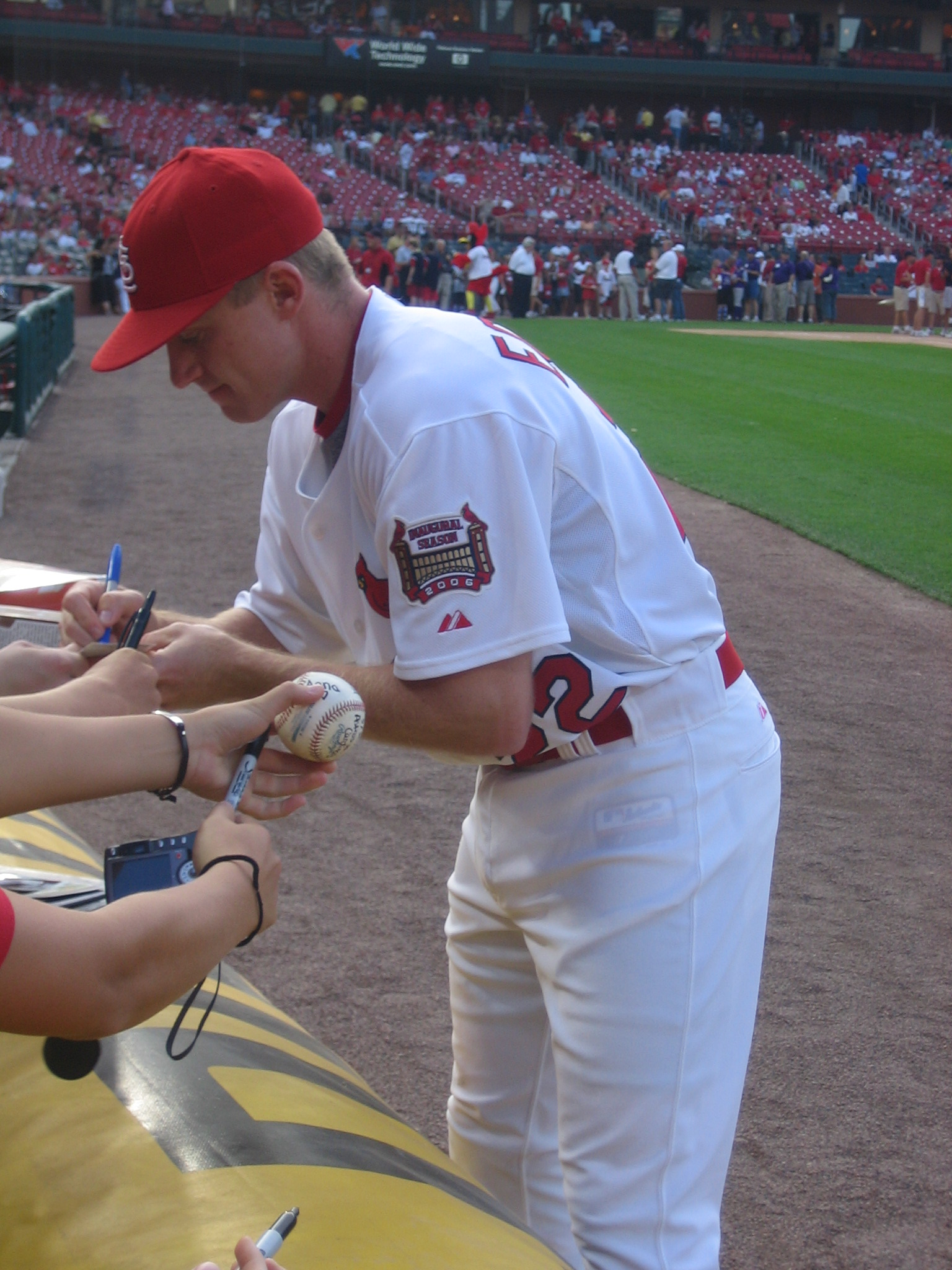
Cardinals shortstop Eckstein signs autographs before a game against the Houston Astros on May 30, 2006.

Eckstein was a fan favorite in St. Louis, who considered him to be a "pesky" hitter (he choked-up on the bat about two inches). On Mother's Day, May 14, 2006, Eckstein was one of more than 50 hitters who brandished a pink bat to benefit the Breast Cancer Foundation.

A member of the 2006 World Series champion St. Louis Cardinals, Eckstein was named the World Series MVP. Following a 0-for-11 start in the first two games of the World Series, Eckstein went 8-for-22 with four RBI and scored three runs in the series, including going 4-for-5 with three doubles in Game 4. The World Series victory with the Cardinals made Eckstein one of few starting shortstops who have won a World Series in both the American and National Leagues.

Eckstein was brought back in front of over 47,000 fans to throw out the first pitch of Game 6 of the World Series in St. Louis on October 27, 2011.

=== Toronto Blue Jays ===
On October 30, 2007, Eckstein became a free agent along with Kip Wells, Troy Percival, and Miguel Cairo. On December 13, 2007, he signed a one-year, $4.5 million contract with the Toronto Blue Jays.

=== Arizona Diamondbacks ===
On August 31, 2008, Eckstein was traded to the Arizona Diamondbacks for minor league pitcher Chad Beck.

=== San Diego Padres ===
On January 15, 2009, he signed a discounted one-year contract with the San Diego Padres on the condition that he would play primarily second base. On August 22, 2009, the San Diego Padres extended Eckstein's contract through 2010.

Eckstein did not join a team for the 2011 season. In June, it was reported that he received offers from the Padres and other teams, but opted to not play baseball. He officially retired on January 22, 2012.

=== Career statistics ===
In 1,311 games over 10 seasons, Eckstein posted a .280 batting average (1,414–5,041) with 701 runs, 232 doubles, 20 triples, 35 home runs, 392 RBI, 123 stolen bases, 376 bases on balls, .345 on-base percentage and .355 slugging percentage. He finished his career with a .982 fielding percentage playing at shortstop and second base. In 44 postseason games, he hit .278 (49–176) with 26 runs, four doubles, two home runs, 18 RBI, seven stolen bases and 12 walks.

== Post-playing career ==
Eckstein became a candidate for induction into the National Baseball Hall of Fame and Museum for the first time on November 9, 2015. He received two votes.

== Personal life ==
Eckstein, a Catholic, made an effort to attend mass every Sunday during his playing career. However, seemingly because of his name, a misconception spread early in his career that he was Jewish.

Eckstein was born in Sanford, Florida. He married actress Ashley Eckstein on November 26, 2005, at his family church in Sanford, followed by a reception at Walt Disney World. He is a fan of professional wrestling, having made public appearances with Total Nonstop Action Wrestling during the 2006 World Series and on February 11, 2007, he co-managed (along with Tampa Bay Rays outfielder Johnny Damon) TNA wrestler Lance Hoyt for his match with former White Sox conditioning coach Dale Torborg, managed by Sox catcher A. J. Pierzynski at TNA's Against All Odds pay-per-view.

After his older brother, Rick, was hired after the 2018 season as the hitting coach for the Pittsburgh Pirates, David was hired in February as a special assistant in their baseball operations department. He left the position before the 2021 season.

== Career highlights ==
- Holiday Inn Look Again Player of the Year (2006)
- 2-time World Series Champion (2002 Anaheim Angels, 2006 St. Louis Cardinals)
- World Series MVP (2006)
- 2-time All-Star (2005, 2006)
- Babe Ruth Award winner (2006)
- Inaugural winner of the Major League Baseball Players Alumni Association's Heart & Hustle Award (2005)
- Number retired by the Trenton Thunder

== See also ==
- List of Florida Gators baseball players in Major League Baseball
- List of Major League Baseball career hit by pitch leaders
- Los Angeles Angels award winners and league leaders
- St. Louis Cardinals award winners and league leaders
- University of Florida Athletic Hall of Fame

== Bibliography ==
- Eckstein, David, with Greg Brown, Have Heart, Builder's Stone Publishing, Lake Mary, Florida (2006). ISBN 0-9791504-0-X.
