= J. J. Schwarz =

American baseball player (born 1996)

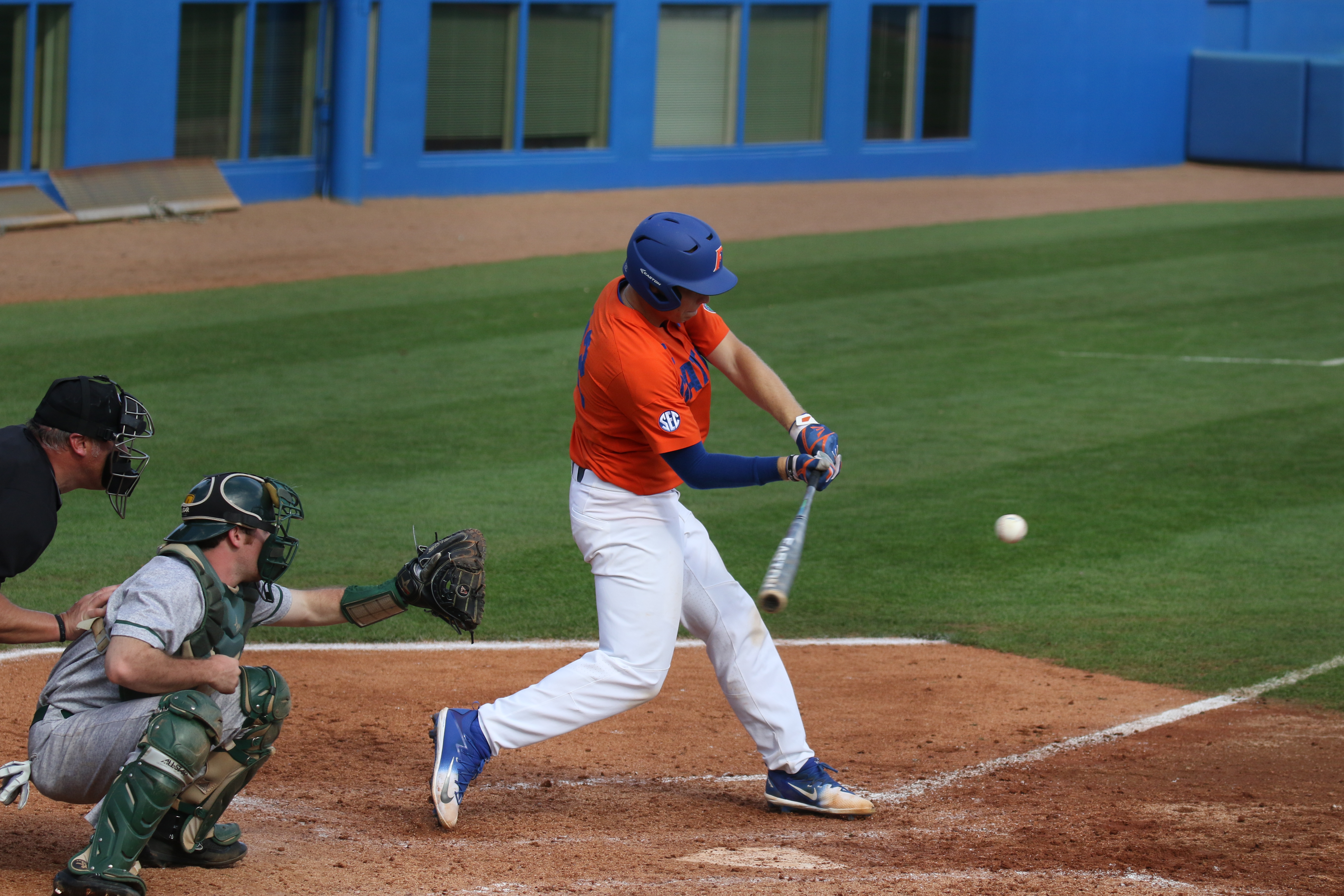
- Catcher
- Born: March 28, 1996 (age 30); Palm Beach Gardens, Florida, U.S.
- Bats: Right Throws: Right
- Stats at Baseball Reference
Medals
Men's baseball
Representing United States
18U Baseball World Cup
Gold medal – first place	2013 Taichung	Team

Jeffrey James Schwarz (born March 28, 1996) is an American former professional baseball catcher. He played college baseball for the Florida Gators.

== Amateur career ==
Schwarz attended Palm Beach Gardens Community High School in Palm Beach Gardens, Florida. As a senior, he hit .337 with seven home runs and 35 runs batted in (RBI). He was drafted by the Milwaukee Brewers in the 17th round of the 2014 MLB draft. He did not sign with the Brewers and attended the University of Florida where he played college baseball for the Florida Gators.

Schwarz started all 70 games his freshman year at Florida in 2015. In 256 at-bats he hit .332 and led the team in RBI (73), home runs (18), doubles (16), sacrifice flies (6), and slugging percentage (.629). Against Stetson University, he hit a school-record four home runs. He helped lead Florida to the College World Series, where they were eliminated by Virginia. He was named the Freshman Player of the Year by the Collegiate Baseball Newspaper and the Freshman Hitter of the Year by the National Collegiate Baseball Writers Association (NCBWA).

In 2016, as a sophomore, Schwarz batted .290 with seven home runs and 60 RBI. In 2016, he played collegiate summer baseball for the Yarmouth-Dennis Red Sox of the Cape Cod Baseball League. As a junior in 2017, he batted .259 with 12 home runs and 54 RBI. He was drafted by the Tampa Bay Rays in the 38th round of the 2017 MLB draft, but did not sign and returned to Florida. In 2018, his senior year, he was named to the All-SEC First Team.

== Professional career ==
=== Oakland Athletics ===
Schwarz was drafted by the Oakland Athletics in the eighth round, with the 223rd overall selection, of the 2018 Major League Baseball draft. He signed with Oakland on July 6 and made his professional debut with the rookie–level Arizona League Athletics before being promoted to the Low–A Vermont Lake Monsters. In 25 games between the two teams, Schwarz hit .266 with ten RBI. He began 2019 with the High–A Stockton Ports, and also spent time with the Single–A Beloit Snappers. Playing only 44 games between both clubs due to injury, he batted .148/.239/.225 in 142 at bats with three home runs and 14 RBI.

Schwarz did not play in a game in 2020 due to the cancellation of the minor league season because of the COVID-19 pandemic. In 2021, playing for Midland he batted .240/.336/.362 with six home runs and 36 RBI across 72 games. Playing in 2022 for Midland and the Triple–A Las Vegas Aviators, Schwarz batted .294/.383/.453 with nine home runs and 43 RBI across 80 combined contests.

Schwarz split the 2023 campaign with Midland and Las Vegas, accumulating a .220/.319/.351 with eight home runs and 39 RBI across 76 combined appearances. He was released by the Athletics organization on March 25, 2024.

=== Gastonia Baseball Club ===
On July 16, 2024, Schwarz signed with the Gastonia Baseball Club of the Atlantic League of Professional Baseball. In 21 games for Gastonia, he slashed .197/.279/.329 with two home runs and 13 RBI. On August 20, Schwarz retired from professional baseball.

== Coaching career ==
Schwarz signed with Athletes Untapped as a private baseball coach on May 21, 2024.

== Personal ==
Schwarz's father, Jeff Schwarz, played in Major League Baseball, and his sister, Taylor Schwarz, played softball at Florida.
