= Brady Singer =

American baseball player (born 1996)

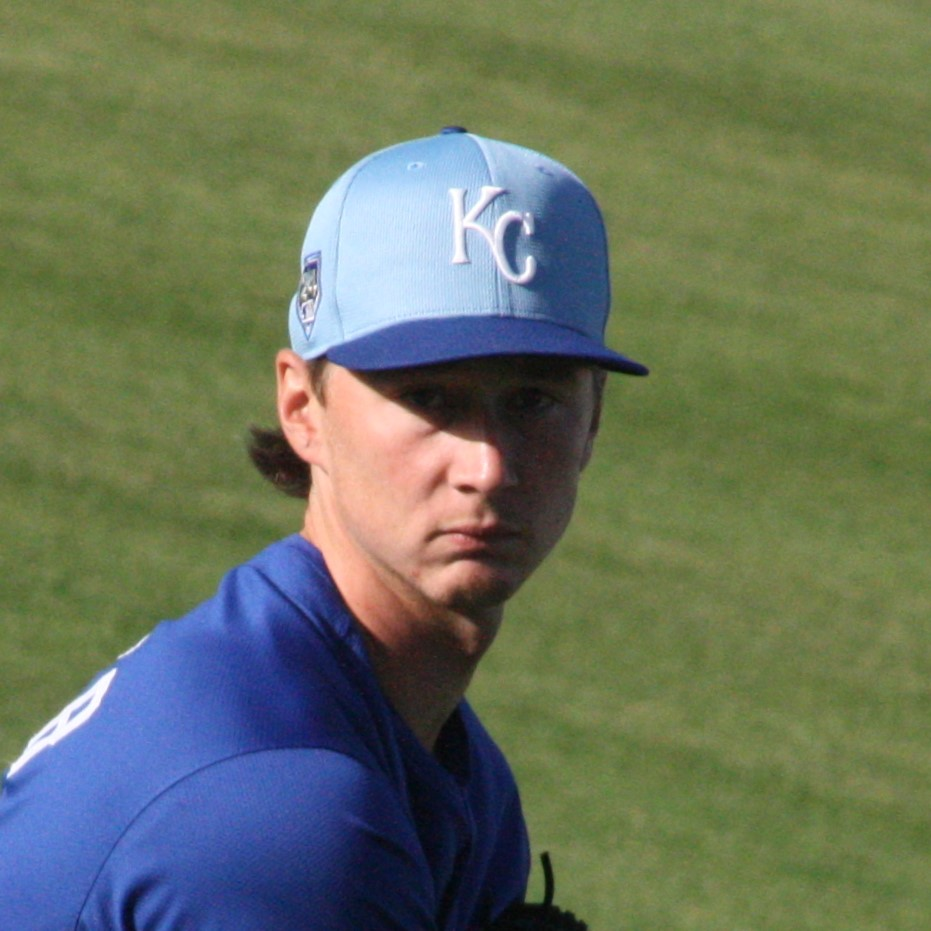
- Singer with the Royals in 2024

Free agent
- Pitcher
- Born: August 4, 1996 (age 30); Leesburg, Florida, U.S.
- Bats: Right Throws: Right

MLB debut
- July 25, 2020, for the Kansas City Royals

MLB statistics (through 2026 season)
- Win–loss record: 56–71
- Earned run average: 4.48
- Strikeouts: 934
- Stats at Baseball Reference

Teams
- Kansas City Royals (2020–2024); Cincinnati Reds (2025–2026)

Career highlights and awards
- Dick Howser Trophy (2018)
Medals
Men's baseball
Representing United States
World Baseball Classic
Silver medal – second place	2023 Miami	Team

Brady Alan Singer (born August 4, 1996) is an American professional baseball pitcher who is a free agent. He has played in Major League Baseball (MLB) for the Kansas City Royals and Cincinnati Reds.

Singer played college baseball for the Florida Gators, and won the Dick Howser Trophy and Baseball America's College Player of the Year Award. He was selected by the Royals in the first round of the 2018 MLB draft, and made his MLB debut in 2020. The Royals traded Singer to the Reds after the 2024 season.

== Amateur career ==
Singer first attended Tavares High School in Tavares, Florida, helping the 2012 team win its first district championship in 24 years. Singer later transferred to nearby Eustis High School in Eustis, Florida, where as a senior he went 8–3 with a 1.25 earned run average (ERA) and 110 strikeouts in 67 innings. The Toronto Blue Jays drafted Singer in the second round of the 2015 Major League Baseball draft, but he did not sign with the team.

Singer attended the University of Florida where he played college baseball. As a freshman for the Gators in 2016, he appeared in 23 games, making one start. He finished the season 2–2 with a 4.95 ERA and 38 strikeouts in 43 2/3 innings. After the season, he played summer baseball for the Falmouth Commodores of the Cape Cod Baseball League, where he was named the league's best prospect by Baseball America. Singer moved into Florida's starting rotation as a sophomore in 2017. He was named to the All-SEC Second Team. He helped lead Florida to the College World Series finals against the LSU Tigers. He started in game 1, striking out 12 batters to lead the Gators to a 4–3 win. Florida later won the national title, and Singer was named to the All-Tournament Team. In 126 innings for the season, Singer was 9–5 with a 3.21 ERA, striking out 129 and walking 32.

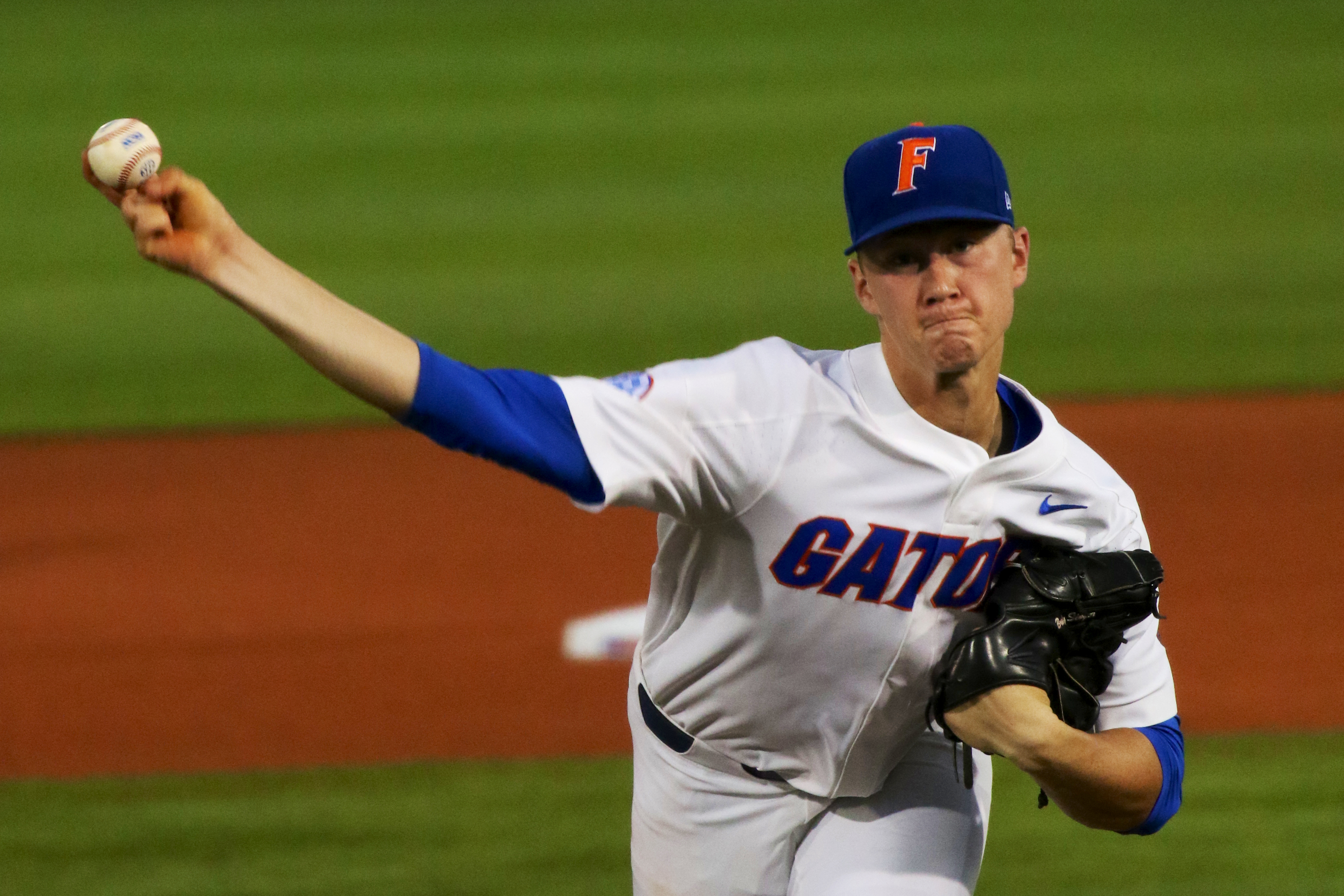
Singer with the Gators in 2018.

In 2018, as a junior, Singer was named the SEC Pitcher of the Year after leading the SEC with 10 wins while posting a 2.25 ERA. He also won the Dick Howser Trophy. He finished the 2018 season with a 12–3 record and a 2.55 ERA while opponents had a .204 batting average against him in 17 starts.

== Professional career ==
=== Kansas City Royals ===
The Kansas City Royals selected Singer with the 18th overall pick in the 2018 Major League Baseball draft. On July 3, he signed with the Royals for $4.25 million.

Singer made his professional debut in 2019 with the Wilmington Blue Rocks. After going 5–2 with a 1.87 ERA over ten starts, he was promoted to the Northwest Arkansas Naturals. Singer was named to the 2019 All-Star Futures Game. Over 16 starts with the Naturals, Singer went 7–3 with a 3.47 ERA, striking out 85 over 90 2/3 innings.

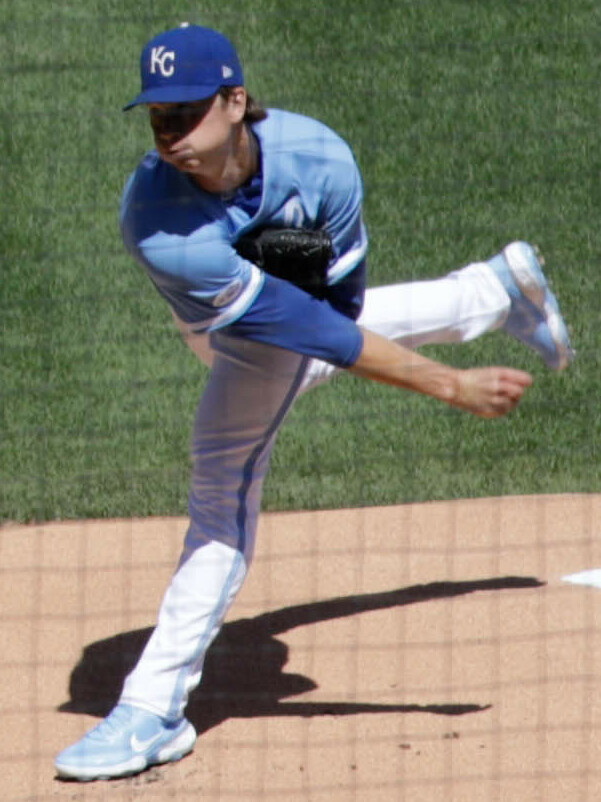
Singer with the Royals in 2022.

Singer joined the Royals at the beginning of the 2020 season and made his major league debut on July 25, 2020, against the Cleveland Indians and pitched five innings of two-run ball in a no-decision. He was the first pitcher from the 2018 draft class to make it to the majors and second player overall after Nico Hoerner. On September 10, he allowed no hits through 7 2/3 innings against the Cleveland Indians until he gave up a hit to Austin Hedges in the bottom of the eighth inning. In his next start against the Detroit Tigers, Singer fell one pitch short of an immaculate inning, when Miguel Cabrera fouled off Singer's ninth pitch of the inning. Cabrera then struck out on the next pitch. With the Royals in 2020, Singer appeared in 12 games, with a 4–5 record with 4.06 ERA and 61 strikeouts in 64 1/3 innings pitched.

In 2021, Singer started 27 games for the Royals and went 5-10 with a 4.91 ERA, 131 strikeouts, and 53 walks over 128 1/3 innings. He opened the 2022 season in Kansas City's bullpen. He was optioned to the Triple-A Omaha Storm Chasers in late April. He returned to the Royals' starting rotation in mid-May and finished the season with a career-best 10–5 record and 3.23 ERA in 153 1/3 innings.

Singer started 29 games for Kansas City during the 2023 campaign, registering an 8–11 record and 5.52 ERA with 133 strikeouts over 159 2/3 innings of work. Singer made 32 starts for the Royals in 2024, compiling a 9–13 record and 3.71 ERA with 170 strikeouts across 179 2/3 innings pitched.

=== Cincinnati Reds ===
On November 22, 2024, the Royals traded Singer to the Cincinnati Reds for Jonathan India and Joey Wiemer. Singer and India were college teammates. Singer made his Reds debut on March 31, 2025; he pitched seven innings, allowed one hit and walked two batters, while striking out eight batters as the winning pitcher in a 14–3 blowout over the Texas Rangers. In 2025 he was 14-12 with a 4.03 ERA, led the NL in fewest home runs per 9 innings (1.0008), and was 4th in wins.

In 2026 he was 6-14 with a 5.85 ERA, led the NL in losses,earned runs (102), and errors by a pitcher (4), and was 4th in home runs (32).

== International career ==
Singer pitched for the United States in the 2023 World Baseball Classic, allowing four runs in two innings. In the Americans' loss to Mexico on March 12, 2023, Singer gave up a home run to Joey Meneses after a double to Randy Arozarena that led to Arozarena's celebratory crossed arms pose.

== Personal life ==
For Christmas in 2018, Singer surprised his parents by paying off their bank loan as well as all of their debt.

In 2022, Singer married his wife, Tori. They have one son.
