= Bichette =

Bichette is a surname. Notable people with the surname include:

- Bo Bichette (born 1998), American baseball player
- Dante Bichette (born 1963), American baseball player and coach
- Dante Bichette Jr. (born 1992), Brazilian-American baseball player, son of Dante and brother of Bo
