= Blake Street =

Blake Street can refer to:

- Blake Street (York), a road in York, in England
- Blake Street railway station, a station in Sutton Coldfield, in England
- The location of the Coors Field in Denver, Colorado, which led to the Blake Street Bombers nickname
