= 2005 Little League World Series results =

Children's baseball competition results

All times shown are US EDT.

Pool play
Pool A	(Hawaii) HI 7◄ (Pennsylvania) PA 1 Linescore	(Florida) FL 7◄ (Iowa) IA 3 Linescore	(Pennsylvania) PA 1 (Florida) FL 3◄ Linescore	(Iowa) IA 3 (Hawaii) HI 7◄ Linescore	(Hawaii) HI 10◄ (Florida) FL 0 Linescore	(Iowa) IA 0 (F/4) (Pennsylvania) PA 15◄ Linescore
Pool B	(Maine) ME 2 (Louisiana) LA 3◄ Linescore	(California) CA 7◄ (Kentucky) KY 2 Linescore	(Kentucky) KY 8 (Louisiana) LA 9◄ Linescore	(Maine) ME 3 (California) CA 7◄ Linescore	(Kentucky) KY 2 (Maine) ME 3◄ Linescore	(Louisiana) LA 3 (California) CA 9◄ Linescore
Pool C	(Guam) GUM 6◄ (Russia) RUS 2 Linescore	(Canada) CAN 2◄ (Mexico) MEX 0 Linescore	(Canada) CAN 0 (Guam) GUM 5◄ Linescore	(Russia) RUS 0 (Mexico) MEX 7◄ Linescore	(Canada) CAN 2◄ (Russia) RUS 1 Linescore	(Guam) GUM 5◄ (Mexico) MEX 3 Linescore
Pool D	(Japan) JPN 3◄ (Saudi Arabia) KSA 0 Linescore	(Curaçao) CUR 5◄ (Venezuela) VEN 4 (F/8); Linescore	JPN 9◄ CUR 0 Linescore	JPN 7◄ VEN 4 Linescore	KSA 0 CUR 3◄ Linescore	KSA 0 VEN 4◄ Linescore
Elimination round
Semifinals	Japan 11◄ Canada 0 (F/5); Linescore			California 6◄ Florida 2 Linescore		
Semifinals	Curaçao 16◄ Guam 1 (F/5); Linescore			Hawaii 2◄ Louisiana 0 Linescore		
Finals	California 1 Hawaii 6◄ Linescore			Japan 0 Curaçao 2◄ Linescore		
Consolation game	Japan 4 California 5◄ Linescore					
Championship game	Curaçao 6 (F/7); Hawaii 7◄ Linescore					

== Pool play ==
=== Pool A ===
Region	Record
Hawaii	3–0
Florida	2–1
Pennsylvania	1–2
Iowa	0–3

==== Hawaii 7, Pennsylvania 1 ====
August 19 4:00 pm EDT Lamade Stadium
Team	1	2	3	4	5	6	R	H	E
Hawaii ◄	4	0	3	0	0	0	7	8	1
Pennsylvania	0	1	0	0	0	0	1	4	0
WP: Quentin Guevara (1–0) LP: Keith Terry Jr. (0–1) Sv: None; Home runs: HI: Alaka'i Aglipay (1), Vonn Fe'ao (1), Michael Memea (1); PA: Daniel Denton (1)

==== Florida 7, Iowa 3 ====
August 19 8:00 pm EDT Lamade Stadium
Team	1	2	3	4	5	6	R	H	E
Florida ◄	1	0	1	0	2	3	7	6	0
Iowa	3	0	0	0	0	0	3	4	1
WP: Dante Bichette Jr. (1–0) LP: Ryan Shumaker (0–1) Sv: None; Home runs: FL: Skip Kovar (1), Dante Bichette Jr. (1); IA: Ryan Shumaker (1)

==== Florida 3, Pennsylvania 1 ====
August 20 8:00 pm EDT Lamade Stadium
Team	1	2	3	4	5	6	R	H	E
Pennsylvania	0	0	0	0	1	0	1	8	1
Florida ◄	2	0	0	0	1	0	3	4	2
WP: Skip Kovar (1–0) LP: Darren Lauer (0–1) Sv: None; Home runs: PA: None; FL: Dante Bichette Jr. (2)

==== Hawaii 7, Iowa 3 ====
August 21 3:00 pm EDT Volunteer Stadium
Team	1	2	3	4	5	6	R	H	E
Iowa	0	0	0	0	0	3	3	5	3
Hawaii ◄	2	1	1	2	1	X	7	8	3
WP: Myron Enos (1–0) LP: Kyle Franklin (0–1) Sv: None; Home runs: IA: Spencer Mallonee (1); HI: Alaka'i Aglipay (2), Vonn Fe'ao (2), Quentin Guevara (1)

==== Hawaii 10, Florida 0 ====
August 22 3:00 pm EDT Lamade Stadium
Team	1	2	3	4	5	6	R	H	E
Hawaii ◄	2	0	4	0	3	1	10	9	1
Florida	0	0	0	0	0	0	0	4	2
WP: Alaka'i Aglipay (1–0) LP: Mike Tomlinson (0–1) Sv: None; Home runs: HI: Sheyne Baniaga (1), Michael Memea (2); FL: None

==== Pennsylvania 15, Iowa 0 ====
August 22 8:00 pm EDT Lamade Stadium
Team	1	2	3	4	5	6	R	H	E
Iowa	0	0	0	0	–	–	0	0	1
Pennsylvania ◄	5	3	7	X	–	–	15	13	0
WP: Keith Terry Jr. (1–1) LP: Eric Weiman (0–1) Sv: None; Home runs: IA: None; PA: Greg Guers (1), Blaise Lezynski 2 (2), Benn Parker (1), Keith Terry Jr. (1), Darren Lauer (1); Notes: Completed early due to mercy rule.

=== Pool B ===
Region	Record
California	3–0
Louisiana	2–1
Maine	1–2
Kentucky	0–3

==== Louisiana 3, Maine 2 ====
August 20 11:00 am EDT Volunteer Stadium
Team	1	2	3	4	5	6	R	H	E
Maine	0	2	0	0	0	0	2	3	0
Louisiana ◄	0	0	0	0	0	3	3	7	0
WP: Ryan Bergeron (1–0) LP: Sean Murphy (0–1) Sv: None; Home runs: ME: Nick Finocchiaro (1), Michael Mowatt (1); LA: None

==== California 7, Kentucky 2 ====
August 20 3:00 pm EDT Volunteer Stadium
Team	1	2	3	4	5	6	R	H	E
California ◄	0	0	7	0	0	0	7	7	2
Kentucky	1	0	1	0	0	0	2	4	1
WP: Kalen Pimentel (1–0) LP: Dalton West (0–1) Sv: None; Home runs: CA: Nathan Lewis (1), Aaron Kim (1); KY: Luke Daugherty (1)

==== Louisiana 9, Kentucky 8 ====
August 21 1:00 pm EDT Lamade Stadium
Team	1	2	3	4	5	6	R	H	E
Kentucky	2	5	1	0	0	0	8	8	5
Louisiana ◄	1	0	1	2	4	1	9	12	2
WP: Sam Scofield (1–0) LP: Nolan Miller (0–1) Sv: None; Home runs: KY: Dalton West (1), Luke Daugherty (2); LA: None

==== California 7, Maine 3 ====
August 21 8:00 pm EDT Lamade Stadium
Team	1	2	3	4	5	6	R	H	E
Maine	1	0	0	0	2	0	3	5	1
California ◄	0	0	0	2	5	X	7	6	1
WP: Reed Reznicek (1–0) LP: Nick Finocchiaro (0–1) Sv: None; Home runs: ME: Michael Mowatt (2); CA: Kalen Pimentel (2)

==== Maine 3, Kentucky 2 ====
August 23 3:00 pm EDT Lamade Stadium
Team	1	2	3	4	5	6	R	H	E
Kentucky	0	0	2	0	0	0	2	4	2
Maine ◄	0	0	2	0	0	X	3	3	1
WP: Sean Murphy (1–1) LP: Luke Daugherty (0–1) Sv: Joey Royer (1); Home runs: KY: None; ME: Zach Collett (1)

==== California 9, Louisiana 3 ====
August 23 7:30 pm EDT Lamade Stadium
Team	1	2	3	4	5	6	R	H	E
Louisiana	0	0	1	1	0	1	3	11	0
California ◄	3	0	2	4	0	X	9	10	2
WP: Austin White (1–0) LP: Connor Toups (0–1) Sv: None; Home runs: LA: Jace Conrad (1); CA: Reed Reznicek (1), Kalen Pimentel (3)

=== Pool C ===
Region	Record
Guam	3–0
Canada	2–1
Mexico	1–2
Russia	0–3

==== Guam 6, Russia 2 ====
August 19 6:00 pm EDT Volunteer Stadium
Team	1	2	3	4	5	6	R	H	E
Guam ◄	3	3	0	0	0	0	6	6	2
Russia	0	0	0	2	0	0	2	2	1
WP: Trea Santos (1–0) LP: Andrey Vesenev (0–1) Sv: None; Home runs: GUM: Calvert Alokoa (1); RUS: None

==== Canada 2, Mexico 0 ====
August 20 6:00 pm EDT Volunteer Stadium
Team	1	2	3	4	5	6	R	H	E
Canada ◄	0	2	0	0	0	0	2	9	0
Mexico	0	0	0	0	0	0	0	2	0
WP: Chris Fischer (1–0) LP: José Valenzuela (0–1) Sv: None; Home runs: CAN: None; MEX: None

==== Guam 5, Canada 0 ====
August 21 5:00 pm EDT Lamade Stadium
Team	1	2	3	4	5	6	R	H	E
Canada	0	0	0	0	0	0	0	1	2
Guam ◄	1	0	2	1	1	X	5	8	0
WP: Sean Manley (1–0) LP: Jeff Degano (0–1) Sv: None; Home runs: CAN: None; GUM: None

==== Mexico 7, Russia 0 ====
August 22 11:00 am EDT Lamade Stadium
Team	1	2	3	4	5	6	R	H	E
Russia	0	0	0	0	0	0	0	4	1
Mexico ◄	1	3	0	3	0	X	7	11	1
WP: Julio Arciniega (1–0) LP: Anton Smirnov (0–1) Sv: None; Home runs: RUS: None; MEX: None

==== Canada 2, Russia 1 ====
August 23 11:00 am EDT Lamade Stadium
Team	1	2	3	4	5	6	R	H	E
Canada ◄	2	0	0	0	0	0	2	1	0
Russia	1	0	0	0	0	0	1	4	3
WP: Alex Dunbar (1–0) LP: Alexander Khudyakov (0–1) Sv: None; Home runs: CAN: None; RUS: None

==== Guam 5, Mexico 3 ====
August 23 5:30 pm EDT Volunteer Stadium
Team	1	2	3	4	5	6	R	H	E
Guam ◄	0	0	0	1	4	0	5	4	1
Mexico	1	0	2	0	0	0	3	6	2
WP: Trea Santos (2–0) LP: Vicente Ayala (0–1) Sv: None; Home runs: GUM: None; MEX: None

=== Pool D ===
Region	Record
Japan	3–0
Curaçao	2–1
Venezuela	1–2
Saudi Arabia	0–3

==== Japan 3, Saudi Arabia 0 ====
August 20 1:00 pm EDT Lamade Stadium
Team	1	2	3	4	5	6	R	H	E
Japan ◄	0	0	3	0	0	0	3	6	0
Saudi Arabia	0	0	0	0	0	0	0	2	2
WP: Takuya Sakamoto (1–0) LP: Alexander Robinett (0–1) Sv: None; Home runs: JPN: None; KSA: None

==== Curaçao 5, Venezuela 4 ====
August 20 4:00 pm EDT Lamade Stadium
Team	1	2	3	4	5	6	7	8	R	H	E
Curaçao ◄	0	3	1	0	0	0	0	1	5	8	2
Venezuela	0	0	0	0	4	0	0	0	4	3	2
WP: Sorick Liberia (1–0) LP: Othecber Orozco (0–1) Sv: None; Home runs: CUR: Sorick Liberia (1); VEN: Richard Alvarez, Jr. (1)

==== Japan 9, Curaçao 0 ====
August 21 7:00 pm EDT Volunteer Stadium
Team	1	2	3	4	5	6	R	H	E
Japan ◄	3	1	0	1	0	4	9	7	0
Curaçao	0	0	0	0	0	0	0	3	1
WP: Yusuke Taira (1–0) LP: Diënston Manuela (0–1) Sv: None; Home runs: JPN: Yusuke Taira (1), Yuki Mizuma (1); CUR: None

==== Japan 7, Venezuela 4 ====
August 22 1:00 pm EDT Volunteer Stadium
Team	1	2	3	4	5	6	R	H	E
Japan ◄	2	1	1	1	1	1	7	9	0
Venezuela	0	0	4	0	0	0	4	9	1
WP: Yuki Mizuma (1–0) LP: Martin Cornieles (0–1) Sv: None; Home runs: JPN: Yuki Mizuma (2); VEN: Richard Alvarez, Jr. (2), Martin Cornieles (1)

==== Curaçao 3, Saudi Arabia 0 ====
August 22 6:00 pm EDT Volunteer Stadium
Team	1	2	3	4	5	6	R	H	E
Saudi Arabia	0	0	0	0	0	0	0	1	1
Curaçao ◄	2	1	0	0	0	X	3	1	0
WP: Sorick Liberia (2–0) LP: Anrew Holden (0–1) Sv: None; Home runs: KSA: None; CUR: None

==== Venezuela 4, Saudi Arabia 0 ====
August 23 1:00 pm EDT Volunteer Stadium
Team	1	2	3	4	5	6	R	H	E
Saudi Arabia	0	0	0	0	0	0	0	2	1
Venezuela ◄	2	2	0	0	0	X	4	4	0
WP: Victor Sequera (1–0) LP: Alexander Robinett (0–2) Sv: None; Home runs: KSA: None; VEN: Gabriel Santana (1)

== Elimination round ==
Quarter-finals
August 24 - Lamade (F/5)
Japan	11
Canada	0
August 25 - Lamade (F/5)
Guam	1
Curaçao	16
August 24 - Lamade
California	6
Florida	2
August 25 - Lamade
Hawaii	2
Louisiana	0

Semi-finals
August 27 - Lamade
Japan	0
Curaçao	2
August 27 - Lamade
California	1
Hawaii	6

Final
August 28 - Lamade (F/7)
Curaçao	6
Hawaii	7
Third place
August 28 - Volunteer
Japan	4
California	5

=== Semifinals ===
==== Japan 11, Canada 0 ====
August 24 3:00 pm EDT Lamade Stadium
Team	1	2	3	4	5	6	R	H	E
Japan ◄	0	0	2	1	8	–	11	12	0
Canada	0	0	0	0	0	–	0	1	0
WP: Takuya Sakamoto (2–0) LP: Chris Fischer (1–1) Sv: None; Home runs: JPN: Yusuke Taira (2), Kisho Watanabe (1); CAN: None; Notes: Completed early due to mercy rule.

==== Curaçao 16, Guam 1 ====
August 25 3:00 pm EDT Lamade Stadium
Team	1	2	3	4	5	6	R	H	E
Curaçao ◄	0	3	2	0	11	–	16	13	0
Guam	1	0	0	0	0	–	1	2	2
WP: Christopher Garia (1–0) LP: Sean Manley (1–1) Sv: None; Home runs: CUR: Sherman La Crus (1), Willie Rifaela (1); GUM: None; Notes: Completed early due to mercy rule.

==== California 6, Florida 2 ====
August 24 7:30 pm EDT Lamade Stadium
Team	1	2	3	4	5	6	R	H	E
California ◄	0	1	1	1	0	3	6	8	1
Florida	0	0	2	0	0	0	2	6	1
WP: Kalen Pimentel (2–0) LP: Dante Bichette Jr. (1–1) Sv: None; Home runs: CA: None; FL: None

==== Hawaii 2, Louisiana 0 ====
August 25 7:30 pm EDT Lamade Stadium
Team	1	2	3	4	5	6	R	H	E
Louisiana	0	0	0	0	0	0	0	5	2
Hawaii ◄	0	0	0	2	0	X	2	1	0
WP: Myron Enos (2–0) LP: Jace Conrad (0–1) Sv: None; Home runs: LA: None; HI: Sheyne Baniaga (2)

=== United States Championship ===
==== Hawaii 6, California 1 ====
August 27 3:30 pm EDT Lamade Stadium
Team	1	2	3	4	5	6	R	H	E
California	0	0	0	0	1	0	1	2	2
Hawaii ◄	0	0	0	4	2	X	6	2	0
WP: Alaka'i Aglipay (2–0) LP: Nathan Lewis (0–1) Sv: None; Home runs: CA: None; HI: Vonn Fe'ao (3)

=== International Championship ===
==== Curaçao 2, Japan 0 ====
August 27 7:30 pm EDT Lamade Stadium
Team	1	2	3	4	5	6	R	H	E
Japan	0	0	0	0	0	0	0	2	1
Curaçao ◄	2	0	0	0	0	X	2	3	0
WP: Jurickson Profar (1–0) LP: Yusuke Taira (1–1) Sv: None; Home runs: JPN: None; CUR: None

=== Consolation Game ===
==== California 5, Japan 4 ====
August 28 12:00 pm EDT Volunteer Stadium
Team	1	2	3	4	5	6	R	H	E
Japan	0	0	3	0	1	0	4	4	0
California ◄	2	2	0	0	0	1	5	6	2
WP: Kalen Pimentel (3–0) LP: Yuki Mizuma (1–1) Sv: None; Home runs: JPN: Yusuke Taira (3); CA: Kalen Pimentel (4), Ryan Gura (1)

=== Championship game ===
==== Hawaii 7, Curaçao 6 ====
August 28 3:30 pm EDT Lamade Stadium
Team	1	2	3	4	5	6	7	R	H	E
Curaçao	0	0	3	0	3	0	0	6	7	0
Hawaii ◄	0	1	2	0	0	3	1	7	10	2
WP: Vonn Fe'ao (1–0) LP: Christopher Garia (1–1) Sv: None; Home runs: CUR: Sorick Liberia (2), Darren Seferina (1); HI: Myron Enos (1), Alaka'i Aglipay (3), Michael Memea (3)
