= History of the Colorado Rockies =

The history of the Colorado Rockies began in 1991 when a Major League Baseball (MLB) expansion franchise for Denver, Colorado was granted to an ownership group headed by John Antonucci. In 1993, the Colorado Rockies started play in the National League (NL) West division. Since that date, the Rockies have reached the MLB postseason five times, four times as the National League wild card team. The team has been eliminated in the first round of the playoffs three times: in 1995, 2009 and 2017. In 2007, the Rockies advanced all the way to the World Series, only to be swept by the Boston Red Sox.

== Creation of the Rockies ==
Although Denver has a rich baseball history in the minor leagues dating to 1885, there had been several previous attempts to bring Major League Baseball to Colorado that had failed. In 1958, New York lawyer William Shea proposed the new Continental League as a rival to the two existing major leagues. In 1960, the Continental League announced that play would begin in April 1961 with eight teams, including one in Denver headed by Bob Howsam. However, the new league quickly evaporated, without ever playing a game, when the National League reached expansion agreements to put teams in New York City and Houston, removing much of the impetus behind the Continental League effort. Later on, the Pittsburgh Pirates were rumored to be relocating to Denver following the Pittsburgh drug trials in 1985, but that move did not happen. Repeated rumors of a move to Denver by the Oakland Athletics also proved false. Nonetheless, by the late 1980s, an MLB team seemed to be a possibility in Denver.

The Colorado Baseball Commission, led by banking executive Larry Varnell, was successful in getting Denver voters to approve a 0.1 percent sales tax to help finance a new baseball stadium. Also, an advisory committee was formed in 1990 by then-Governor of Colorado Roy Romer to recruit an ownership group. The group selected was led by John Antonucci, an Ohio beverage distributor, and Michael I. Monus, the head of the Phar-Mor drugstore chain. Local and regional companies—such as Erie Lake, Hensel Phelps Construction, KOA Radio, and the Rocky Mountain News—rounded out the group. On July 5, 1991, the National League approved Denver and South Florida as the sites for two expansion teams to begin play in 1993; with this, MLB now had teams in all four time zones in the contiguous U.S.; the Rockies were the league's first Mountain Time Zone-based team. The name "Rockies" was chosen due to Denver's proximity to the Rocky Mountains, which is reflected in their logo; the name was previously used by the city's first NHL team (who are now the New Jersey Devils). With the arrival of the Rockies, they displaced the Milwaukee Brewers-affiliated AAA American Association club, the Zephyrs, who had represented the market since 1955, to New Orleans, Louisiana.

The Rockies' first pick in the expansion draft was pitcher David Nied from the Atlanta Braves organization. Nied pitched 4 seasons for the Rockies.

== Ownership issues ==
After a 1992 accounting and embezzlement scandal at Phar-Mor tarnished Monus' reputation, both Monus and Antonucci were forced to sell their stakes in the franchise. For a time, no credible offers surfaced from Denver interests, and it looked like the franchise might move to Tampa, Florida before even playing a game. Finally, trucking-company executive Jerry McMorris became head of the ownership group and served as the initial public face of management. His relationship with the other partners was somewhat poor, and his role in the leadership of the franchise diminished over time. His situation was not helped by the 1999 failure of his trucking firm and subsequent related legal issues.

Finally, in 2005, McMorris was forced to sell his stake in the team to Charlie and Dick Monfort. The Monforts were former executives with ConAgra, which acquired their family's meatpacking and distribution firm in 1987. Charlie had been CEO of the team since 2003, and Dick had been vice chairman since 1997. In 2011, Dick succeeded Charlie as chairman and CEO.

== Inaugural season ==
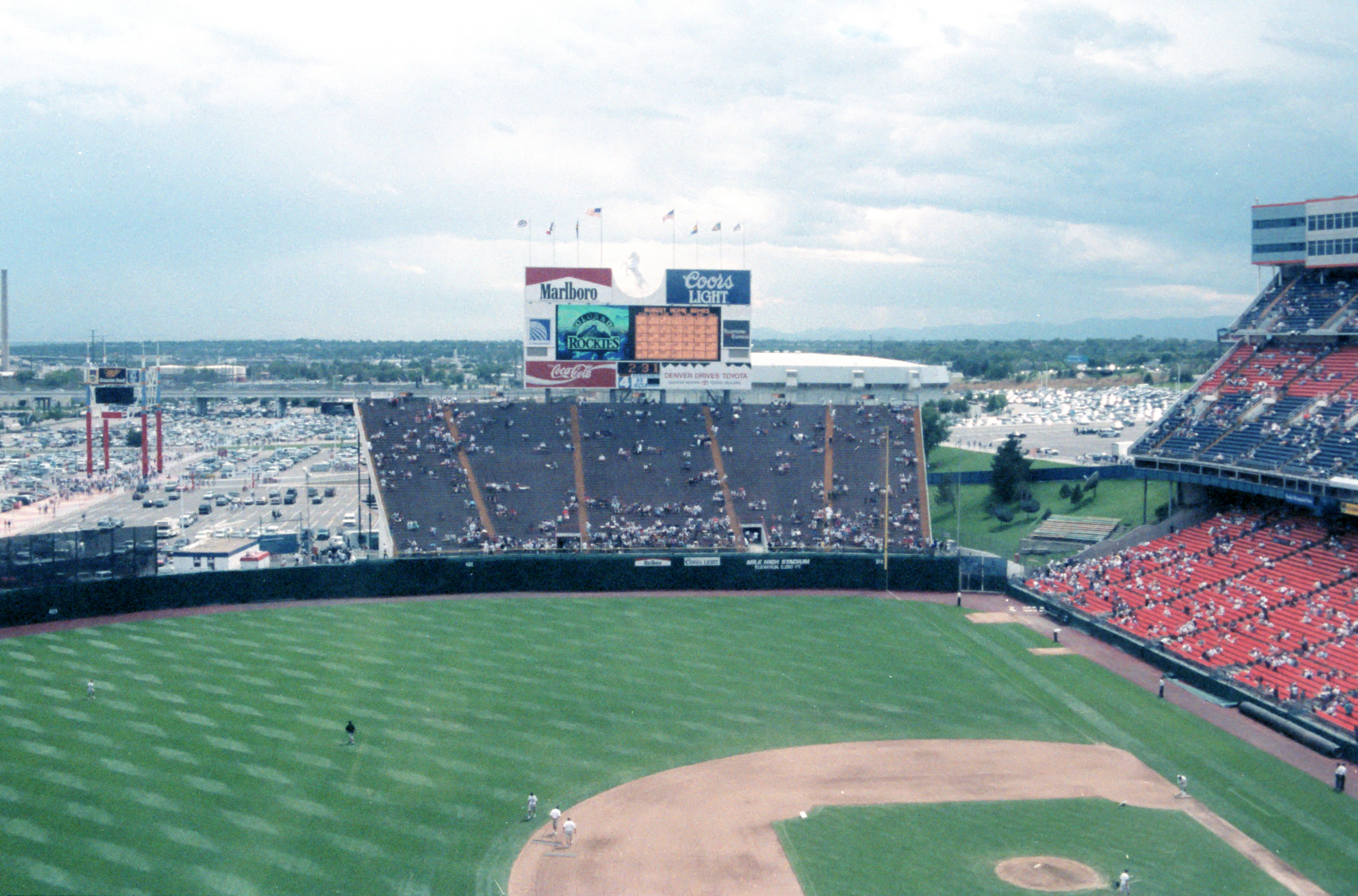
The Braves play the Rockies at Mile High Stadium on August 11, 1994

The first game in Rockies history was played on April 5, 1993, against the New York Mets at Shea Stadium. David Nied was the starting pitcher in a game the Rockies lost, 3–0. The franchise's first home game at Mile High Stadium, and first win in franchise history, came four days later with an 11–4 win over the Montreal Expos. The winning pitcher was Bryn Smith who beat his former team for the win. One of the most memorable plays in the game, and in team history, occurred in the bottom of the first inning when 2nd baseman, Eric Young of the Rockies hit a leadoff home run. The game was played before 80,227 fans, to date the largest crowd to see a single regular-season Major League Baseball game.

As is the case with many first-year expansion teams, the Rockies struggled in their first year. During one stretch in May, the team went 2–17. The team did not experience its first winning month until September, when they went 17–9. Still, the team finished the season with 67 wins, setting a record for a National League expansion franchise. In addition, despite the losses, the club saw a home attendance of 4,483,350 for the season, setting a Major League record that still stands and is not likely to be broken. Rockies first baseman Andrés Galarraga won the batting title, hitting .370 for the season after Manager Don Baylor persuaded Galarraga to change from a standard batting stance into an open one in which he squarely faced the pitcher, allowing him to see incoming pitches properly.

== The mid-1990s ==
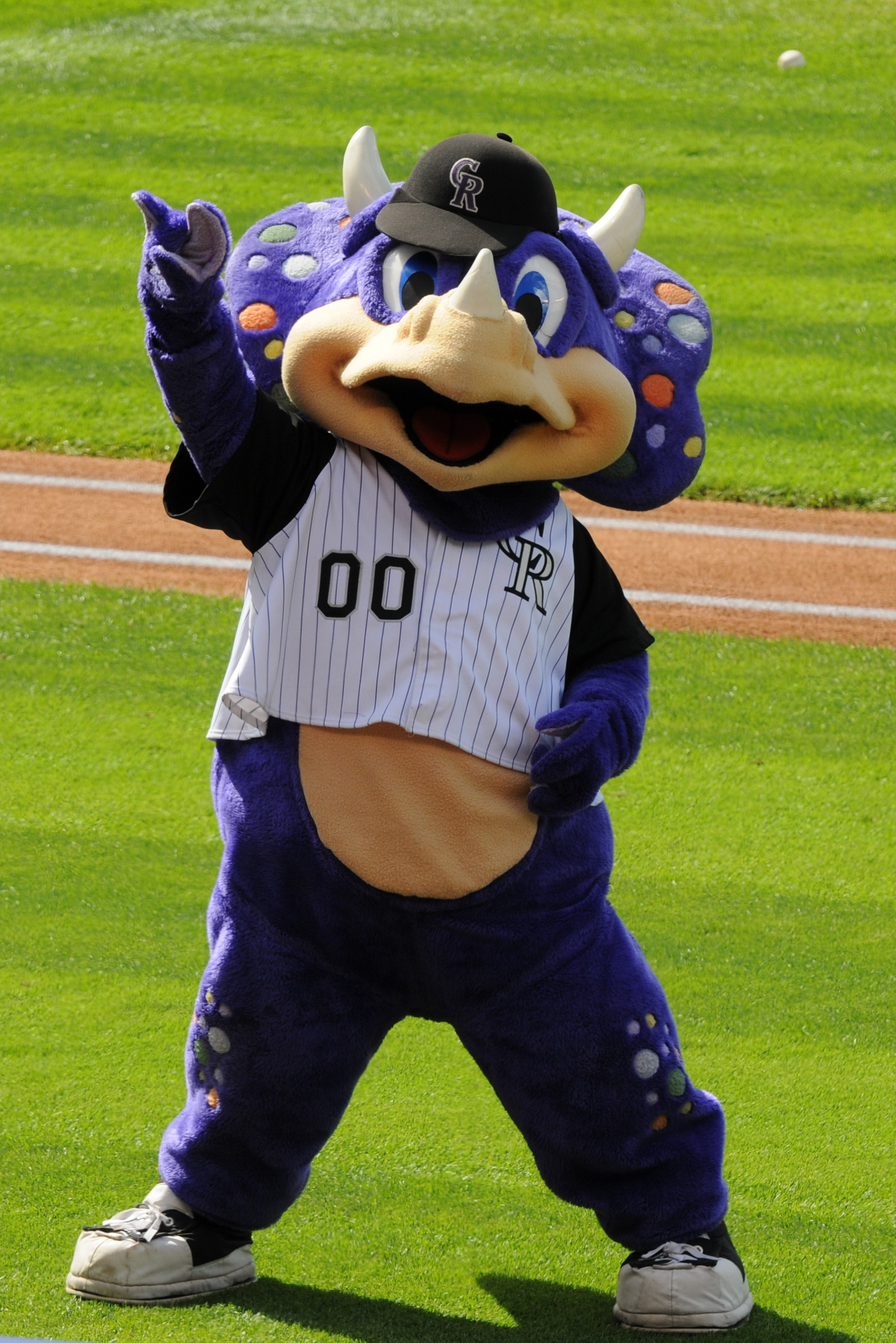
The mascot "Dinger" dinosaur.

On April 17, 1994, the Rockies beat Montreal 6–5, moving the team's record to 6–5—the first time in franchise history that the club had a winning record. However, that was the only time during that season that the club had a record over .500, finishing at 53–64 and in last place in the National League West when the strike ended the season that August. Despite the club's poor record, several Rockies hitters gained notoriety for their exploits at the plate, assisted by the thin and dry air of Denver, which purportedly allows balls to carry farther than at sea-level ballparks. Andrés Galarraga, a year after winning the batting title, hit 31 home runs, and teammate Dante Bichette hit 27; projected over a 162-game season, the two would have hit 43 and 37 home runs, respectively. The park's characteristics did not affect just home runs either: 33-year-old outfielder Mike Kingery, a career .252 hitter who did not play in the majors in 1993, batted .349 in 301 at-bats. The club once again led the majors in attendance, drawing 3,281,511 fans for the season. Had it not been for the strike that ended the season, they were on pace to break their own season attendance record.

=== 1995 playoff run and the opening of Coors Field ===
Prior to the 1995 season, the Rockies acquired free-agent outfielder Larry Walker, previously of the Montreal Expos. He was one of the four Rockies known collectively as the "Blake Street Bombers" -— named after the street on which the new ballpark (Coors Field) was located—along with Galarraga, Bichette, and third baseman Vinny Castilla, who had played sparingly with the Rockies during the previous season. The quartet combined to hit 139 homers—each hitting 30 or more—in the strike-shortened and late-starting 1995 season, with Bichette leading the way with 40. The team debuted in its new ballpark on April 26, 1995, in an 11–9 win over the New York Mets, and proceeded to win seven of their first eight games in the new season. The season ended with a 77–67 record, good for second place in the West division and the club's first playoff appearance as the Wild Card winner. Although most of the attention focused on the power-hitting lineup, much of the club's success was due to a strong bullpen, as relievers Darren Holmes, Curt Leskanic, Steve Reed, and Bruce Ruffin all posted earned-run averages below 3.40. The pitching staff's ERA of 4.97 was the lowest in club history until the 2006 team had a 4.66 ERA. The Rockies lost in the NLDS to the eventual 1995 World Series champion Atlanta Braves, 3 games to 1. The Rockies once again led the league in attendance for the season.

=== Post-1995 ===
In 1996, with all four Blake Street Bombers returning, the Rockies expected to contend, but an injury to Walker hurt the team. Walker played in only 83 games and batted .276 with 18 homers. However, outfielder Ellis Burks picked up the slack with an All-Star season, batting .344 with 40 homers and 128 RBI—one of three Rockies to hit forty or more homers that season, along with Galarraga and Castilla. The four Blake Street Bombers—now consisting of Bichette, Burks, Castilla, and Galarraga—once again hit at least 30 home runs each. The team set a major-league record by scoring 658 runs at home on the season, and Burks and Bichette became the first pair of teammates since Darryl Strawberry and Howard Johnson of the 1987 New York Mets to both steal 30 bases and hit 30 homers in the same season. However, the pitching staff—a strong point for the team in 1995—was beset by injuries: Bill Swift, who went 9–3 in 1995, started just three games, and the staff ERA ballooned to 5.60. As a result, the Rockies fell back to third place in the West with an 83–79 record.

A healthy Walker became the first player in club history to win the NL Most Valuable Player award in 1997, batting .366 with 49 homers and 130 RBI. Walker came very close to winning the Triple Crown that year, leading the league in home runs but finishing second to Tony Gwynn in batting average and third in RBI (teammate Galarraga led the league.) Once again, three Rockies (Walker, Galarraga, and Castilla) hit 40 or more homers; Walker also won the first Gold Glove in franchise history. As in 1996, though, the team's pitchers struggled and had a 5.25 ERA, and the Rockies could not improve upon their finish from the previous season.

== The beginning of the Helton era ==
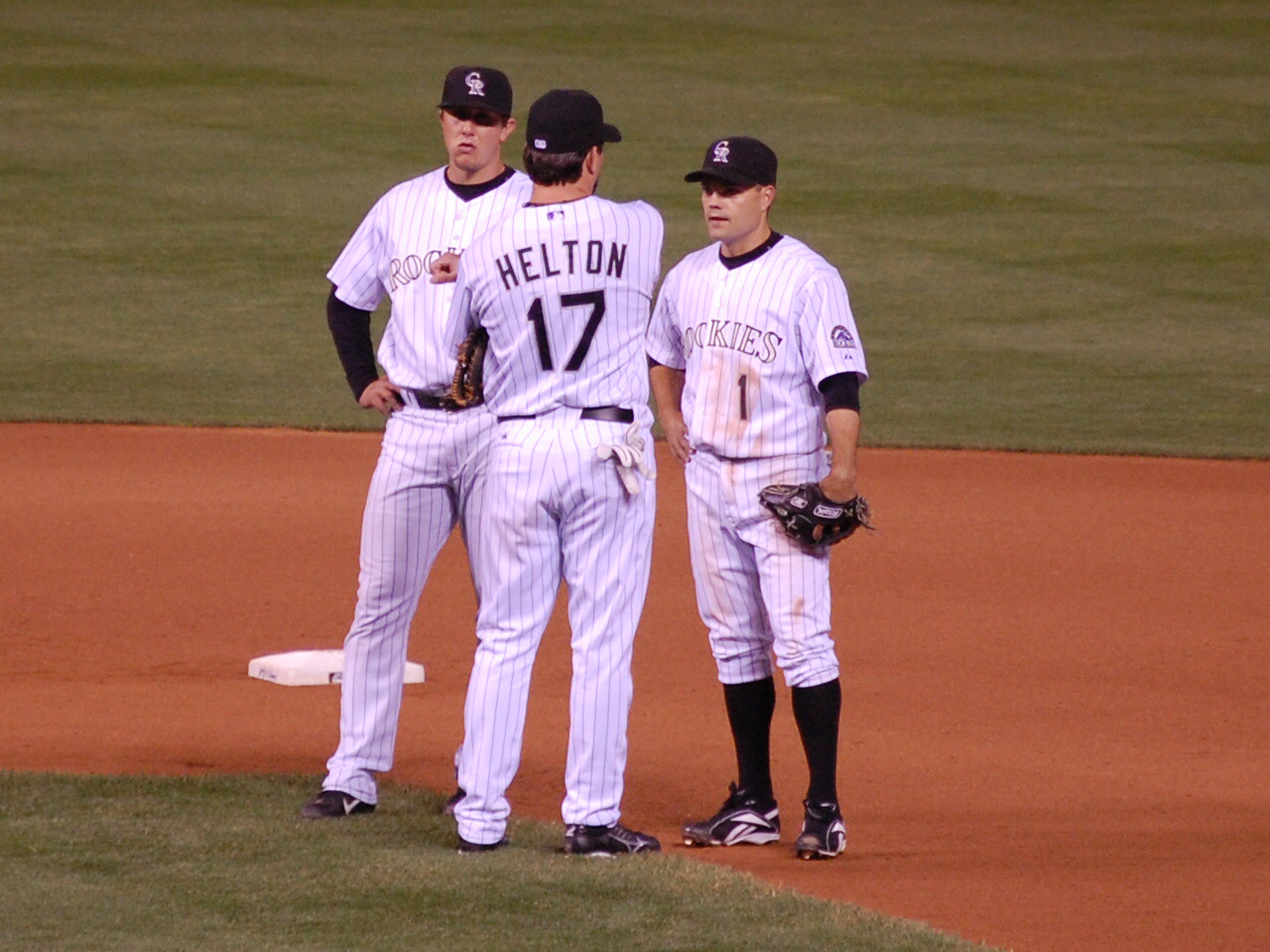
Left to right, Troy Tulowitzki, Todd Helton, and Jamey Carroll in 2007.

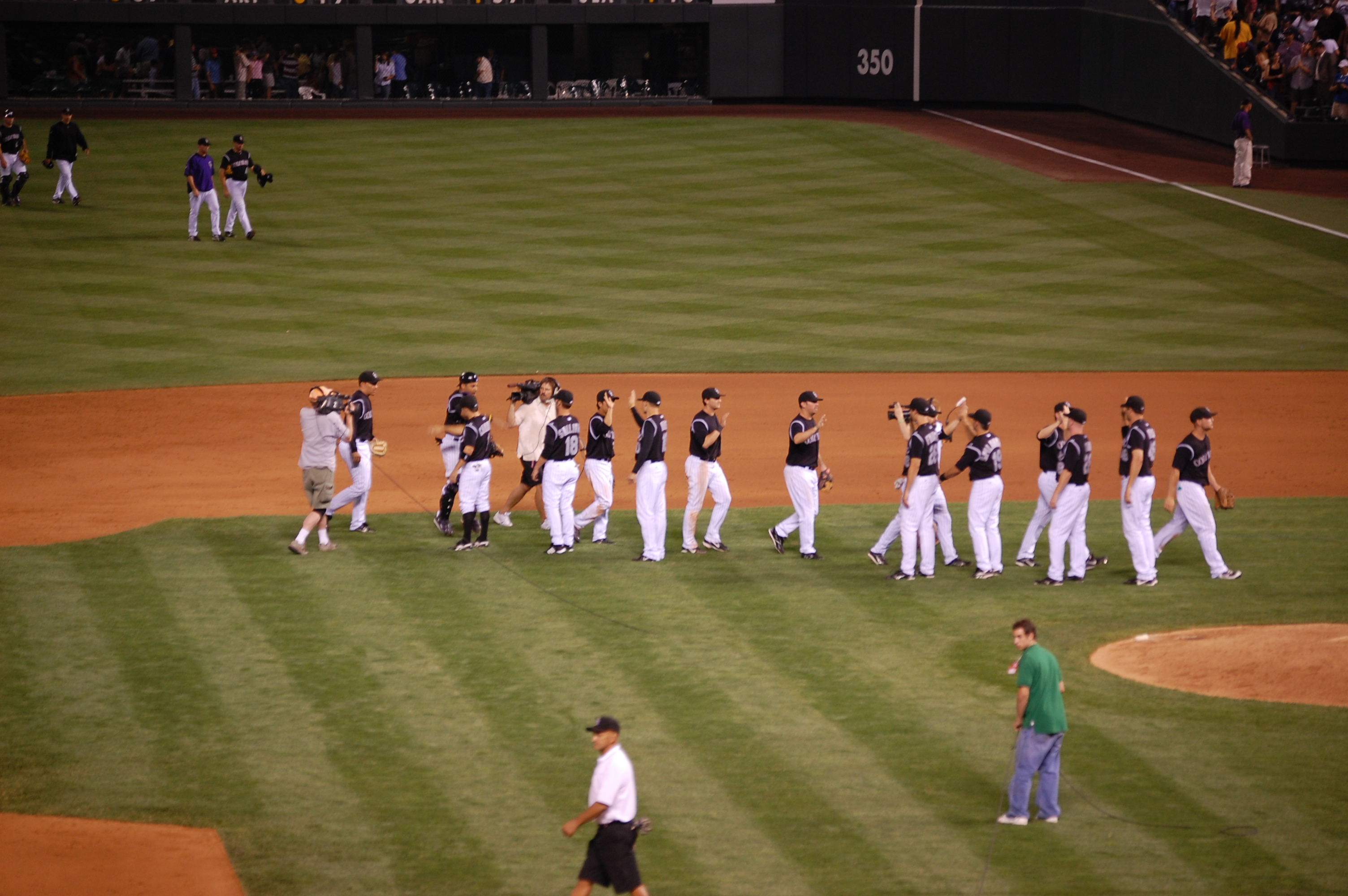
Colorado Rockies celebrate their second straight victory against the New York Yankees in Coors Field on June 19, 2007.

The Rockies were broken up after the 1997 season when an aging Galarraga signed with the Atlanta Braves as a free agent. His replacement was Todd Helton, who had been the club's first-round draft pick in 1995 out of the University of Tennessee. After a 4–1 start, the club lost its next eight games and struggled to a 77–85 record, finishing only ahead of the expansion Arizona Diamondbacks in the NL West. Pitcher Darryl Kile, signed as a free agent in the offseason, struggled in Colorado, going 13–17 with a 5.20 ERA—a far cry from his numbers the prior year as a member of the Houston Astros, when he went 19–7 with a 2.57 ERA. Kile became one of a long line of free-agent pitchers who struggled after signing with the Rockies. The team's struggles led to the firing of manager Don Baylor, the only manager in franchise history, following the season.

Jim Leyland, a two-time NL Manager of the Year who had won the World Series with the Florida Marlins two years earlier, was expected to bring the Rockies back into contention in 1999. Instead, the Rockies dropped even further, finishing 72–90 and in last place in the West as the Diamondbacks won the division in just their second year of existence. Helton was blossoming into a young developed hitter, batting .320 with 35 homers and 113 RBI; Castilla, Walker, and Bichette also hit more than 30 homers each. Once again, though, the team's pitching was a glaring weakness, as the staff had an ERA of 6.02. Kile, who was being paid over $8 million for the season, struggled mightily, going 8–13 with a 6.61 ERA, and he wound up being traded to the St. Louis Cardinals following the season. Kile finished fifth in voting for the Cy Young Award the following year, as he had in 1997 (the year before he joined the Rockies). The Leyland era lasted just one year, as a frustrated Leyland retired following the season, not to manage in the majors again until 2006, when he won an AL Pennant with the Detroit Tigers.

On April 4, 1999, the Rockies made history as they played their Opening Day game against the defending National League champion San Diego Padres at Estadio de Beisbol Monterrey in Monterrey, Mexico – marking the first time Major League Baseball opened the regular season outside the United States or Canada. Colorado beat San Diego, 8–2, in front of a crowd of 27,104 people. Only a little over 2 weeks later, the Columbine High School massacre postponed a home game with the Montreal Expos (it was made up as part of a doubleheader in August).

== The beginning of the Dan O'Dowd era ==
On August 20, 1999, Bob Gebhard, the only general manager in franchise history, announced his resignation. A month later, the Rockies named Dan O'Dowd as his replacement. After hiring Buddy Bell as the club's third manager, O'Dowd proceeded to make a series of offseason deals that changed the face of the franchise. Popular outfielder Dante Bichette was traded to the Cincinnati Reds. Later, he traded Kile to the Cardinals and, in a four-team trade, sent Vinny Castilla to the Tampa Bay Devil Rays. With those two deals, Larry Walker remained as the only player of the Blake Street Bombers still with the team. Walker wound up playing in only 87 games in 2000 due to injuries and hit just nine homers, as the Rockies had a completely different look from prior years. Perhaps not surprisingly given the injury to Walker and the trading of two of the team's most popular players, the Rockies finished third in the National League in attendance in 2000, marking the first time in club history that it did not lead the league in attendance.

Despite the major changes made to the team in the offseason, the team wound up with its first winning season since 1997. Helton, in his third full year in the majors, was becoming a bona fide superstar, winning the batting title with a .372 average and also leading the league with 147 RBI while hitting 42 homers. However, he finished just fifth in MVP voting, perhaps because the team finished fourth in the division and also possibly due to bias by voters because he played half of his games in hitter-friendly Coors Field. 2000 also marked the first of five consecutive All-Star Game appearances for Helton. The pitching staff also improved its ERA to 5.26, helping the team to an 82–80 record.

Although previous big-name pitchers, including Bill Swift, Bret Saberhagen, and Darryl Kile, had struggled in Colorado, following the 2000 season O'Dowd made two very splashy signings in the free-agent market, signing Denny Neagle to a five-year contract worth $51 million, followed five days later by signing Mike Hampton to an eight-year, $121 million contract. Two years earlier, Hampton had won 22 games and finished second in voting for the Cy Young Award as a member of the Houston Astros, while Neagle had been a 20-game winner in 1997 for the Atlanta Braves and had won 15 games in 2000. The two star pitchers were expected by the Rockies to change the team's fortunes.

Instead, the two flopped, much as their predecessors had. Hampton, after a strong first half in 2001, completely fell apart in 2002, going 7–15 with a 6.15 ERA and demanding a trade following the season. Neagle went 19–23 in three years with the Rockies; he was injured in 2003 and never pitched in the majors again before the Rockies released him after the 2004 season. The Rockies went 73–89 in both years that Hampton and Neagle were in Colorado, and the amount of money owed them (the Rockies paid a sizable portion of Hampton's salary even after he was traded to the Atlanta Braves) crippled the team for the next several years.

Under previous general manager Gebhard, the Rockies had largely neglected their farm system and mostly relied on signing veteran free agents from other clubs; this was possible due to the high attendance numbers in the club's first few years of attendance. However, as attendance began to dwindle—the Rockies fell to just sixth in the National League in attendance in 2002, and ninth in 2003 and 2004—the club could no longer afford to build through big-name free agents. In 1999, the Rockies spent their first-round draft pick on Baylor University pitcher Jason Jennings; three years later, Jennings went 16–8 with a 4.52 ERA. In the process, Jennings became the first Rockies player to win the National League Rookie of the Year award.

With Hampton out of town and Neagle injured much of the year, Jennings became the centerpiece of the Rockies' pitching staff in 2003. Despite a fourth straight All-Star season by Helton and 36 homers by outfielder Preston Wilson, the Rockies finished just 74–88. In addition to Jennings, though, young pitchers Shawn Chacón and Aaron Cook showed promise.

In 2004, the Rockies acquired Vinny Castilla, who had been with the club for its inaugural 1993 season, once again, and he hit 35 homers. However, Wilson and Larry Walker spent much of the season on the disabled list, forcing the Rockies to play Matt Holliday, who had been slated to start the season at Triple-A. While the Rockies struggled to a 68–94 record—the second worst record in club history—the club's Triple-A affiliate, the Colorado Springs Sky Sox, went 78–65. Declining attendance meant that the club's payroll could no longer support a franchise stocked largely with veterans from other clubs. In addition, Walker, who had been with the team since 1995 and was widely regarded as the best player in team history, was now 37 years old, and injuries prevented him from playing much of the time. Because he could still be useful to a contending team, the Rockies traded him to the St. Louis Cardinals in August for three minor-leaguers.

== Generation-R ==
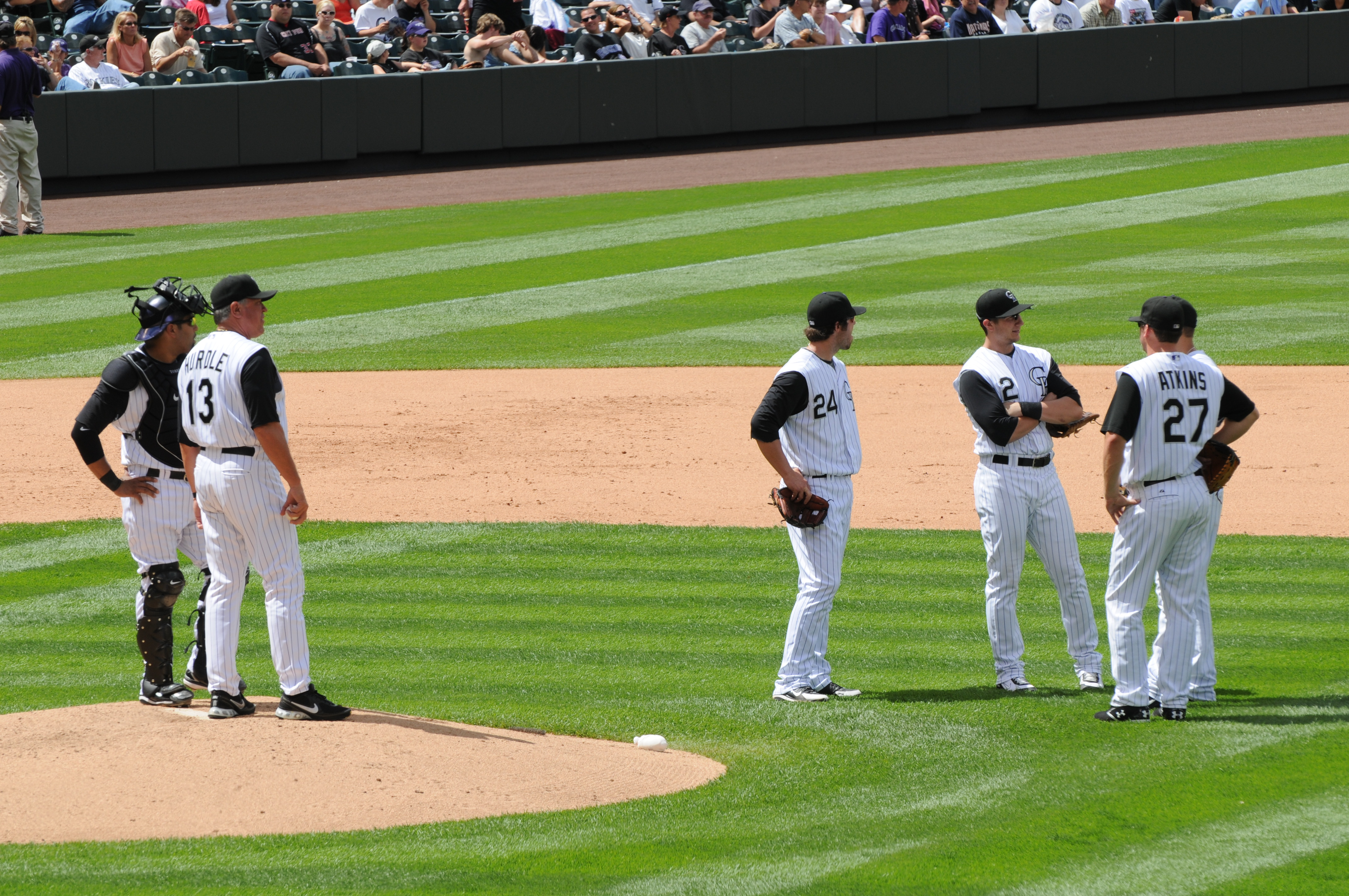
Former manager Clint Hurdle making a pitching change

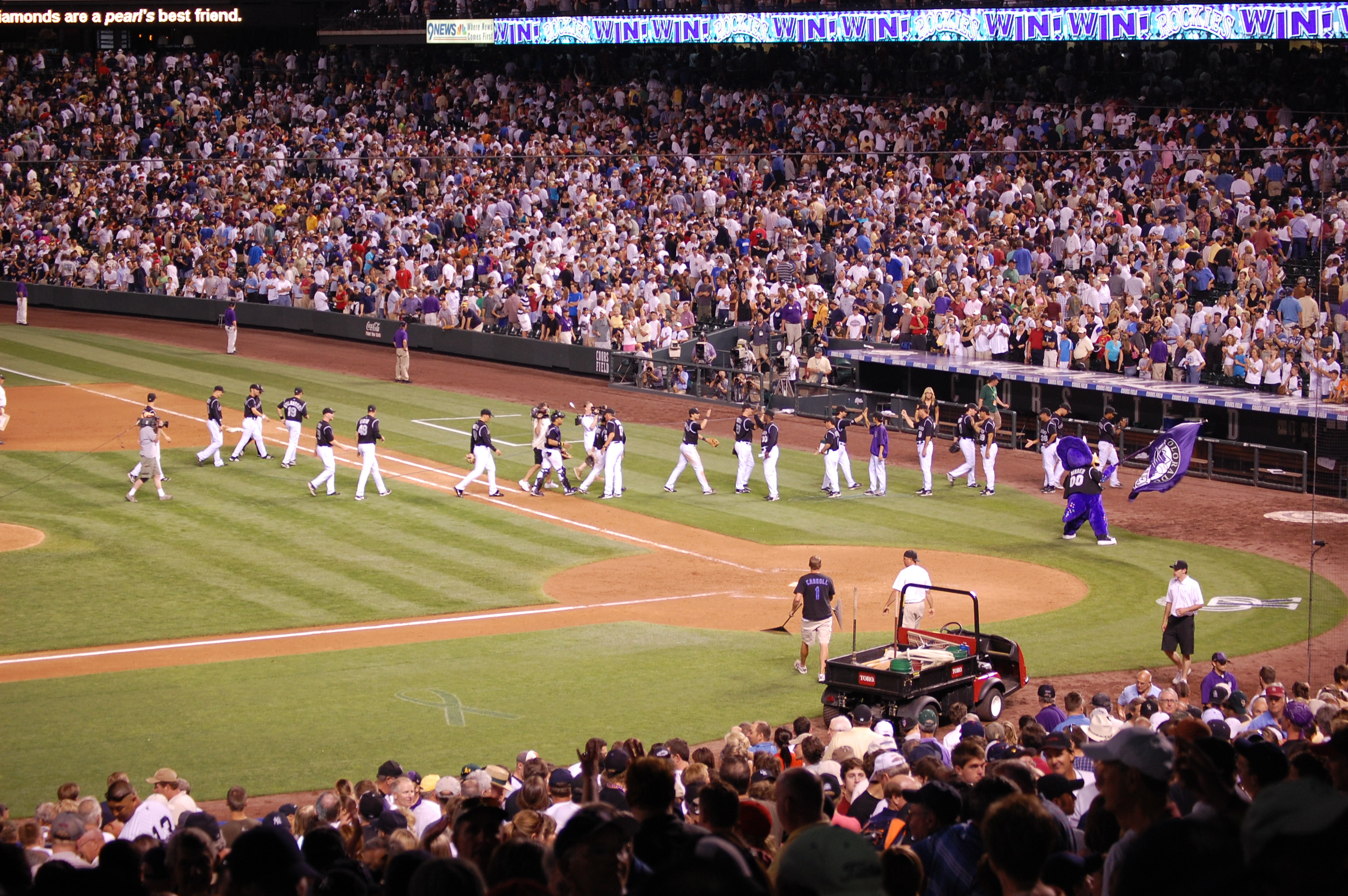
Colorado Rockies on June 19, 2007, in Coors Field

The trade of Walker set in motion a series of moves that led to an overhaul of the club's roster. Castilla and Jeromy Burnitz, who led the team with 37 homers in 2004, were allowed to leave as free agents following the season. Catcher Charles Johnson, who had been acquired along with Wilson in the Hampton trade, was traded to the Boston Red Sox. Royce Clayton, the club's starting shortstop in 2004, also was allowed to leave. Along with Holliday, who had performed ably while Wilson and Walker were out, the club promoted Garrett Atkins, Brad Hawpe, Clint Barmes, and J.D. Closser, who spent most of 2004 in Triple-A. Jennings and Chacon combined with Joe Kennedy, Byung-hyun Kim, and top prospect Jeff Francis to form the team's starting rotation. Other than Helton and Wilson, virtually all of the team's regular players were under the age of 30; the Rockies dubbed this group "Generation-R".

=== 2005 season ===
The result of all the moves was a 67–95 record in 2005, which tied for the worst record in franchise history, as the young players—many of whom had never been everyday players in the majors prior to that season—struggled. Helton and Wilson—virtually the only experienced players on the team—struggled as well; Helton hit just 20 homers, the fewest of his career, and missed the All-Star Game for the first time since 1999 and also went on the disabled list for the first time in his career. Wilson also spent time on the disabled list and, as the Rockies fell out of contention, was traded to the Washington Nationals. After starting the season 15–35, though, the team had some success later in the year, going a respectable 30–28 in August and September as the youngsters became more experienced. However, perhaps because of the trade of Walker and several consecutive losing seasons, the team fell all the way to fourteenth in the National League in attendance; for the first time in team history, the Rockies drew under 2 million fans for the season.

=== 2006 season ===
The 2006 season started with some promise; the Rockies were 44–43 in the first half of the season and were in contention in the NL West for much of the season. However, the team faded in the second half and wound up at 76–86, tied for fourth place in the division. Despite this, several of the young players showed promise. Matt Holliday hit 34 homers and was named to the All-Star Game; Garrett Atkins batted .329 and hit 29 homers. In addition, the pitching staff posted a 4.66 ERA—the best in team history—and starters Jason Jennings, Aaron Cook, and Jeff Francis had good seasons.

=== 2007: "Rocktober" and first World Series appearance ===
The Rockies trailed the Los Angeles Dodgers, the Arizona Diamondbacks and the San Diego Padres for most of 2007 Major League Baseball season; however by August, Colorado showed a steady series of wins, while the Division-leading Dodgers began to struggle.

By September, the Dodgers were eliminated by the Rockies from playoff contention, and the Diamondbacks were expected to clinch the National League West division title. The Padres held a steady lead on the National League wild card spot. The Diamondbacks eventually clinched the NL West division title, but the Rockies shot up with one of the greatest comebacks in baseball history. They were a major-league best 20–8 in September, after trailing 6 games on September 1. They won their last 14 of 15 games, including 11 in a row, the most of any team in the 2007 season and an all-time franchise record. The only loss during that streak was on September 28 to the Arizona Diamondbacks, a loss that clinched the Diamondbacks' playoff spot. Their 90–73 regular season mark set a franchise record. They also finished ahead of the Dodgers in the division for the first time in franchise history. Furthermore, Colorado set the single-season MLB record for fielding percentage by one team (.98925). Despite the Rockies record-setting performance, the National League coaches and players did not vote in any of Colorado's players for the NL Gold Glove award. The two most puzzling omissions were first baseman Todd Helton and shortstop Troy Tulowitzki. Both players had a better fielding percentage, more total chances, better zone rating, more putouts, more double plays turned, better range factor and more assists than their counterparts who won the award instead (Chicago Cubs first baseman Derrek Lee and Philadelphia Phillies shortstop Jimmy Rollins). Helton also had fewer errors (2) than Lee (7), while Tulowitzki had as many errors as Rollins (11), but did so on 834 total chances compared to Rollins' 717.

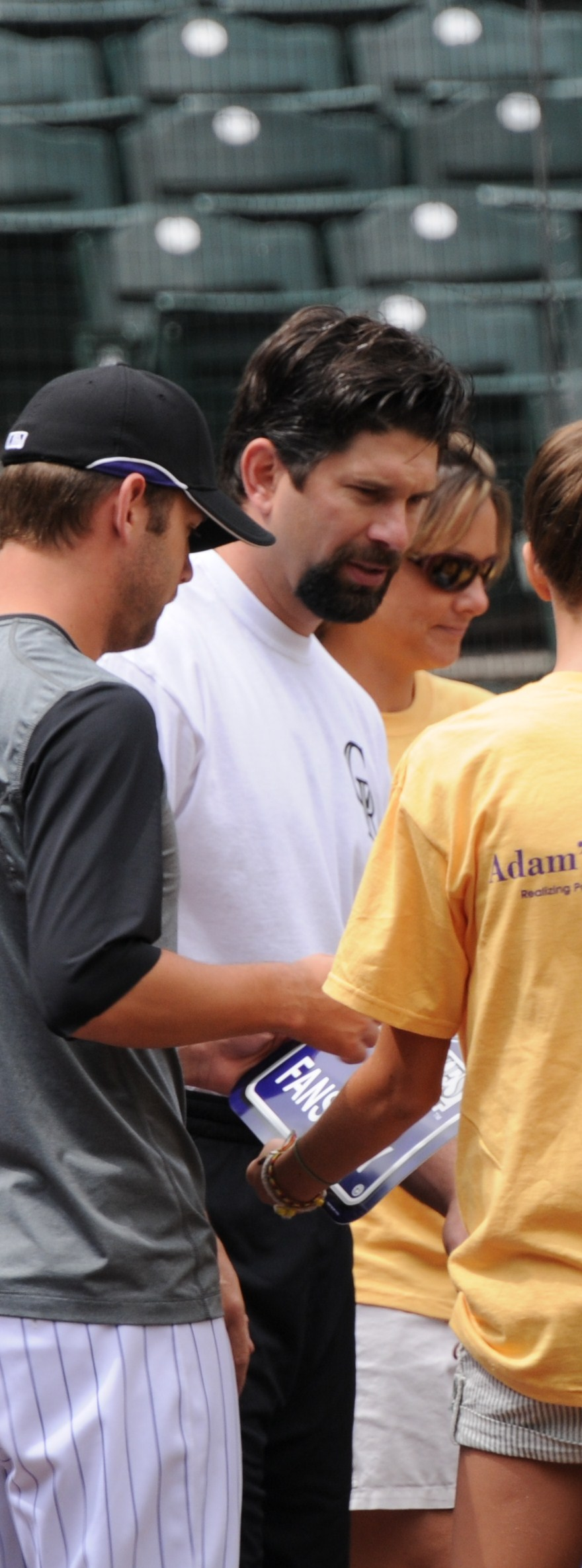
Former First baseman Todd Helton, who averaged .316 for his career

As a result of the Rockies' remarkable September run, the team finished the regular season tied with the Padres for the National League wild card spot in the playoffs. The two teams played a wild card tie-breaker game at Coors Field on October 1 to determine the wild card. A Colorado home run was called back early in the game despite the fact that it clearly cleared the fence, hit a chair, and bounced back onto the field. The game lasted 13 innings, and although the Padres got two runs off of a Scott Hairston home run in the top of the 13th inning to break a 6–6 tie, the Rockies came back in the bottom of the 13th by scoring three runs off of closer Trevor Hoffman to win 9–8. Second baseman Kazuo Matsui started off the inning by hitting a double. Tulowitzki followed with a double of his own, thus allowing Matsui to score. Left fielder Matt Holliday then came up to bat and hit a triple, scoring Tulowitzki. After an intentional walk to Helton, the Padres pitched to utility infielder Jamey Carroll, who then hit a sacrifice fly, allowing Holliday to score from third base. Holliday's winning run came off of a controversial slide in which home plate umpire Tim McClelland called Holliday safe, despite replays showing Holliday may have never touched the plate. McClelland educated the media and fans after the game as to the call: Padres catcher Michael Barrett blocked the plate before securing possession of the ball, resulting in an automatic ruling of safe and making Holliday's apparent failure to touch the plate irrelevant. The Rockies completed the fifth greatest regular season comeback in Major League Baseball history.

==== Playoffs ====
With the win, the Rockies made the playoffs for the first time since 1995, and went on to face the Philadelphia Phillies in the NLDS. Colorado won the first game in Philadelphia, 4–2. The Rockies also won the second game in Philadelphia, 10–5, with the help of Kazuo Matsui's 4th inning grand slam. On October 6, 2007, the Rockies completed a three-game sweep of the Phillies by winning 2–1 in Colorado. The three-game sweep was Colorado's first post-season series win in team history. The Rockies went on to play in the NLCS against the Arizona Diamondbacks, who swept their own NLDS against the Chicago Cubs. Colorado won the first two games of the NLCS against the Diamondbacks in Phoenix, then won their third game against the Diamondbacks in Denver on Sunday, October 14. That pushed the Rockies' combined late-season (September 16 and after) and post-season run to 20 wins and just 1 loss, the single loss coming against Arizona on September 28, 2007 – the 160th game of the regular season. This made Colorado only the third team in the last half-century, and the first in the National League since the 1936 New York Giants, to have a 20–1 stretch at any point of a season. The fourth game of the NLCS was won by the Rockies by a score of 6–4, completing a four-game sweep of Arizona. Holliday was named the NLCS MVP, as he hit .333 with two home runs and four RBIs during the series. The NLCS sweep earned the Rockies their first National League pennant in franchise history. The Rockies became the first team ever to sweep both the division series and league championship series in the same postseason. The club moved to 21–1 over all games played after September 15. By then, the amazing streak of wins became known among fans as "Rocktober". In the 2007 World Series, the Rockies faced the Boston Red Sox, and were swept in four games; the first game was 13–1, the second game was 2–1, the third game was 10–5, and the fourth and final game was 4–3. Some attribute the poor play in the World Series to the long lay off from the NLCS.

Baseball America named the Colorado Rockies the "Organization of the Year" for their accomplishments during the 2007 season. "We knew they were bringing great talent through their farm system, but we certainly didn't expect it to pay off with big-league success so quickly", said Will Lingo, editor of Baseball America. "They won with homegrown players, have more talent on the way and have maintained stability in their front office, so they had pretty much everything we look for in an organization."

=== 2008: Defending the National League crown ===
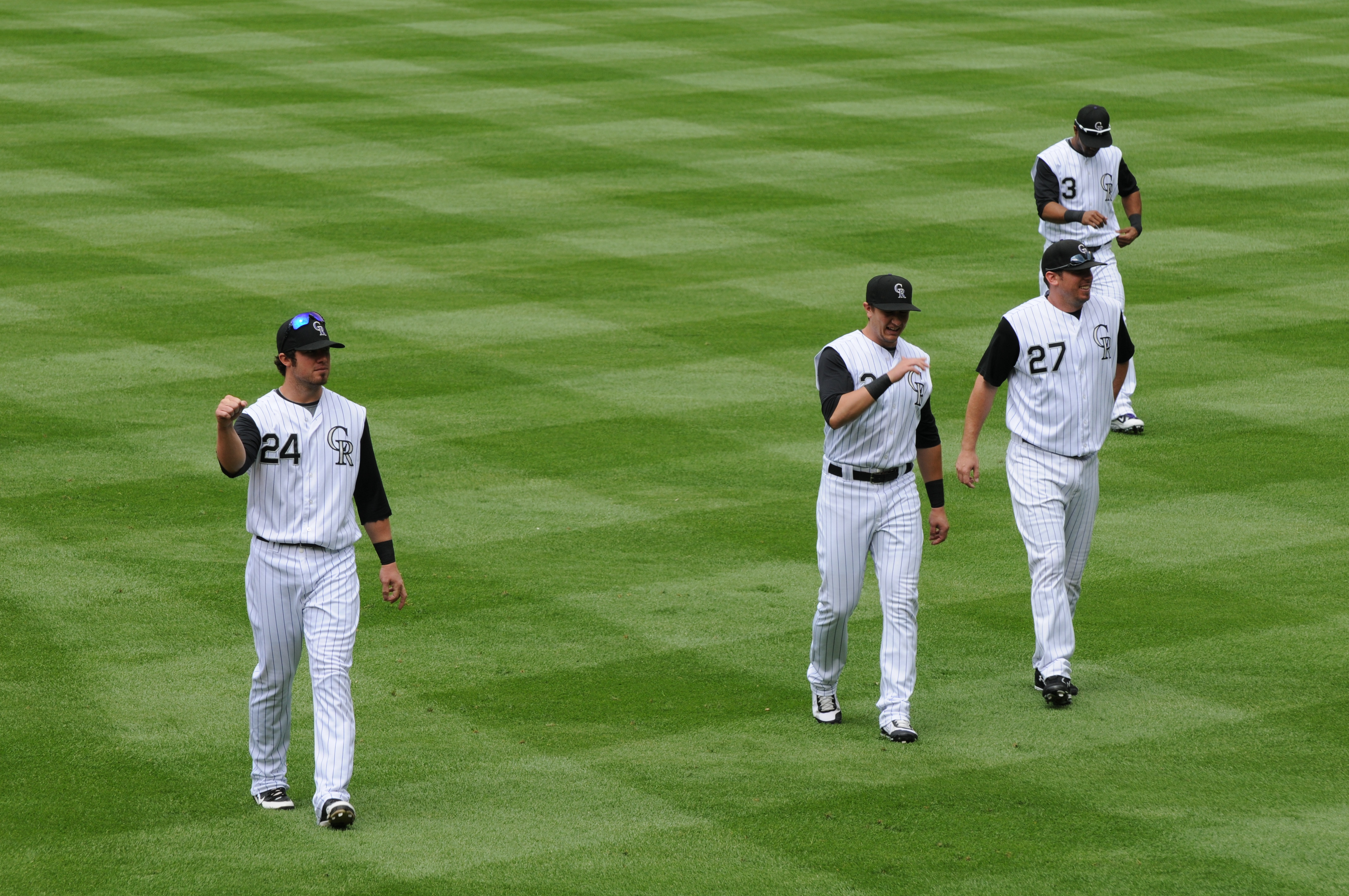
Some of the starters of the 2008 season: Ian Stewart, Troy Tulowitzki, Garrett Atkins and Willy Taveras

The Colorado Rockies began the 2008 season after few offseason changes from the National League champion squad of 2007. Major losses were all to free agency (second baseman Kaz Matsui went to the Houston Astros and pitcher Josh Fogg went to the Cincinnati Reds). The Rockies season was scheduled to begin on March 31 against the St. Louis Cardinals at St. Louis, however, the game was rescheduled to the next day because of foul weather. Colorado began the season on a high note, winning their opener on April 1, in a 2–1 comeback victory over the Cardinals.

On April 17, 2008, Colorado beat the San Diego Padres, 2–1, in a 22-inning road game that spanned 6 hours and 16 minutes. It was the longest game in Rockies history, in terms of both total innings and total length of time. 659 total pitches were thrown in the game by 15 different pitchers (eight Rockies pitchers and seven Padres pitchers). The 22-inning affair was the longest since August 31, 1993, when the Minnesota Twins, at home, defeated the Cleveland Indians, 5–4, in 22 innings.

On July 1, 2008, the Rockies defeated the San Diego Padres, 4–0, in the shortest nine-inning game in Coors Field history – one hour and 58 minutes.

On July 4, 2008, Colorado defeated the Florida Marlins, 18–17, after at one point being down, 13–4. The nine-run deficit that the Rockies overcame made it the largest comeback win in team history.

The Rockies ended the season finishing third in the National League West with a 74–88 record, failing to make the playoffs. The team got rid of hitting coach Alan Cockrell, third base coach Mike Gallego and bench coach Jamie Quirk after the disappointing season. The Rockies also traded away Matt Holliday to the Oakland Athletics for pitchers Huston Street and Greg Smith, and outfielder Carlos González.

=== 2009: The Jim Tracy era and a return to the playoffs ===
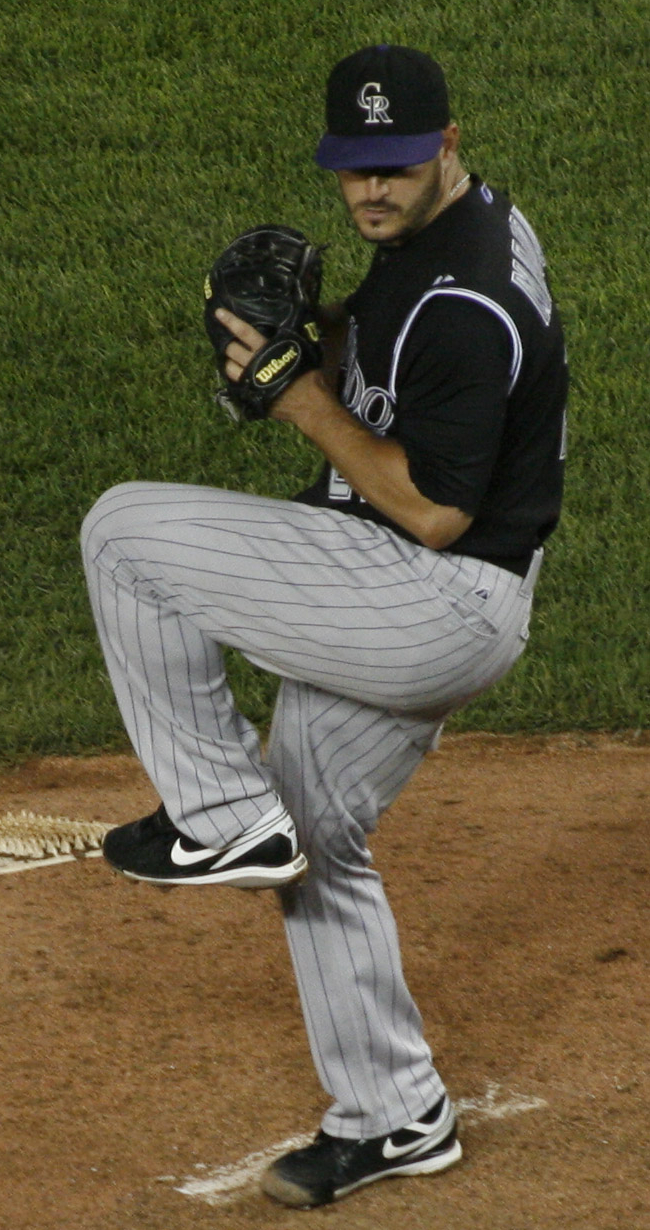
Jason Marquis

After a poor start (19–28) to the 2009 season, Clint Hurdle was fired on May 29. His successor as manager was Jim Tracy, who was originally hired as bench coach for the Colorado Rockies in November 2008. In June 2009, the team rapidly improved and by the end of June, the Rockies set a franchise record for victories in a month with 21 in a 28-game stretch (one win better than the September 2007 Rocktober run). This improved their record from 20 to 29 and nine games under .500, to 41–36 and 5 games over .500. During June, the Rockies led all of major league baseball with 151 total runs. The Rockies had two players selected to the All-Star Game: right fielder Brad Hawpe and starting pitcher Jason Marquis. On August 10, Troy Tulowitzki hit the team's 5th franchise cycle. He became the second player in major league history to hit for the cycle and have an unassisted triple play, which he did on April 29, 2007, in his career.

On August 24, the Rockies faced the San Francisco Giants in what ended up being a 14 inning game which lasted close to 5 hours(4:57), the second longest game in Rockies history. After multiple scoreless innings, the Giants managed to score three runs in the top of the 14th to place them ahead of the Rockies, 4–1. After several Colorado at-bats, the bases were loaded and Ryan Spilborghs stepped up to the plate. Spilborghs hit the first walk-off grand slam in Rockies history, his second career grand slam, and his first walk-off homer in the 14th inning to squeak by the Giants, 6–4, Monday in front of about half of the 27,670 fans who remained at Coors Field. The play has since been dubbed "SpillySlam".

This particular win expanded the Rockies' Wild Card lead to four games over Giants. In an ecstatic interview after the game, Jim Tracy stated that he told the Rockies' preceding batter, relief pitcher Adam Eaton, not to swing: "Even if Miller threw three balls down the Middle, take the strikeout because I wanted Spilly to get a chance to hit." The strategy worked in the Rockies' favor; Eaton walked with the bases loaded, scoring Dexter Fowler to cut the Giants' lead to 4–2.

Following the win, Colorado hosted Los Angeles with a chance to pull into a tie for the division lead if they could sweep. On August 25, the Rockies won 5–4 on another walk-off thanks to Troy Tulowitzki's bases loaded, one out single in the bottom of the 10th. However, Los Angeles, won the next two games, and with their wild card lead down to 3 games, the Rockies traveled to San Francisco for another 3-game set. After losing each of the first two games by two runs, the Rockies opened up a 5–2 lead against Matt Cain in the finale of the series on August 30. But with two outs and the bases loaded in the 7th, in a scene eerily similar to the Ryan Spilborghs walk-off, Édgar Rentería hit a go-ahead grand slam off of Rafael Betancourt, propelling the Giants to a 9–5 win and a tie in the Wild Card standings entering September.

Colorado responded by winning 10 of their first 11 games in September, including a 9–1 home stand. When they returned to San Francisco for their final series with the Giants on September 14, the Rockies had once again built a large Wild Card lead. But as in the previous series, San Francisco won the first two games behind Tim Lincecum and Barry Zito, cutting the Rockies wild card lead to 2.5 games. In a pivotal swing game that could have had the Rockies leave San Francisco with either a 1.5 game lead or a 3.5 game lead, Colorado once again built a large lead against Matt Cain in the finale of the series on September 16. Thanks to 8 brilliant innings from Jorge de la Rosa, and home runs from Troy Tulowitzki and Ian Stewart, the Rockies took a 4–0 lead into the bottom of the 9th. With closer Huston Street injured, the Rockies turned to Franklin Morales, but the Giants started the inning with 3 straight hits to pull to within 4–1. Rafael Betancourt was summoned once again, and induced a ground ball off Juan Uribe's bat. However, an errant throw by Tulowitzki sailed past Clint Barmes and into right field, scoring another run and putting runners at 1st and 3rd. Pinch runner Eugenio Vélez then stole second base, putting the tying run in scoring position. In a rematch of their August match-up, Betancourt got Édgar Rentería to pop out on the infield for the first out. However, pinch hitter Randy Winn followed with an RBI groundout, cutting the deficit to 4–3 and moving the tying run to 3rd. With a full count, Betancourt struck out pinch hitter Nate Schierholtz to secure the save.

As the Giants began to fade, the Atlanta Braves started making a run at the Rockies that was starting to look similar to Colorado's 2007 run. From September 8 through September 28, the Braves won 16 of 19 to pull from nearly 7 back to just 2 back in the season's final week. It took several dramatic wins for Colorado to hang on to its lead. On September 25, the Rockies played host to the St. Louis Cardinals. With Aaron Cook returning from an injury, the Rockies won 2–1 in the bottom of the 9th on a Yorvit Torrealba sacrifice fly. Two days later, the Rockies took a 4–3 lead into the bottom of the 9th. Back from injury, Huston Street attempted to close out a two inning save, but got into a jam. The Cardinals put runners on the corners with one out for Ryan Ludwick. Ludwick flared a flyball into shallow right. Rockies second baseman Clint Barmes, playing in, made a miraculous over the shoulder diving catch after a long run, and doubled off Albert Pujols, who thought the ball was going to drop and was nearly at third base, to end the game. Much like the 2007 play-in game when it was not clear whether or not Matt Holliday had touched home plate with the game-winning run, there was question as to whether Barmes actually caught the ball, as photos later emerged showing the ball apparently sliding down his arm as he went to the ground. Ironically, Holliday, traded from Oakland to St. Louis in July, was in the opposing dugout watching the play.

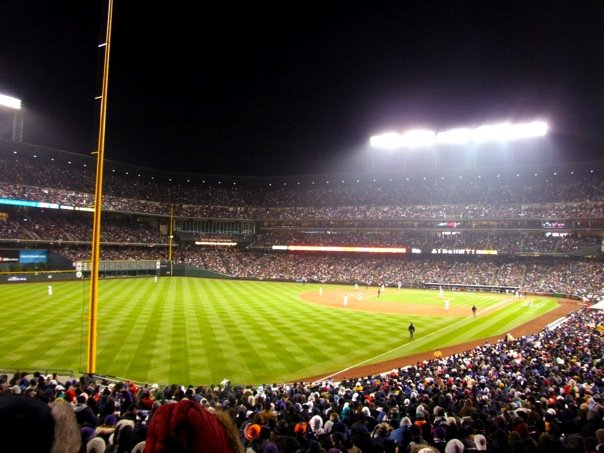
Coors Field during Game 3 of the NLDS

On September 29, their lead down to 2 games and their magic number at 5, the Rockies opened their final home series against Milwaukee. During the game, Atlanta had their 7-game win streak snapped by Florida 5–4, meaning the Rockies could reduce their magic number to 3 with a win. Colorado built a 5–2 lead and turned the ball to Street. However, with one out and two on, Street blew his first save of the season, allowing a game-tying home run to Jason Kendall. In the bottom of the 11th, Chris Iannetta pinch hit with the winning run on first. Seldom used and having batted only 12 times in the month, Iannetta hit a 3–2 pitch from David Weathers deep to right field for a walk-off 2-run home run, propelling Colorado to a 7–5 win. The win combined with the Braves loss seemed to once again shift momentum. The Braves lost again the following night, and the Rockies 10–6 win set their magic number at 1.

On October 1, the Rockies beat the Milwaukee Brewers 9–2, completing a season sweep of the Brewers and clinching the Rockies' second playoff appearance in three years. The victory also marked the club's 91st win of the season, breaking the franchise record set in 2007. The team broke its record of 22 games over .500 in this victory also. Despite making the race very close, in the 161st game of the season, the Dodgers snapped their five-game losing streak – and the Rockies' five-game winning streak – to clinch the West title. The Rockies entered the playoffs against the Philadelphia Phillies as the NL Wild Card for the second time in three years. They lost to the Phillies 3–1 in the NLDS.

=== 2010 ===
On April 17, Ubaldo Jiménez pitched the first no-hitter in franchise history against the Atlanta Braves. Keli McGregor, President of the Rockies, was found dead on April 20, 2010; it was later revealed that he had died of a rare occurrence of viral myocarditis. On May 24, Kazuo Matsui, former Rockies second baseman during the 2007 championship season, was resigned to the club following his unconditional release from the Houston Astros. The Rockies placed Matsui in the Triple-A Colorado Springs Sky Sox minor league team. On July 6, the Rockies were losing 9–3 in the 9th inning against the visiting St. Louis Cardinals, when the Rockies stormed back for 9 runs in the inning. Rockies Chris Iannetta and Seth Smith each hit 3-run home runs off of closer Ryan Franklin, with Smith's homer being a walk-off home run. It is currently the largest 9th inning come-from-behind victory in franchise history. On July 30, the Rockies hit an MLB record-setting 11 consecutive hits against the Chicago Cubs. The Rockies sent 18 batters to the plate and score 12 runs, eventually beating the Cubs by a score of 17–2. The hit streak consisted of four singles, four doubles, two home runs and a triple. The Rockies also broke a franchise record with 13 hits in a single inning.

Rockies ended the season with a total record of 83–79 (finishing 3rd overall) by losing 13 of its last 14 games after getting close to 2–3 wins from the NL West leader at one point at almost the end of the season.

=== 2011 ===
After a 17–8 start to the season in April, the Rockies went 8–21 in May and struggled the rest of the year, finishing in fourth place with a record of 73–89. Jorge de la Rosa was lost for the season due to Tommy John Surgery and did not return until the end of the 2012 season. On July 30 with the team out of contention, the Rockies traded Ubaldo Jiménez to the Cleveland Indians for Alex White, Matt McBride, and Drew Pomeranz.

=== 2012 ===
On April 17, Jamie Moyer became the oldest pitcher in MLB history to record a win. Troy Tulowitzki suffered a season-ending groin injury in late May. The Rockies finished the year with a 64–98 record, the worst in franchise history. At the end of the season, Jim Tracy resigned as manager and was replaced by Walt Weiss.

=== 2013 ===
The Rockies surprised in early 2013, starting the season 13–4, and remaining around the .500 mark through the end of June. Michael Cuddyer had a franchise record 27-game hitting streak. However, both Troy Tulowitzki and Carlos Gonzalez missed time with injuries. The club faded in the second half of season, finishing in last place at 74–88. Towards the end of the season, Todd Helton announced his retirement after a 17-year career, playing his final home game on September 24. Gonzalez and rookie third baseman Nolan Arenado both received Gold Gloves at the end of the season.

=== 2014 ===
Early in the season, Nolan Arenado broke Michael Cuddyer's franchise record hit streak by hitting safely in 28 straight games. Like 2013, the Rockies started the season surprisingly well at 22–14. After that point, the Rockies began to fade quickly as bad pitching and injuries began to take their toll. Tulowitzki and Gonzalez both suffered season ending injuries in July. The Rockies ultimately finished 66–96, in fourth place.

On August 17, the Rockies officially retired Todd Helton's number. After the season, both Dan O'Dowd and Bill Geivett resigned from their front office roles and were replaced by Jeff Bridich.

=== 2015 ===
The 2015 Rockies once again finished in last place at 68–94, as Troy Tulowitzki was traded to the Blue Jays shortly before the July trade deadline.

=== 2016 ===
After staying close to the .500 mark most of the season and even posting a 54–53 (.505) record on August 3, the Rockies went an MLB-worst 21–34 the rest of the season to finish in third place with a record of 75–87. Following the season, Walt Weiss was not retained as the team's manager and was replaced by Bud Black.

=== 2017 ===
With the aim of contending in 2017, the Rockies signed free agents Greg Holland and Ian Desmond.

The 2017 season saw the Rockies sprint to a 47–26 record and first place in the division by June 20. Though the team cooled off significantly afterwards, they still managed to finish in third place with an 87–75 record, their first winning season since 2010 and good enough for the National League's second Wild Card. The season ended with an 11–8 loss to the division rival Diamondbacks in the 2017 National League Wild Card Game.

=== 2018 ===
Looking to build on the previous year, the Rockies spent significant money on their bullpen, signing relievers Wade Davis and Bryan Shaw to multi-year contracts.

The team suffered from inconsistent play and bullpen struggles throughout the first three months, falling to 38–42 with a loss to the Giants on June 27. Following that, the team immediately began to turn things around, going 53–29 the rest of the season. The Rockies entered September battling with the Dodgers and Diamondbacks for the division title. The Rockies clinched a playoff spot on September 28, marking the first back-to-back postseason appearances for the team. However the Rockies would lose to the Dodgers in the 2018 National League West tie-breaker game, finishing at 91–72, their best mark since 2009 and in the second Wild Card position. The Rockies' 44–38 road record was also the best mark in franchise history.

The Rockies defeated the Chicago Cubs 2–1 in 13 innings in the 2018 National League Wild Card Game, with Kyle Freeland recording the first ever scoreless postseason start by a Rockies pitcher. The Rockies' season ended after being swept by the Milwaukee Brewers in the 2018 National League Division Series.

=== 2019 ===
The Rockies experienced a major loss with the departure of All-Star second baseman DJ LeMahieu to the New York Yankees.

The Rockies started the 2019 season off badly, losing 12 of their first 15 games. They rebounded for a while, being as many as six games over .500 in mid-June, but soon fell down a rockslide and went 15–38 in July and August. They finished the season in fourth place with a 71–91 record.

=== 2020 ===
In the pandemic-shortened 2020 season, the Rockies went 26–34 and again finished fourth in the National League West. In the subsequent offseason, the Rockies traded All-Star third baseman Nolan Arenado, who had a number of disputes with the organization after signing a 10-year extension in the 2019 off-season, to the St. Louis Cardinals for Austin Gomber and four minor league prospects; the team would also pay $50 million to cover a portion of the remaining payment on the contract.

=== 2021 ===
The Rockies placed fourth in the NL West for the third straight year in 2021, finishing with a 74–87 record.

=== 2022 ===
In 2022, the Rockies finished last in the NL West for the first time since 2015, posting a 68–94 record.

=== 2023 ===
The Rockies posted the worst record in franchise history in 2023, finishing 59–103.

== Controversies ==
=== 2006 controversy over Christian rules ===
On June 1, 2006, USA Today reported that Rockies management, including manager Clint Hurdle, had instituted an explicitly Christian code of conduct for the team's players, banning men's magazines (such as Maxim and Playboy) and sexually explicit music from the team's clubhouse. The newspaper reported:

Behind the scenes, [the Rockies] quietly have become an organization guided by Christianity – open to other religious beliefs but embracing a Christian-based code of conduct they believe will bring them focus and success. From ownership on down, it's an approach the Rockies are proud of – and something they are wary about publicizing. "We're nervous, to be honest with you", Rockies general manager Dan O'Dowd says. "It's the first time we ever talked about these issues publicly. The last thing we want to do is offend anyone because of our beliefs."

The article sparked controversy, including criticism in a column from The Nation, where Dave Zirin stated:

San Francisco Giants first baseman-outfielder Mark Sweeney, who spent 2003 and 2004 with the Rockies, said, "You wonder if some people are going along with it just to keep their jobs. Look, I pray every day. I have faith. It's always been part of my life. But I don't want something forced on me. Do they really have to check to see whether I have a Playboy in my locker?"

Soon after the USA Today article appeared, The Denver Post published an article featuring many Rockies players contesting the claims made in the USA Today article. Former Rockies pitcher Jason Jennings said:

[The article in USA Today] was just bad. I am not happy at all. Some of the best teammates I have ever had are the furthest thing from Christian", Jennings said. "You don't have to be a Christian to have good character. They can be separate. [The article] was misleading.

=== 2007 World Series ticket controversy ===
On October 17, 2007, a week before the first game of the 2007 World Series against the Boston Red Sox, the Colorado Rockies announced that tickets were to be available to the general public via online sales only, despite prior arrangements to sell the tickets at local retail outlets. Five days later on October 22, California-based ticket vendor Paciolan, Inc., the sole contractor authorized by the Colorado Rockies to distribute tickets, was forced to suspend sales after less than an hour due to an overwhelming number of attempts to purchase tickets.

An official release from the baseball organization claimed that they were the victims of a denial of service attack. These claims, however, were unsubstantiated and neither the Rockies nor Paciolan have sought investigation into the matter. The United States Federal Bureau of Investigation started its own investigation into the claims. Ticket sales resumed the next day, with all three home games selling out within two and a half hours.
