= Bo Bichette =

American baseball player (born 1998)

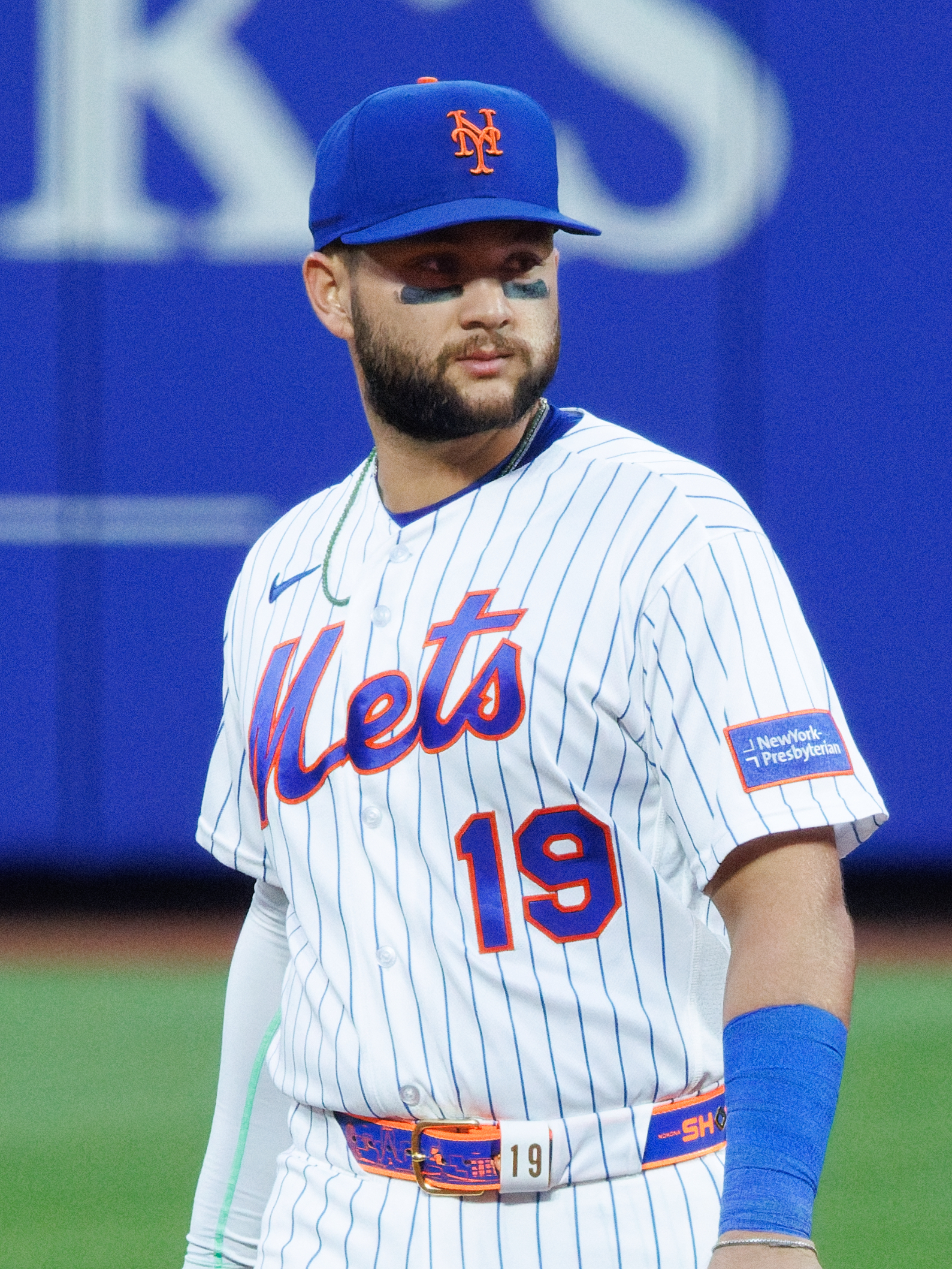
- Bichette with the New York Mets in 2026

New York Mets – No. 19
- Infielder
- Born: March 5, 1998 (age 28); Orlando, Florida, U.S.
- Bats: Right Throws: Right

MLB debut
- July 29, 2019, for the Toronto Blue Jays

MLB statistics (through 2026 season)
- Batting average: .288
- Hits: 1,070
- Home runs: 129
- Runs batted in: 515
- Stats at Baseball Reference

Teams
- Toronto Blue Jays (2019–2025); New York Mets (2026–present)

Career highlights and awards
- 2× All-Star (2021, 2023); 2× AL hit leader (2021, 2022)

Bo Joseph Bichette (/ˈbɪˈʃɛt/; born March 5, 1998) is an American professional baseball infielder for the New York Mets of Major League Baseball (MLB). He has previously played in MLB for the Toronto Blue Jays. Bichette was selected by the Blue Jays in the second round of the 2016 MLB draft and made his MLB debut with them in 2019. He is a two-time MLB All-Star and twice led the American League (AL) in hits. His father, Dante Bichette, also played in MLB.

== Early life, family, and amateur career ==
Bichette was born in Orlando, Florida on March 5, 1998. He is the son of four-time MLB All-Star outfielder Dante Bichette and Mariana Bichette. His mother Mariana is a native of Porto Alegre, Brazil. His maternal grandfather is of Chinese descent. He has an older brother named Dante Bichette Jr. Bichette is named after Bo Jackson.

Bichette was home schooled through Laurel Springs School, an NCAA-approved, accredited online school; however, he competed in baseball for Lakewood High School in St. Petersburg, Florida. As a senior, he batted .569 with 13 home runs. Bichette was named the Gatorade/USA Today Florida Player of the Year and Florida's Mr. Baseball. Bichette committed to attend Arizona State University to play college baseball for the Arizona State Sun Devils.

== Professional career ==
=== Draft and minor leagues ===
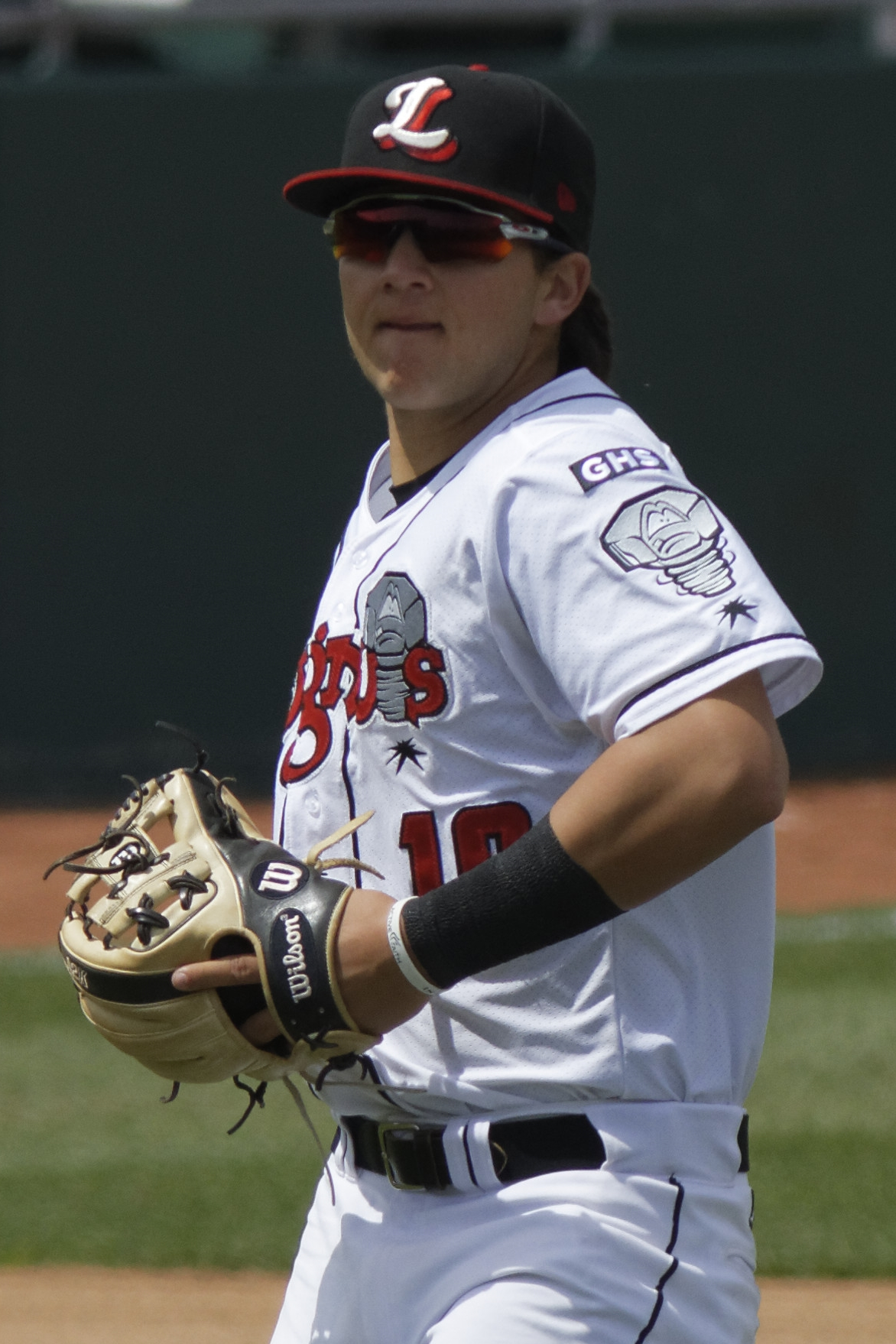
Bichette with the Lansing Lugnuts in 2017

The Toronto Blue Jays selected Bichette in the second round of the 2016 MLB draft. He said afterward that he turned down "about four offers" during the draft in order to go to Toronto. He signed there for a $1.1 million bonus on June 17. After opening the season with a .431 batting average through 18 games with the Gulf Coast League Blue Jays, Bichette was placed on the 7-day injured list after experiencing an injury to his midsection, which was later determined to be a ruptured appendix. He returned to the lineup shortly before the end of the season, and finished the year with a .427 batting average, four home runs, and 36 runs batted in (RBI) in 22 games. Despite missing more than half of the season with injury, Bichette was named the Gulf Coast League's end-of-season All-Star at shortstop on September 13. During the offseason, he represented Brazil at the 2017 World Baseball Classic – Qualifier 4.

Bichette was assigned to the Class-A Lansing Lugnuts to begin the 2017 season. On June 7, he was named a Midwest League All-Star. To that point in the season, Bichette led the league in batting average, hits, runs scored, slugging percentage, and on-base plus slugging percentage (OPS). Bichette raised his batting average to an even .400 after a 7-for-8 performance in a doubleheader against the South Bend Cubs on June 15. On June 29, he was named to the U.S. roster for the 2017 All-Star Futures Game. On July 6, Bichette was named the Midwest League Player of the Month for June. Later that day, the Blue Jays announced he would be promoted to the Advanced-A Dunedin Blue Jays after the All-Star Futures Game. Bichette was named the Midwest League's Most Valuable Player (MVP), Prospect of the Year, and a Postseason All-Star on August 18 after hitting .384/.448/.623 with 32 doubles (2nd in the Midwest League), 10 home runs, and 51 RBIs in 70 games for Lansing. For Dunedin, Bichette appeared in 40 games and hit .323 with four home runs, 23 RBI, and 10 stolen bases. His combined .362 batting average led all of Minor League Baseball, and made him the first teenager to lead the minors in hitting since Gil Torres did so in 1963. On October 5, 2017, MLB named Bichette Toronto's Minor League Hitter of the Year.

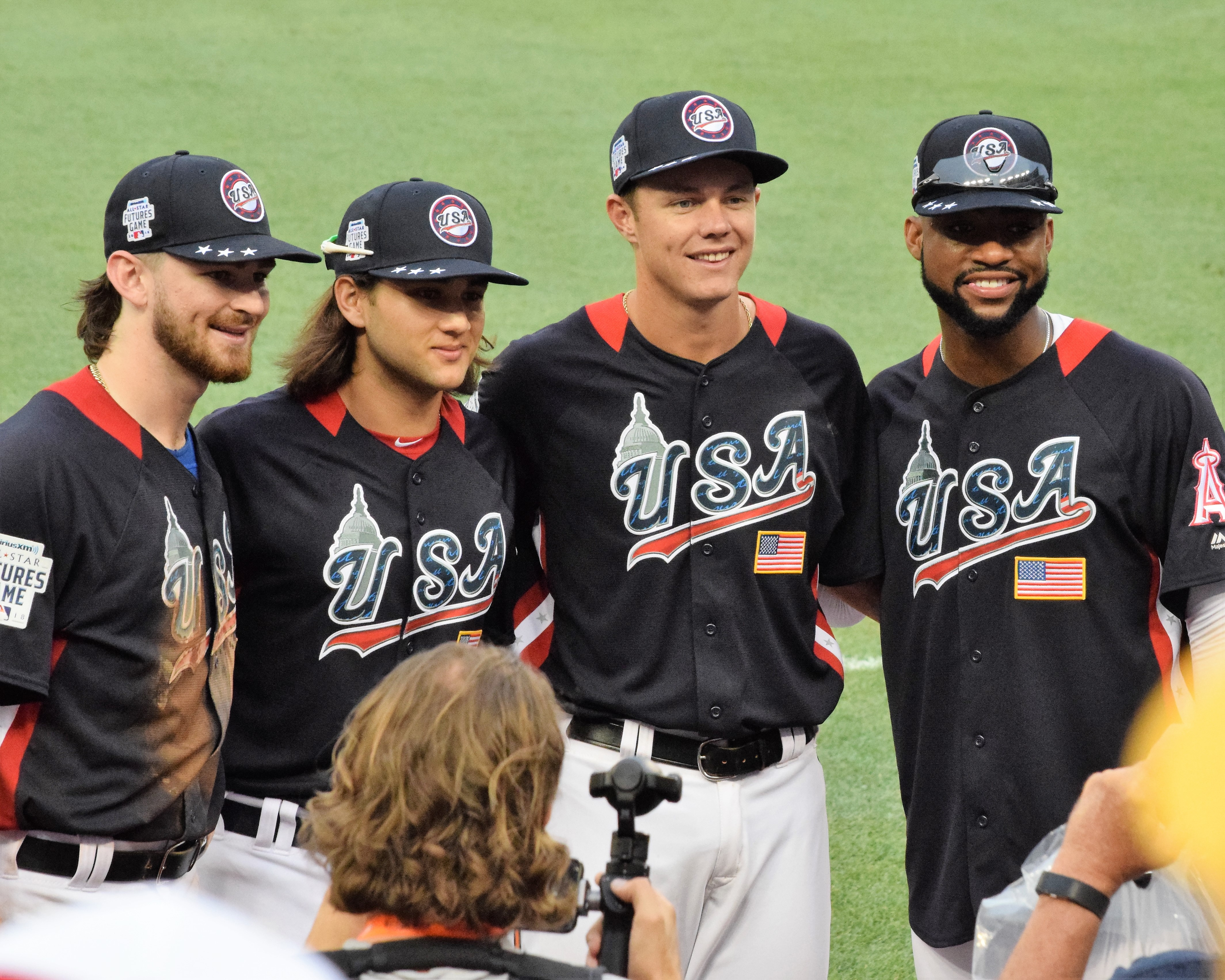
Bichette (second from left) with Brendan Rodgers, Ryan Mountcastle and Jo Adell at the 2018 All-Star Futures Game

In 2018, Bichette started the season with the Double-A New Hampshire Fisher Cats. He appeared in 131 games and batted .286 with 95 runs (leading the Eastern League), 43 doubles (leading the league), 7 triples (tied for the league lead), 11 home runs, 74 RBIs (tied for 3rd), 48 walks (9th), and 32 stolen bases (2nd).

Bichette began the 2019 season with the Triple-A Buffalo Bisons. On April 22, he was hit on the left hand by a pitch and later diagnosed with a broken hand.

=== Toronto Blue Jays (2019–2025) ===
==== 2019 ====
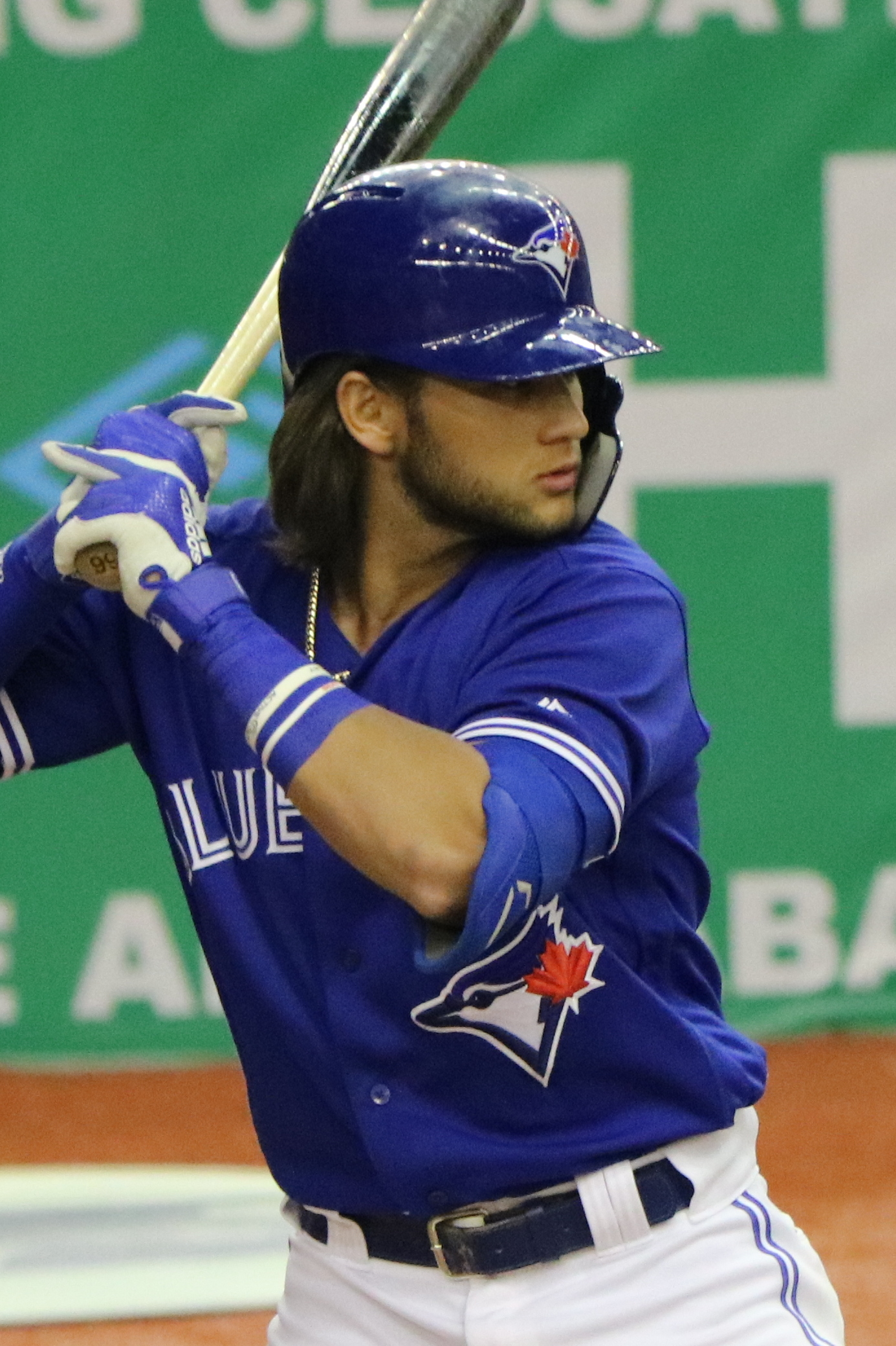
Bichette with the Blue Jays in 2019

On July 29, 2019, the Blue Jays selected Bichette's contract and promoted him to the major leagues. On that day, he recorded his first major league hit, a single against Brad Keller of the Kansas City Royals, on the second major league pitch he saw. On July 31, Bichette recorded three hits against the Royals, the second of which was his first MLB home run. On August 6, Bichette became the first MLB player to hit 10 extra base hits in his first nine major league games with a double against the Tampa Bay Rays. After hitting another double on August 7, Bichette joined Yadier Molina and Derrek Lee as the only players in the live-ball era to record a double in eight straight games and broke the Blue Jays franchise record set by Carlos Delgado in 2000. Playing in Toronto for the first time the following day, Bichette extended his doubles streak to nine games, setting a new MLB record. He also set a new MLB record in extra-base hits in the first 11 games of his career with 13. He is the first rookie with 9 straight games with extra-base hits since Ted Williams in 1939. Bichette set franchise records with 20 hits and an 11-game hit streak with a 1.316 OPS during the 11-game span. He finished the season hitting .311 with 11 home runs in 46 games.

==== 2020 ====
Overall with the Jays during the Covid-shortened 2020 season, Bichette batted .301 with five home runs and 23 RBIs in 29 games.

==== 2021 ====
On July 4, 2021, Bichette was named an All-Star for the first time. At the time of his nomination, Bichette had a slash line of .290/.340/.529, with 15 home runs and 54 RBI. Bichette finished the 2021 season batting .298/.343/.484 with 29 home runs, 102 RBIs and 25 stolen bases. He led the American League with 191 hits, while defensively he led the league with 24 errors.

==== 2022 ====
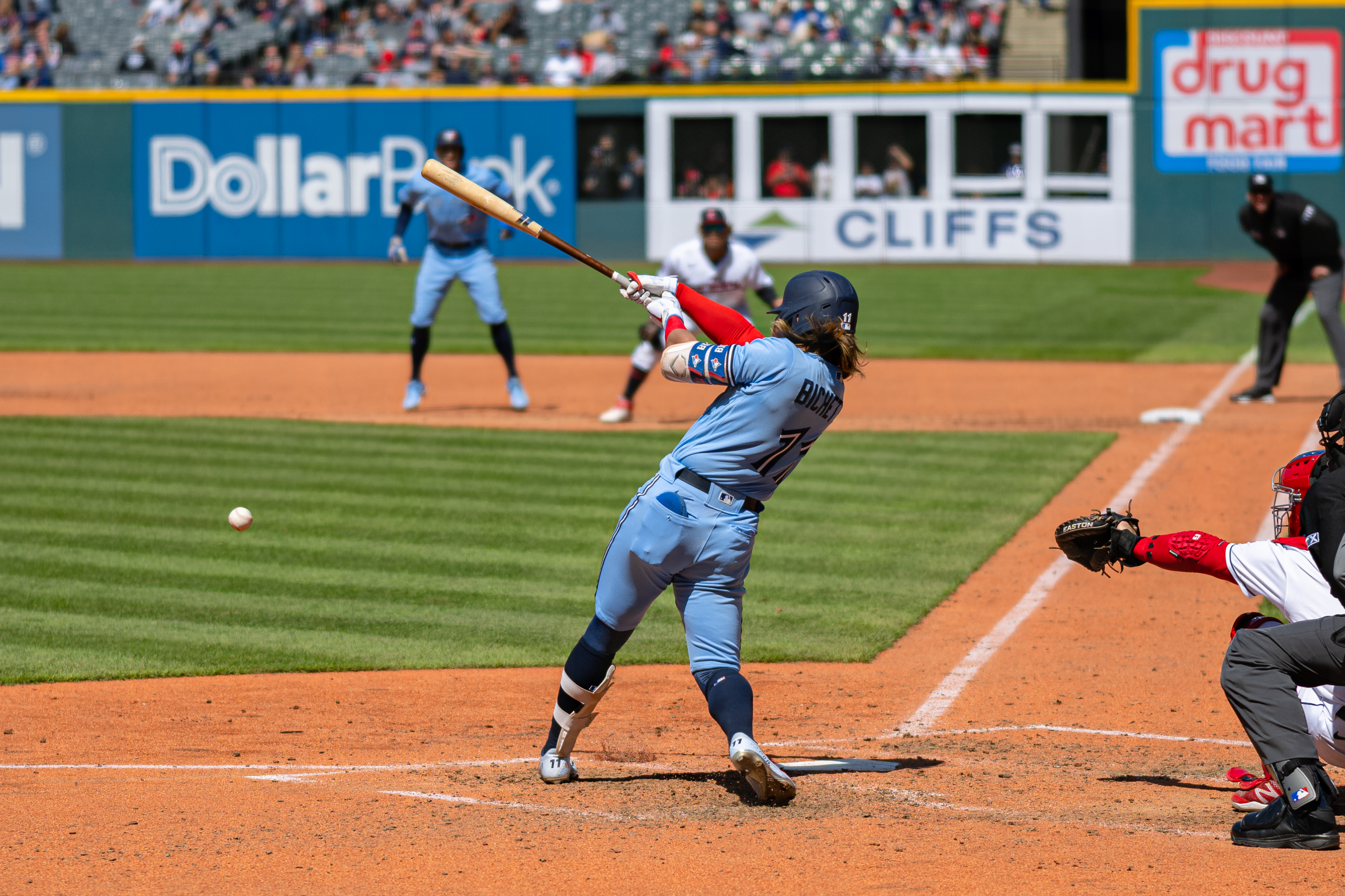
Bichette batting in May 2022

On September 5, 2022, Bichette had a 3-home run game in a game against the Baltimore Orioles. In doing so, he also made history with teammate Vladimir Guerrero Jr., in which they were the first pair of teammates to have a 3-home run game in the same season, and both have fathers who played in MLB. He finished the 2022 season with a .290/.333/.469 slash line, 24 home runs, 93 RBI, and led the majors in foul balls hit, with 587.

==== 2023 ====
Bichette led the American League in hits in both 2021 and 2022, with 191 and 189, respectively. On April 14, 2023, he recorded the 500th hit of his MLB career in his 407th game, surpassing the previous franchise record held by Vernon Wells and Shannon Stewart, who needed 432 games to reach the milestone. In 2023, he batted .306/.339/.475, had 175 hits (4th in the AL), and led AL batters in line drive percentage (27.4%) and percentage of balls hit to the opposite field (40.6%).

==== 2024 ====
In 2024, Bichette batted .225/.277/.322, had 70 hits, 4 HRs, and 31 RBI.

==== 2025 ====
On May 31, 2025, Bichette recorded his 100th home run of his career against the Athletics, becoming the first Blue Jay shortstop to reach the milestone in franchise history.

Bichette injured the posterior cruciate ligament in his left knee on September 6 and missed the rest of the regular season. He returned to the Blue Jays' lineup in the 2025 World Series as the second baseman, his first MLB appearance at the position. He launched a 3-run home run off the Dodgers' pitcher Shohei Ohtani in the 3rd inning of Game 7 of the World Series, but that was not enough, as his team ultimately lost Game 7 and the World Series. Following the World Series, Bichette became a free agent on November 5.

=== New York Mets (2026–present) ===
On January 20, 2026, Bichette signed a three-year, $126 million contract with the New York Mets. The deal included opt outs after the first and second year. The Mets announced that he would primarily play third base.

On July 7, Bichette notched his 1,000th career hit, a single to center field off of Kansas City Royals pitcher Seth Lugo in the bottom of the first inning. On August 17, Bichette recorded his 500th career RBI, a single off of San Diego Padres pitcher Walker Buehler that brought home A.J. Ewing in the bottom of the first inning. Across 160 games for the Mets in 2026, Bichette batted .260/.312/.390 with 166 hits, 18 home runs, and 78 RBI.

== International career ==
Bichette has represented Brazil in the 2016 World Baseball Classic Qualifiers.

In May 2025, after Brazil qualified for the 2026 World Baseball Classic, Bichette committed to the team for the tournament. He was slated to play alongside his brother Dante Bichette Jr. However, Bichette withdrew from the team in early January 2026 — two months before the tournament — citing his desire to focus on transitioning to third base with his new club, the New York Mets.

== Player profile ==
Bichette is a skilled contact hitter with very good hand-eye coordination. He can generate great bat speed and power. According to Joe Siddall, he does this "by separating and delaying torso rotation after the foot hits the floor after the leg kick, exposing his back plate surname and number, before uncoiling, with the bat at the same angle as his shoulders. When facing a strikeout or pay-off pitch (X-2 or 3–2), he replaces the leg kick with the left knee bowing inwards." Bichette has a reputation as a below-average fielder at the shortstop position.

== Personal life ==
Bichette is a Christian.

In January 2026, Bichette married his longtime partner, Alexis.

== See also ==
- List of people from Orlando, Florida
- List of second-generation Major League Baseball players
