= Dante Bichette =

American baseball player & coach (born 1963)

- Outfielder
- Born: November 18, 1963 (age 62); West Palm Beach, Florida, U.S.
- Batted: Right Threw: Right

MLB debut
- September 5, 1988, for the California Angels

Last MLB appearance
- October 6, 2001, for the Boston Red Sox

MLB statistics
- Batting average: .299
- Home runs: 274
- Runs batted in: 1,141
- Stats at Baseball Reference

Teams
- As player: California Angels (1988–1990); Milwaukee Brewers (1991–1992); Colorado Rockies (1993–1999); Cincinnati Reds (2000); Boston Red Sox (2000–2001); As coach: Colorado Rockies (2013)

Career highlights and awards
- 4× All-Star (1994–1996, 1998); Silver Slugger Award (1995); NL home run leader (1995); NL RBI leader (1995)

Alphonse Dante Bichette Sr. (/ˈdɑːnteɪ bɪˈʃɛt/; born November 18, 1963) is an American former professional baseball player. He played in Major League Baseball (MLB) as an outfielder for the California Angels (1988–1990), Milwaukee Brewers (1991–1992), Colorado Rockies (1993–1999), Cincinnati Reds (2000), and Boston Red Sox (2000–2001). He was also the hitting coach for the Rockies in 2013. He batted and threw right-handed.

Bichette was a four-time All-Star as a member of the Rockies, and was a member of the 1993 inaugural team. In 1995, he won the Silver Slugger Award and finished second in the Most Valuable Player Award (MVP) voting while leading the National League in home runs, slugging percentage, and total bases, along with leading the entire MLB in hits and runs batted in (RBIs). The next year, he joined the 30–30 club with 31 home runs and 31 stolen bases, and in 1998, again led the league in hits with 219. Each year from 1993−1998 he batted over .300, and in each year from 1995−1999, drove in at least 100 runs.

== Career ==
=== Professional career ===
Bichette attended Jupiter High School in Jupiter, Florida, and Palm Beach Community College. The California Angels selected Bichette in the 17th round of the 1984 Major League Baseball draft.

Bichette made his MLB debut with the Angels in 1988, but was a streaky hitter and was traded to the Milwaukee Brewers in exchange for Dave Parker in 1991. After putting up only average numbers with Milwaukee, he was traded to the new expansion team, the Colorado Rockies. On April 7, 1993, he hit the first home-run in Rockies history, a solo shot off New York Mets pitcher Bret Saberhagen. Bichette was part of the "Blake Street Bombers," who also included sluggers Larry Walker, Andrés Galarraga, Ellis Burks, and Vinny Castilla.

He finished the first Rockies season with 21 home runs and a .310 batting average, his personal best for both at the time. Bichette also hit his first home run at the newly constructed Coors Field, a 14th-inning walk-off smash against the Mets that secured an opening day victory for the Rockies in 1995. That season was Bichette's best, coming very close to the Triple Crown with a .340 batting average, 40 home runs and 128 RBI's. He narrowly lost the MVP voting to Barry Larkin of the Cincinnati Reds.

Bichette, 6 feet 3 inches (191 cm) tall and weighing 215 pounds (98 kg; 15 st 5 lb), began having knee problems in 1996, but was still successful as a hitter, with a .316 average, 31 home runs and 141 RBIs, plus 31 stolen bases. The 1996 season was only the second time ever that two players on the same team hit at least 30 home runs and collected 30 stolen bases, as Ellis Burks accomplished the same feat. Over the next three seasons, Bichette hit 26, 22, and 34 home runs respectively for the Rockies. He remains in the top 10 in many offensive categories for Colorado. On June 10, 1998, Bichette became the first player to hit for the cycle in an interleague game, when he accomplished the feat against the Texas Rangers, capping it off with a walk-off single to win the game for the Rockies in 10 innings.

On April 4, 1999, the Rockies made history as they played their Opening Day contest at Estadio de Béisbol Monterrey in Monterrey, Mexico, marking the first time Major League Baseball (MLB) commenced a regular season outside of the United States or Canada. Their opponent was the defending National League champion San Diego Padres. Bichette collected four hits, drove in four runs, and homered as Colorado won 8–2.

By the end of the 1999 season, his production was beginning to drop and the Rockies dealt Bichette to the Cincinnati Reds. However, his fielding was suffering tremendously and Bichette was eventually traded to the Boston Red Sox for a season and a half, then to the Los Angeles Dodgers. On March 22, 2002, Bichette retired before ever playing a game with the Dodgers.

In August 2004, Bichette rejoined professional baseball as a designated hitter, pitcher, and occasional outfielder for the Atlantic League's Nashua Pride. Bichette won the League's Player of the Month award for August (his first full month back). He completed the month with a .361 average and 13 homers. On August 28, he batted 4-for-5 with two home runs and eight RBIs.

=== Coaching career ===
On November 13, 2012, Bichette was hired to be the Colorado Rockies' hitting coach, replacing Carney Lansford. On September 24, 2013, he announced that he would not return for the 2014 season.

On July 24, 2020, it was confirmed during the opening game of the Toronto Blue Jays' season that Bichette had been added to their coaching staff full-time after summer camp.

On February 4, 2021, it was announced that Bichette would be reassigned as a special assistant within the Blue Jays organization "to continue to have an impact throughout multiple levels of the organization." On February 9, 2022, Bichette left Toronto so he could train with his son, Bo, which he could not contractually do due to the ongoing 2021–22 Major League Baseball lockout.

== Career statistics ==
In 1,704 games over 14 seasons, Bichette posted a .299 batting average (1906-for-6381) with 934 runs, 401 doubles, 27 triples, 274 home runs, 1141 RBI, 152 stolen bases, 355 base on balls, .336 on-base percentage and .499 slugging percentage. He recorded a .974 fielding percentage playing at all three outfield positions. In his only postseason appearance, at the 1995 NLDS, he hit .588 (10-for-17) with six runs, three doubles, one home run and three RBI.

== Personal life ==
In 1992, Bichette was arrested in Palm Beach County after reports of a domestic dispute with his pregnant girlfriend, Mariana Peng. Police responded to another incident involving Bichette and Peng the following year at his off-season home in Palm Beach Gardens.

Bichette and Peng were married in 1993.

In August 2005, Bichette's oldest son, Dante Jr., participated in the Little League World Series with his Maitland, Florida, team. Dante Bichette was one of the team's two assistant coaches, the other being former MLB player Mike Stanley. Dante Jr. was drafted 51st overall by the New York Yankees in 2011. Bichette's younger son, Bo, was selected by the Toronto Blue Jays in the 2016 draft, and made his MLB debut on July 29, 2019. Both Bo and Dante Jr. played for Brazil in the 2017 World Baseball Classic qualifier tournament; their mother, Mariana, is a native of Porto Alegre, Brazil. (Their maternal grandfather is a native of China who immigrated to Brazil.)

In 2017, Bichette was inducted into the Colorado Sports Hall of Fame.

== See also ==
- List of Major League Baseball career home run leaders
- List of Major League Baseball players to hit for the cycle
- List of second-generation Major League Baseball players

Awards and achievements
Preceded by Jeff Conine; Mike Piazza; Jeff Bagwell	National League Player of the Month; July 1995; September 1995; June 1996	Succeeded by Mike Piazza; Barry Bonds; Sammy Sosa
Preceded by Jeff Bagwell	National League Slugging Percentage Champion; 1995	Succeeded by Ellis Burks
Preceded by Mike Blowers	Hitting for the cycle June 10, 1998	Succeeded by Neifi Pérez
