= Dante Bichette Jr. =

American baseball player (born 1992)

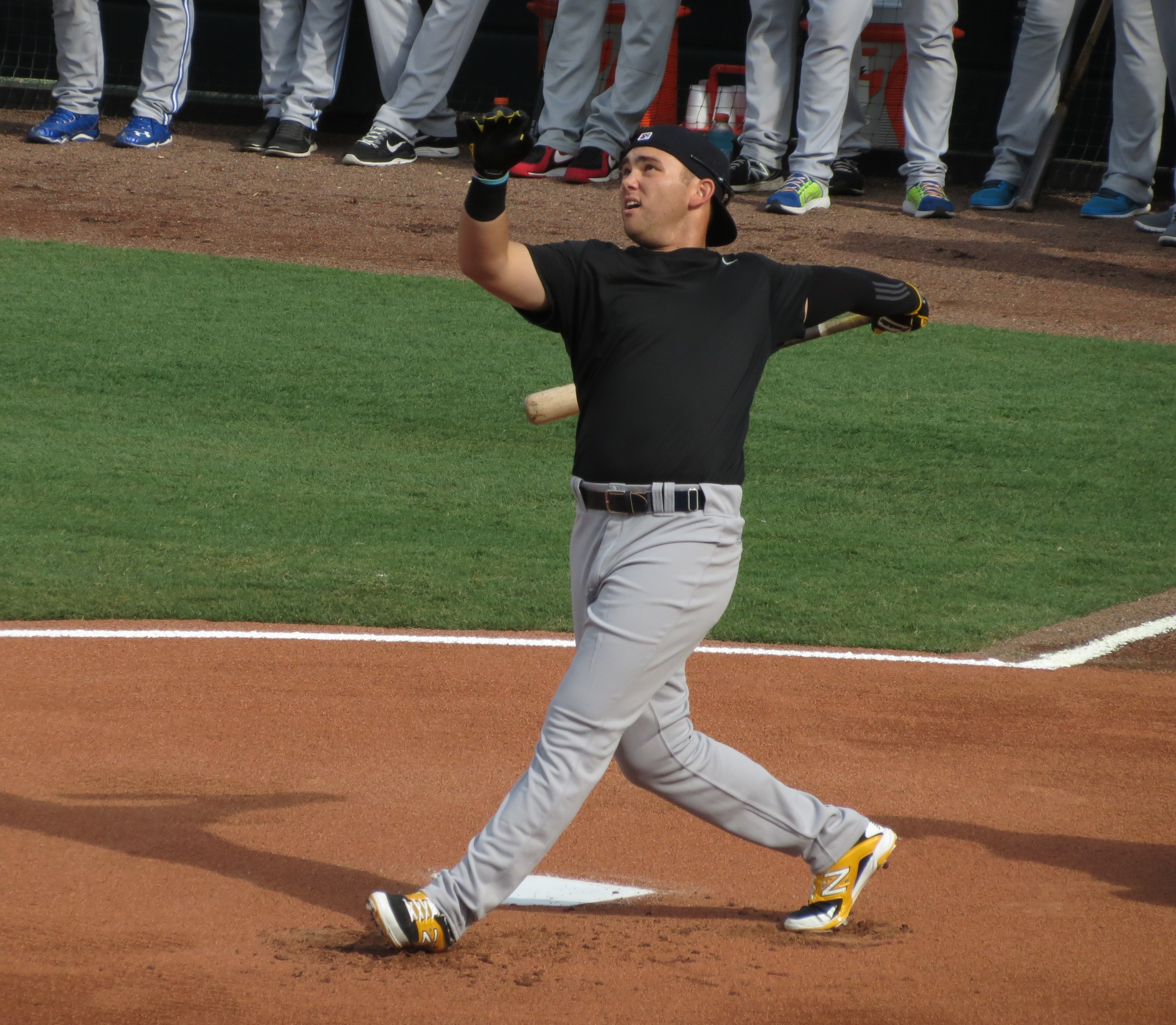
- Bichette Jr in 2014
- Third baseman / First baseman
- Born: September 26, 1992 (age 34); Orlando, Florida, U.S.
- Bats: Right Throws: Right
- Stats at Baseball Reference

Alphonse Dante Bichette Jr. (born September 26, 1992) is an American former professional baseball third baseman and first baseman. He was drafted by the New York Yankees of Major League Baseball (MLB) in the first round of the 2011 MLB draft.

== Early life and career ==
Bichette was born in Orlando, Florida, in 1992. His father, Dante, is a former Major League Baseball player and four-time All-Star. His younger brother, Bo, is also a baseball player, as of 2026 the third baseman for the New York Mets. He also had a sister named Valerie Bichette who lived in Plano, TX. His mother Mariana is a native of Porto Alegre, Brazil. His maternal grandfather is of Chinese descent.

Bichette played in the 2005 Little League World Series, representing Maitland, Florida. One of his teammates was future MLB player Max Moroff, and the team's two assistant coaches were Mike Stanley and Dante Bichette Sr. During his senior year at Orangewood Christian High School, he batted .640 with 10 home runs and 40 RBIs in 30 games.

== Professional career ==
=== New York Yankees ===
Bichette was drafted 51st overall in the 2011 Major League Baseball draft by the New York Yankees. He debuted in the Minor Leagues as part of the Yankees Gulf Coast League team, the GCL Yankees on June 20, 2011.

Bichette spent the 2017 season with the Double–A Trenton Thunder, playing in 72 games and hitting .262/.352/.353 with four home runs and 33 RBI. He elected free agency following the season on November 6, 2017.

=== St. Paul Saints ===
On December 23, 2017, Bichette signed a minor league contract with the Colorado Rockies. He was released on March 28, 2018.

On April 2, 2018, Bichette signed with the St. Paul Saints of the American Association of Independent Professional Baseball. In 99 games for the Saints, he batted .310/.355/.434 with nine home runs and 52 RBI.

=== High Point Rockers ===
On February 21, 2019, Bichette was traded to the High Point Rockers of the Atlantic League of Professional Baseball. He was named Atlantic League Player of the Month for April and May. Bichette appeared in 36 games for the Rockers, batting .386/.412/.514 with three home runs and 23 RBI.

=== Washington Nationals ===
On June 7, 2019, Bichette's contract was purchased by the Washington Nationals organization. He spent the remainder of the year with the Double–A Harrisburg Senators, batting .297/.348/.402 with two home runs and 33 RBI across 73 games. Bichette elected free agency following the season on November 4.

On December 26, 2019, Bichette re-signed with the Nationals on a minor league contract. He did not play in a game in 2020 due to the cancellation of the minor league season because of the COVID-19 pandemic. Bichette was released by the Nationals organization on May 31, 2020.

== International career ==
Bichette represented Brazil in the 2016 and 2025 World Baseball Classic Qualifiers. Both Bichette and his brother Bo Bichette have played for Brazil in the WBC. Bichette sported bright green hair when playing in the 2026 World Baseball Classic.
