= UC Santa Barbara Gauchos baseball statistical leaders =

The UC Santa Barbara Gauchos baseball statistical leaders are individual statistical leaders of the UC Santa Barbara Gauchos baseball program in various categories, including batting average, home runs, runs batted in, runs, hits, stolen bases, ERA, and Strikeouts. Within those areas, the lists identify single-game, single-season, and career leaders. The Gauchos represent the University of California, Santa Barbara in the NCAA's Big West Conference.

UC Santa Barbara began competing in intercollegiate baseball in 1922. These lists are updated through the end of the 2025 season.

== Batting Average ==
Career
Rk	Player	AVG	Seasons
1	Bill Geivett	.402	1984 1985
2	Dave Stewart	.379	1984 1985
3	Randy Robinson	.376	1975 1976
4	Mark Leonard	.373	1985 1986
5	Robbie Blauer	.367	2006 2007
6	Maury Ornest	.363	1979 1980
7	Dave Molidor	.361	1998 1999 2000 2001
	Brad Wright	.361	1997 1998 1999
9	Brad Shames	.360	1977 1978
10	Quinn Mack	.357	1986 1987

Season (200+ at-bats)
Rk	Player	AVG	Season
1	Bill Geivett	.412	1985
2	Randy Robinson	.407	1976
3	George Page	.404	1982
4	Scott Cerny	.403	1986
5	Skip Schumaker	.400	2001
6	Robbie Blauer	.398	2007
7	Ryan Kritscher	.397	1996
8	Dave Stewart	.395	1985
9	Chad Peshke	.394	2001
10	Quinn Mack	.393	1986

== Home Runs ==
Career
Rk	Player	HR	Seasons
1	Matt Wilkerson	42	2002 2003 2004 2005
	Broc Mortensen	42	2021 2022 2023
3	David Willis	41	1994 1995 1996 1997
4	Jeff Antoon	37	1989 1990 1991 1992
5	Austin Bush	34	2015 2016 2017
	Jared Janke	34	1993 1994 1995
7	Christian Kirtley	32	2019 2020 2021 2022 2023
8	Jeff Bannon	31	1998 1999 2000 2001
9	Tyler Von Schell	30	1999 2000 2001
	Rich Haar	30	1990 1991 1992 1993

Season
Rk	Player	HR	Season
1	Austin Bush	20	2017
2	Tyler Von Schell	18	2001
3	Greg Vella	17	1986
4	Matt Wilkerson	16	2002
	David Willis	16	1996
	Broc Mortensen	16	2022
7	Vince Texeira	15	1986
	Broc Mortensen	15	2021
	Jared Sundstrom	15	2023
	Ivan Brethowr	15	2024

Single Game
Rk	Player	HR	Season	Opponent
1	Mike Zuanich	3	2008	Westmont
	Matt Wilkerson	3	2002	UCLA
	Jared Janke	3	1993	Loyola Marymount
	David Waco	3	1990	Cal State Northridge
	Tyler Kuresa	3	2014	Wagner

== Runs Batted In ==
Career
Rk	Player	RBI	Seasons
1	Jeff Antoon	204	1989 1990 1991 1992
2	David Willis	192	1994 1995 1996 1997
3	Dave Molidor	187	1998 1999 2000 2001
4	Matt Wilkerson	186	2002 2003 2004 2005
5	Rich Haar	185	1990 1991 1992 1993
6	Chad Peshke	177	1998 1999 2000 2001
7	Erik Johnson	166	1984 1985 1986 1987
8	Bryan LaCour	161	1997 1998 1999
9	David Waco	160	1989 1990 1991 1992
10	Wynter Phoenix	158	1993 1994 1995 1996

Season
Rk	Player	RBI	Season
1	Vince Texeira	70	1986
2	Dave Molidor	67	2001
3	David Willis	66	1996
4	Tyler Von Schell	65	2001
	Dave Stewart	65	1984
6	Greg Vella	64	1986
7	Bryan LaCour	62	1997
	Jeff Antoon	62	1990
9	David Willis	61	1995
10	Austin Bush	60	2017
	Chris Malec	60	2002
	Rich Haar	60	1991
	Danny Lane	60	1991
	Dave Stewart	60	1985

Single Game
Rk	Player	RBI	Season	Opponent
1	Danny Lane	10	1991	USIU

== Runs ==
Career
Rk	Player	R	Seasons
1	Rich Haar	208	1990 1991 1992 1993
2	Chad Peshke	206	1998 1999 2000 2001
3	Jerrold Rountree	204	1988 1989 1990 1991
4	David Willis	190	1994 1995 1996 1997
5	Erik Johnson	181	1984 1985 1986 1987
6	Wynter Phoenix	176	1993 1994 1995 1996
7	Jeff Antoon	174	1989 1990 1991 1992
8	Matt Wilkerson	167	2002 2003 2004 2005
9	Nate Sutton	155	2001 2002 2003 2004

Season
Rk	Player	R	Season
1	Jerrold Rountree	79	1991
2	Bill Geivett	74	1985
3	Nate Sutton	71	2004
	Scott Cerny	71	1986
5	Mike Czarnetzki	68	1990
6	Skip Schumaker	65	2001
7	David Willis	64	1997
8	Michael Young	62	1997
	Vince Texeira	62	1986
10	Chad Peshke	61	2001

Single Game
Rk	Player	R	Season	Opponent
1	Bryan LaCour	6	1997	New Mexico State

== Hits ==
Career
Rk	Player	H	Seasons
1	Chad Peshke	294	1998 1999 2000 2001
2	Jeff Antoon	286	1989 1990 1991 1992
3	Erik Johnson	278	1984 1985 1986 1987
4	Rich Haar	276	1990 1991 1992 1993
5	Dave Molidor	273	1998 1999 2000 2001
6	David Willis	263	1994 1995 1996 1997
7	Jerrold Rountree	257	1988 1989 1990 1991
8	Matt Wilkerson	243	2002 2003 2004 2005
9	Wynter Phoenix	241	1993 1994 1995 1996
10	David Waco	239	1989 1990 1991 1992

Season
Rk	Player	H	Season
1	Skip Schumaker	100	2001
	Bill Geivett	100	1985
3	Brett Vertigan	96	2012
4	Jerrold Rountree	92	1991
5	Scott Cerny	91	1986
6	Dave Molidor	89	2001
7	Dave Stewart	88	1985
8	Chad Peshke	86	2001
	David Willis	86	1997
	Rich Haar	86	1991
	Mike Czarnetzki	86	1990
	Quinn Mack	86	1986

Single Game
Rk	Player	H	Season	Opponent
1	Brad Wright	7	1997	New Mexico State

== Stolen Bases ==
Career
Rk	Player	SB	Seasons
1	Jerrold Rountree	193	1988 1989 1990 1991
2	Mike Czarnetzki	70	1987 1988 1989 1990
3	Mike Merk	64	1980 1981
4	Mark Sauer	58	1980 1981
5	Brian Gump	54	2006 2007 2008 2009
6	Bob Brontsema	53	1982 1983
7	Paul Brown	51	1982 1983 1984 1985
	Jordan Sprinkle	51	2020 2021 2022
9	Joe Redfield	49	1982 1983
10	Steve Ross	48	1970 1971 1972

Season
Rk	Player	SB	Season
1	Jerrold Rountree	59	1989
2	Jerrold Rountree	57	1990
3	Jerrold Rountree	53	1991
4	Bob Brontsema	45	1983
5	Mike Czarnetzki	37	1990
6	Steve Clark	36	1982
	Mike Merk	36	1981
	Mark Sauer	36	1981
9	Doug Williams	34	1988
10	Dan Campbell	32	1988

Single Game
Rk	Player	SB	Season	Opponent
1	Jerrold Rountree	5	1991	Wake Forest
	Jerrold Rountree	5	1989	Cal Poly
	Joe Kemp	5	1987	Sonoma State

== Earned Run Average ==
Career
Rk	Player	ERA	Seasons
1	Steve Cushman	1.96	1966 1967
2	Hudson Barrett	2.12	2023 2024 2025
3	Dillon Tate	2.16	2013 2014 2015
4	Walt Rehm	2.31	1969 1970
5	Michael McGreevy	2.33	2018 2019 2020 2021
6	Jackson Flora	2.49	2024 2025 2026
7	Rodney Boone	2.52	2018 2019 2020 2021
8	Jeff Chancer	2.67	1969 1970 1971
9	Ryan Gallagher	2.72	2022 2024
10	Shane Bieber	2.73	2014 2015 2016

Season (minimum 50 innings pitched)
Rk	Player	ERA	Season
1	Craig Schell	1.02	1967
2	Jackson Flora	1.06	2026
3	Steve Coleman	1.71	1971
4	Steve Cushman	1.80	1967
5	Hudson Barrett	1.92	2023
6	Andrew Vasquez	1.93	2012
7	Michael McGreevy	1.94	2019
	Loren Fraser	1.94	2004
9	Walt Rehm	2.06	1970
10	John Schroeder	2.18	1966
	Kyle Nelson	2.18	2016

== Strikeouts ==
Career
Rk	Player	K	Seasons
1	Tyler Bremner	295	2023 2024 2025
2	Dan Yokubaitis	274	1980 1981 1982 1983
3	Jackson Flora	259	2024 2025 2026
4	Rodney Boone	239	2018 2019 2020 2021
5	Shane Bieber	237	2014 2015 2016
6	Mike Gutierrez	229	2022 2023 2024
7	Dave Walsh	216	1979 1980 1981 1982
	Matt Ager	216	2022 2023 2024
9	Steve Lane	213	1992 1993 1994 1995
10	Scott Longaker	207	1988 1989 1990 1991

Season
Rk	Player	K	Season
1	Jackson Flora	133	2026
2	Rodney Boone	128	2021
3	Dan Yokubaitis	124	1983
4	Barry Zito	123	1997
5	Michael McGreevy	115	2021
	Matt Ager	115	2023
7	Matthew Vedo	112	2012
	James Garcia	112	2001
	Renay Bryand	112	1988
10	Dillon Tate	111	2015
	Tyler Bremner	111	2025

Single Game
Rk	Player	K	Season	Opponent
1	Mario Hollands	16	2010	Northern Illinois
	Barry Zito	16	1997	New Mexico State
	Walt Rehm	16	1970	Westmont
