= List of Colorado Rockies owners and executives =

== Ownership group ==
- Monfort family
- Penner Sports Group
- Alvarado Construction
- Breakthru Beverage Group
- SAMT Sports 2013 LLC

== Executive officers ==
- Dick Monfort, chairman and chief executive officer
- Charlie Monfort, general partner
- Gregory D. Feasel, president/chief operating officer
- Paul DePodesta, president of baseball operations
- Josh Byrnes, general manager
- Rolando Fernandez, vice president - international scouting and development
- Bill Gaffney, senior vice president and general counsel
- Kevin H. Kahn, vice president/chief customer officer - ballpark operations
- James P. Kellogg, vice president – community and retail operations
- Douglas Mylowe, vice president – chief financial officer
- Sue Ann McClaren, vice president – ticket sales, operations and services
- Kimberly Molina, vice president – human resources
- Walker Monfort, executive vice president
- Danny Montgomery, vice president and assistant general manager of scouting
- Zach Rosenthal, vice president and assistant general manager of baseball operations and assistant general counsel

== Former executives ==
- Jerry McMorris (principal owner 1992–2005, president 1993–2001)
- Keli McGregor (president, 2001–2010)
- Bob Gebhard (general manager, 1992–1999)
- Dan O'Dowd (general manager, 1999–2014)
- Bill Geivett (director of major league operations, 2012–2014)
- Josh Byrnes (assistant general manager, 1999–2001)
- Jerry Dipoto (head of scouting, 2005)
- Jeff Bridich, senior vice president and general manager (2014–2021)
- William E. Schmidt, senior vice president and general manager (2021–2025)
