= UC Santa Barbara Gauchos baseball =

- 2026 UC Santa Barbara Gauchos baseball team
- Founded: 1922
- University: University of California, Santa Barbara
- Head coach: Andrew Checketts (15th season)
- Conference: Big West
- Location: Santa Barbara, California
- Home stadium: Caesar Uyesaka Stadium (capacity: 1,000)
- Nickname: Gauchos
- Colors: Blue and gold

College World Series appearances
- 2016

NCAA regional champions
- 2016

NCAA tournament appearances
- 1952, 1972, 1983, 1986, 1987, 1990, 1996, 2001, 2013, 2015, 2016, 2019, 2021, 2022, 2024, 2026

Conference regular season champions
- 1950, 1952, 1954, 1972, 1983, 1986, 2019, 2022, 2024, 2026

The UC Santa Barbara Gauchos baseball team represents the University of California, Santa Barbara in the sport of baseball. The Gauchos compete in Division I of the National Collegiate Athletic Association (NCAA) through the Big West Conference. They are currently led by head coach Andrew Checketts, who led his fifth season with the Gauchos in 2016.

== History ==
=== Emergence of a team ===
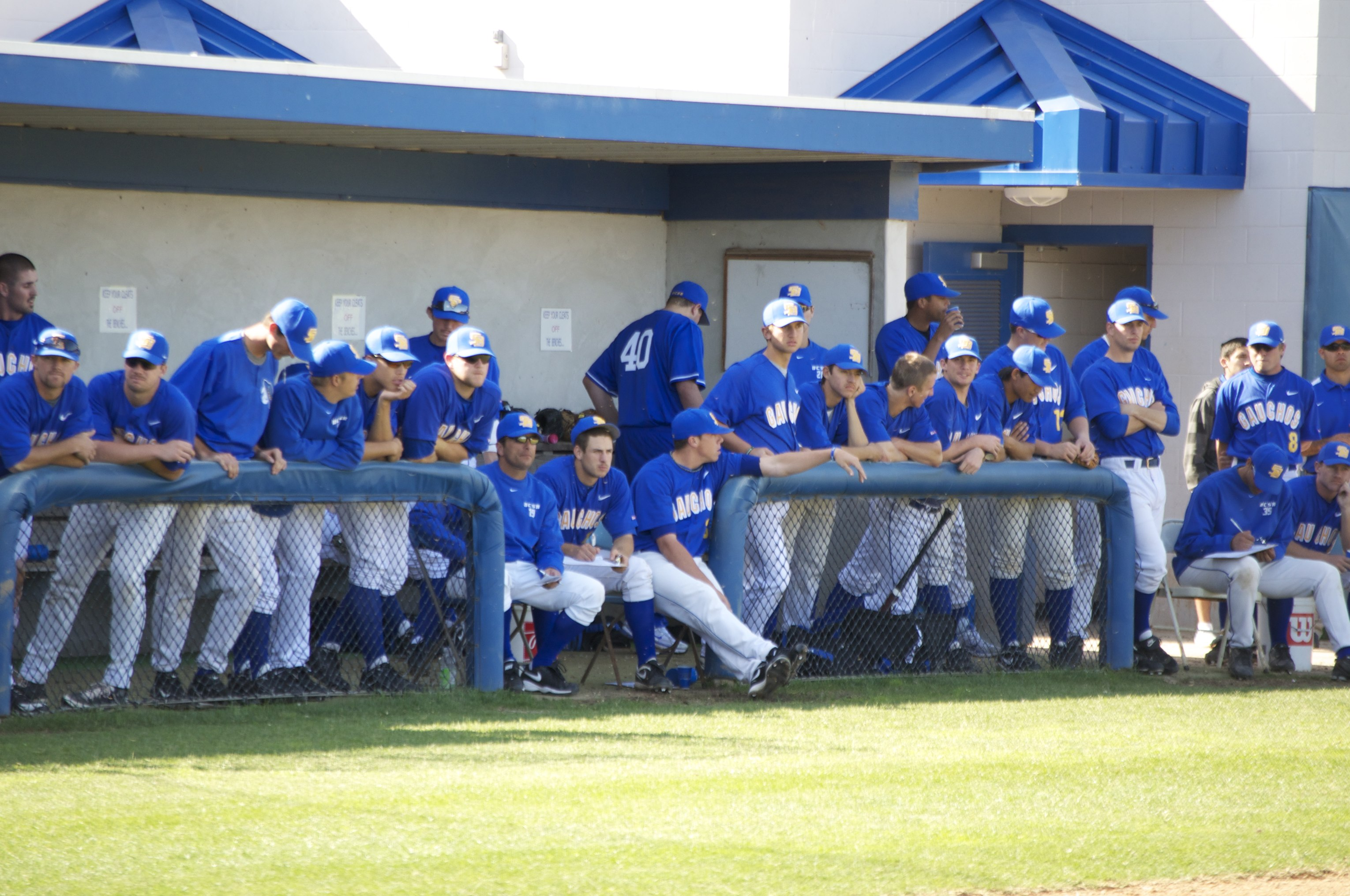
UCSB baseball team in the home dugout, March 2010

Few records exist from the start of Santa Barbara's baseball program. Through its different incarnations, Santa Barbara has fielded a team as early as 1922. The first known head coach is Kenneth Bolton, who coached in only the 1922 season before handing the reins to O. J. Gilliland in 1923. C.J. Anderson, Ralph DeBolt, Henry Minetti, Lewis Peters, Arthur Peterson, Harold Sanford, Fred Seegert, Louis Sherril, William Thrasher, Linn Unkefer, and John Vince are the first known players and were listed on the 1923 team.

Santa Barbara State Teachers College, as one of the precursors to the present day UC Santa Barbara, played in the Southern California Intercollegiate Athletic Conference as far back as the 1932–33 season. It is likely to have had even earlier teams in the SCIAC as records show Santa Barbara joined the conference in 1931.

Santa Barbara's first reliable team of record can be traced back to 1947, then led by Spud Harder. Wearing multiple hats, Harder served as Santa Barbara's athletic director, head football coach, and head baseball coach. The team played in the California Collegiate Athletic Association from at least 1947 until 1958 when it left to compete in the California Intercollegiate Baseball Association.

Roy Engle, a dual sport head coach in football and baseball in the mold of Spud Harder, took over the program in 1952 and led the Gauchos to their first ever post-season berth. The Gauchos lost both games they played against the Fresno State Bulldogs baseball team by a combined score of 28-6.

=== Conference volatility ===
Rene Rochelle took over the program in 1954 and coached the team through the CCAA to CIBA transition. He spent 6 seasons as head coach before Dave Gorrie took the lead for the 1960 season.

Gorrie was at the helm for over 700 games in Gaucho blue and gold, and provided a bit of stability to the team as it bounced from conference to conference in the 1960s and 1970s. Throughout his 18 seasons as head coach, saw six league status changes. He endured through a rough start to his tenure, with the team compiling a 32–95 record in conference play his first seven seasons – the worst such stretch in Gaucho baseball history. A change in for the 1967, going from CIBA competition to becoming an independent, marked the end of the slide. Independent ball lasted just one season with the Gauchos joining the West Coast Athletic Conference in 1968. The stay was short – just two seasons – before the Gauchos were on the move again.

Beginning with the 1970 season, the Gauchos competed in the Big West Conference through 1974. This period contained Gorrie's best season with the Gauchos - a 31–16 season which saw the Gauchos go 14–4 in Big West play, resulting in their second-ever NCAA post season berth. In the 1972 NCAA University Division baseball tournament, the Gauchos recorded their first-ever postseason wins against Santa Clara Broncos, before losing to eventual National Champions USC Trojans. It also marked the first time in UC Santa Barbara history that their baseball team was nationally ranked at the end of the season after being ranked 17th at the conclusion of the year.

=== Andrew Checketts era ===
In the 2015 NCAA Division I baseball season, the Gauchos set a program record for wins en route to hosting their first ever NCAA Regional in the 2015 NCAA Division I baseball tournament. Star pitcher Dillon Tate was drafted 4th overall in the 2015 Major League Baseball draft.

The 2016 NCAA Division I baseball season saw the Gauchos build on their success. They were thought to be too young to compete at a high level for 2016 and placed 4th in the Big West Conference's preseason coaches' poll. UCSB advanced to the 2016 NCAA Division I baseball tournament with an at-large bid, then subsequently made NCAA Super Regional and NCAA College World Series appearances for the first time in the school's history. Gaucho fans adopted a soccer chant commonly used at UC Santa Barbara Gauchos men's soccer games while in Omaha.

The Gauchos returned to the NCAA tournament in 2019 by winning their first outright Big West regular season title with a record of 45-9, 19–5 in conference. The Gauchos won 13 series over the entire season, only dropping 2 series all year. The team was drawn into the Stanford regional, and lost the opener 9–2 to Fresno State, and again lost 6–4 to Sacramento State, ending their season.

== UC Santa Barbara in the NCAA Tournament ==
Year	Record	Pct	Notes
1972	3-3	.500	District 8
1983	2–2	.500	West I Regional
1986	1–2	.333	West Regional
1987	0–2	.000	West I Regional
1990	0–2	.000	West II Regional
1996	0–2	.000	West Regional
2001	1–2	.333	South Bend Regional
2013	1–2	.333	Corvallis Regional
2015	0–2	.000	Hosted Lake Elsinore Regional
2016	6–2	.750	College World Series 5th Place, Louisville Super Regional Champions
2019	0–2	.000	Stanford Regional
2021	2–2	.500	Tucson Regional
2022	1–2	.333	Stanford Regional
2024	2–2	.500	Hosted Santa Barbara Regional
2026	2–2	.500	Austin Regional
TOTALS	21–31	.404	

== Head coaching history ==
Coach	Years
Kenneth Bolton	1922
Otho J. Gilliland	1923–1926
Dudley DeGroot	1928–1929
Seldon Spalding	1929–1930
Harold Davis	1930–1936
Spud Harder	1936–1947
Joe Lantenge	1948
Spud Harder	1949–1951
Roy Engle	1951–1953
Rene Rochelle	1953–1959
Dave Gorrie	1959–1977
Mike Simpson	1978–1980
Al Ferrer	1981–1993
Bob Brontsema	1994–2011
Andrew Checketts	2012–present

== Notable former players ==
This list of notable former players comprises players who went on to play professional baseball after playing for the team. Players denoted in bold represent MLB All-Stars. Players denoted in italics represent World Series Champions.

- **Shane Bieber**
- Matt Clark
- Noah Davis
- Bruce Egloff
- Tom Gamboa
- Bill Geivett
- Mario Hollands
- Erik Johnson
- Brian Kingman
- Joe Kmak
- Justin Lehr
- Mark Leonard
- Quinn Mack
- Greg Mahle
- Joe Martin
- Michael McGreevy
- Ed Pierce
- Joe Redfield
- Skip Schumaker
- Greg Shanahan
- **Chris Speier**
- Ryan Spilborghs
- Dillon Tate
- Chris Valaika
- Virgil Vasquez
- Dave Walsh
- Stefan Wever
- **Michael Young**
- **Barry Zito**

== The Blue-Green Rivalry ==
The main rival of the UC Santa Barbara Gauchos baseball team is the Cal Poly Mustangs baseball team. The rivalry is a part of the larger Blue–Green Rivalry, which encompasses all sports from the two schools.

== See also ==
- List of NCAA Division I baseball programs
