= David Shapira =

American businessman

David S. Shapira is an American businessman. He is Chairman, Chief Executive Officer, and President of Giant Eagle, Inc. He joined the company in 1971 and has been President and CEO since 1980. Until 2009, he was the chairman of Carnegie Mellon University's Board of Trustees.

In 1982, he co-founded Phar-Mor with Michael I. Monus.

In 2012, his daughter Laura Shapira Karet took over as CEO for private company Giant Eagle, Inc., which was removed from the company by its Board of Directors in late March 2023.

He was also a member of the board of Directors of Equitable Resources, Inc. (NYSE: EQT), a Pennsylvania natural gas and oil company with emphasis on the Appalachian area.

He received his undergraduate degree from Oberlin College in 1963 and an MA in Economics from Stanford University.
