= Jackson Flora =

American baseball player (born 2005)

San Francisco Giants
- Pitcher
- Born: May 25, 2005 (age 21); Walnut Creek, California, U.S.
- Bats: Right Throws: Right
- Stats at Baseball Reference

Jackson Reed Flora (born May 25, 2005) is an American professional baseball pitcher in the San Francisco Giants organization.

== Career ==
Flora was born on May 25, 2005, in Walnut Creek, California. He grew up in Pleasanton where he attended Foothill High School and played baseball as a pitcher and infielder. After high school, he began attending the University of California, Santa Barbara, in 2024, becoming a pitcher for the UC Santa Barbara Gauchos baseball team.

As a freshman at UC Santa Barbara in 2024, Flora was mainly used as a relief pitcher, pitching 47 innings while striking out 40 batters with an earned-run average (ERA) of 3.83. He appeared in 23 games and made four starts while posting a record of 3–2, earning honorable mention All-Big West Conference honors. The following year, he helped the Gauchos compile a record of 36–18 while serving as their starting pitcher for most of the season. Flora recorded an ERA of 3.60 and had 86 strikeouts with only 17 walks across 75 innings, posting a record of 6–3. He ranked among the top 10 in the conference in ERA and was selected first-team All-Big West. After the collegiate season, he was invited to the USA Collegiate National Team training camp. As a junior for UC Santa Barbara in 2026, Flora made 16 starts and had a 12-0 record, a 1.06 ERA and 133 strikeouts across 102 innings pitched. He was named the Big West Conference Pitcher of the Year as well as winning the National Pitcher of the Year Award.

Flora was regarded as a top prospect for the 2026 Major League Baseball draft. He was widely considered the best collegiate pitcher available in the draft. He was selected by the San Francisco Giants in the first round with the fourth overall pick. He signed on July 18 for a $7,997,500 bonus.
