= Monfort brothers =

Colorado Rockies owners

Charles and Richard Monfort
- Occupation: Businessmen
- Years active: 2006–present
- Known for: Colorado Rockies owners and operators
- Charles K. Monfort
- Born: October 30, 1959 (age 67); Greeley, Colorado, U.S.
- Richard L. Monfort
- Born: April 27, 1954 (age 72); Greeley, Colorado, U.S.

Charles K. Monfort (born October 30, 1959) and Richard L. Monfort (born April 27, 1954) are American primary owners and operators of the Colorado Rockies Major League Baseball team. Both grew up in Greeley, Colorado, and are sons to Kenneth Monfort, the previous owner of Monfort of Colorado, Inc., a meatpacking and distributing company that was acquired by ConAgra Foods in 1987. Dick Monfort is managing general partner, chairman and chief executive officer, while Charles Monfort is the team's other general partner and vice chairman.

== Richard Monfort ==
Richard Monfort was the first born of the two Monfort brothers. Richard graduated from the University of Northern Colorado, Greeley in 1976 with a bachelor's degree in Business Management. He joined Monfort of Colorado in 1974 as a cattle buyer. He then served as vice president federal cattle procurement from 1979 to 1981, group vice president of cattle products 1983–1984 and executive vice president 1984–1987. When ConAgra bought Monfort of Colorado in 1987, Richard became president of ConAgra Red Meats. Richard also owns shares in the Hyatt Regency Indian Wells Resort and Spa in Indian Wells, California, the Hilltop Steak House in Boston, and other real estate ventures in Colorado. At the University of Northern Colorado, Richard serves on the board of trustees along with the board of directors at University of Colorado Hospital, Denver Zoo and the Colorado Economic Development Board. Richard now resides in Denver, Colorado, with his wife Karen.

== Charles Monfort ==
Charles Monfort graduated from the University of Utah in 1982 with a bachelor's degree in Marketing and Business Management where he served as president of Kappa Sigma fraternity. Charles started working for the family business Monfort of Colorado, Inc. also in 1988 as president of International Sales until 1996. In 1996, Charles became president of ConAgra Foods International; later leaving in 1998 to concentrate on his previous commitment to the Rockies. Charles also serves on the board of trustees at Colorado Mesa University (formerly Mesa State College) in Grand Junction, Colorado. All along with being a board member of the Kempe Foundation, the Special Olympics, and the Monfort Family Foundation. Charles has son Kenny, daughter Ciara, son Lucas, daughter Danica and stepson Brenden.

== Colorado Rockies affiliations ==
On September 2, 1992, Jerry McMorris welcomed Charles Monfort and Oren Benton to join him in buying controlling interest in the Rockies. This came after founding owner Mickey Monus was ensnared in a massive accounting scandal surrounding his Phar-Mor discount drugstores. Richard Monfort later replaced Benton in the ownership group and became vice chairman of the Rockies on December 8, 1997. On March 31, 2003, Charles was named CEO of the Colorado Rockies, succeeding president Keli McGregor who had taken the role from McMorris in 2001. In 2005, Richard and Charles Monfort purchased McMorris’ financial interest in the team, becoming the primary owners. Charles remained as managing general partner, chairman and CEO until 2011, when he handed both roles to Richard.

Under their tenure, the Rockies have made the playoffs only four times while having just five winning seasons from 2005 to 2025. Prior to the 2023 season, Richard told a crowd at a local charity breakfast that the club was capable of achieving a .500 winning percentage in 2023. The 2023 Colorado Rockies went 59–103 with a winning percentage of .364, giving them the worst record in the National League that season.

Sporting positions
Preceded by Jerry McMorris	Colorado Rockies; Owner and Operator; 2006–present	Succeeded by Current
