= Jeff Bridich =

American baseball executive (born 1977)

- Born: Jeffrey Thomas Bridich; September 10, 1977 (age 49); Whitefish Bay, Wisconsin, U.S.
- Education: Harvard University

Jeffrey Thomas Bridich (/ˈbraɪdɪtʃ/ BRY-ditch; born September 10, 1977) is an American former baseball executive. He was the general manager of the Colorado Rockies of Major League Baseball from 2014 to 2021.

== Biography ==
Bridich is from Whitefish Bay in Milwaukee County, Wisconsin. He attended Marquette University High School, where he played for the school's baseball and American football teams. He enrolled at Harvard University, where he played college baseball for the Harvard Crimson. He began his tenure with the Crimson as a catcher before playing as an outfielder. He graduated from Harvard in 2000. After his graduation, Bridich worked as an intern in Major League Baseball's (MLB) executive office. He worked for MLB for four years, and helped lead the Arizona Fall League.

Bridich joined the Rockies' front office in December 2004, when he was hired to manage the team's Minor League Baseball operations. In October 2005, the Rockies promoted Bridich to succeed Thad Levine as their director of baseball operations. He served as the Rockies' senior director of player development from 2011 through 2014. After the 2014 season, on October 8, Dan O'Dowd, the Rockies' general manager, and Bill Geivett, the Rockies' director of major league operations, resigned. Bridich was appointed the team's new general manager to succeed them. The Rockies announced on April 26, 2021, that Bridich had stepped down as general manager.

== Personal life ==
Bridich's father, Rick, also played college baseball for the Harvard Crimson. Rick coached Jeff's high school baseball team. Jeff Bridich currently resides in Denver, Colorado, where he lives with his wife, Sarah. They have two children.
