= Andrew Checketts =

American college baseball coach and player

Current position
- Title: Head coach
- Team: UC Santa Barbara
- Conference: Big West
- Record: 529–286–3

Biographical details
- Born: October 8, 1975 (age 51)
- Education: Oregon State '98

Playing career
- 1995: Florida
- 1996–1998: Oregon State
- Position: Pitcher

Coaching career (HC unless noted)
- 2001: Riverside CC (asst.)
- 2002–2007: UC Riverside (asst.)
- 2008–2011: Oregon (asst.)
- 2012–present: UC Santa Barbara

Head coaching record
- Overall: 529–286–3
- Tournaments: NCAA: 14–15

Accomplishments and honors

Championships
- 4x Big West (2019, 2022, 2024, 2026)

Awards
- 4× Big West Coach of the Year (2019, 2022, 2024, 2026)

Andrew Checketts (born October 8, 1975) is an American college baseball coach and former player. He currently is the head coach of the UC Santa Barbara Gauchos.

== Playing career ==
Checketts graduated from West Linn High School in West Linn, Oregon and was named 1994 Oregon State High School Player of the Year. He then played one season at Florida before transferring to Oregon State for his remaining three years. In his final year with the Beavers, he posted an 11–1 record, earning conference and national honors and a 21st round selection by the Boston Red Sox in the 1998 Major League Baseball draft. He played briefly in the Red Sox system at the end of 1998, then played for the Independent Tri-City Posse for one season before turning to coaching.

== Coaching career ==
Checketts began coaching at Riverside Community College in 2001, serving as pitching coach and helping the team to their second state championship. The next season, he moved across town to UC Riverside where he stayed for six seasons as pitching coach and later recruiting coordinator. The Highlanders claimed their first Big West Conference championship in his final season and ranked highly in several national statistical pitching categories. Checketts then moved to Oregon, which re-launched its program in 2008. He served as pitching coach and was also instrumental in several strong recruiting classes for the Ducks. In his time at UC Riverside and Oregon, Checketts had 36 pitchers drafted or sign pro contracts, including nine draft picks in three years at Oregon.

Following the 2011 season, Checketts was named as the ninth head coach in UC Santa Barbara history. The Gauchos were coming off a sixth-place finish in the competitive Big West Conference and had not appeared in the NCAA tournament since 2001. He claimed 28 wins in his first season, most in school history for a first year head coach, and his pitching staff set a school record for strikeouts. UC Santa Barbara also led the league in batting for the first time since 1984. In Checketts' first recruiting class he brought in Dillon Tate, who later became the 4th overall pick in the 2015 Major League Baseball draft.

== Head coaching record ==
Below is a table of Checketts's yearly records as an NCAA head baseball coach.

Record table
Season	Team	Overall	Conference	Standing	Postseason
UC Santa Barbara (Big West Conference) (2012–present)
2012	UC Santa Barbara	28–28	10–14	T–6th	
2013	UC Santa Barbara	35–25	17–10	T–2nd	NCAA Regional
2014	UC Santa Barbara	34–17	12–12	T–5th	
2015	UC Santa Barbara	40–17–1	16–8	2nd	NCAA Regional
2016	UC Santa Barbara	43–20–1	13–11	3rd	College World Series
2017	UC Santa Barbara	24–32	8–16	T-8th	
2018	UC Santa Barbara	27–28–1	10–14	7th	
2019	UC Santa Barbara	45–11	19–5	1st	NCAA Regional
2020	UC Santa Barbara	13–2	0–0		Season canceled due to COVID-19
2021	UC Santa Barbara	41–20	29–11	2nd	NCAA Regional
2022	UC Santa Barbara	44–14	27–3	1st	NCAA Regional
2023	UC Santa Barbara	35–20	18–12	T-5th	
2024	UC Santa Barbara	44–14	26–4	1st	NCAA Regional
2025	UC Santa Barbara	36–18	16–14	T–4th	
2026	UC Santa Barbara	40–20	22–8	T–1st	NCAA Regional
UC Santa Barbara:		529–286–3	243–140		
Total:		529–286–3			
National champion Postseason invitational champion Conference regular season champion Conference regular season and conference tournament champion Division regular season champion Division regular season and conference tournament champion Conference tournament champion

== See also ==
- List of current NCAA Division I baseball coaches
