= Michael I. Monus =

American businessman

Michael I. "Mickey" Monus (born 1947) is the former president of Phar-Mor, Inc., founder of the World Basketball League and was an original owner of the Colorado Rockies, a Major League Baseball expansion team. Phar-Mor was a deep-discount drug and grocery retail chain that established a strong national presence before declaring bankruptcy in the early 1990s. Accused of perpetrating an embezzlement scheme behind one of the largest corporate frauds in US history, Monus was fired from the company and faced criminal charges. He would be convicted of 109 fraud related charges and serve 10 years of a 19 1/2 year prison sentence. He was born in Youngstown, Ohio, which is where Phar-Mor was headquartered.

== Early years ==
Monus was born into a prominent family on the north side of Youngstown, Ohio. His father, Nathan H. Monus (1921–2016), was a prominent businessman and the estranged younger brother of Mike Monus and Al B. Monus (1918–?). Mickey's mother, Frances Tamarkin Monus, was a housewife. Mickey attended the Rayen School and University School, a boys preparatory school in Shaker Heights, Ohio. He graduated from Babson College in Wellesley, Massachusetts.

Monus returned to Youngstown, where he worked for a family business. His return coincided with the collapse of the community's core steel industry, and Monus became intrigued with the possibility of launching a retail enterprise whose operations stretched beyond the borders of his hometown.

== Phar-Mor ==
=== Origins ===
Monus partnered with David Shapira, to launch Phar-Mor, a "deep discount" drugstore which used a strategy of aggressive buying to provide customers with tremendous savings, if fewer selections. With startup money provided by Giant Eagle, Inc., the supermarket company in which Shapira's family members were large shareholders, the Phar-Mor discount drug chain became enormously successful. In 1988, the chain featured 100 stores, and Monus was described in the media as one of the nation's leading entrepreneurs. In an effort to revitalize his hometown's deteriorating retail district, Monus located the company's national headquarters in a remodeled former department store in downtown Youngstown. A notoriously tough negotiator, he was able to keep retail prices low; and by 1991, there were 200 Phar-Mor outlets across the country. Sam Walton once called Monus the only retailer that he feared, since he couldn't understand how Phar-Mor grew so rapidly in a short time. In addition, Monus and another Youngstown businessman, John Antonucci, were the original majority owners of Major League Baseball's Colorado Rockies; they'd even secured the financing for what would become Coors Field.

=== Rising issues ===
Amid this success, however, Monus began to show signs of becoming overextended. PharMor stores expanded into new lines, including sportswear. Meanwhile, Monus' decision to sponsor the World Basketball League placed severe financial pressure on the corporation. It was speculated that Mickey Monus' father Nathan was somehow able to escape an indictment despite seemingly significant involvement in the massive fraud.

=== Dissolution ===
In July 1992, board members of Phar-Mor alleged that financial books stored at the corporate headquarters showed that the company had inflated its profits by huge margins. It would be considered one of the largest frauds in US history.

Court documents also indicated that Monus had embezzled about $10 million from the company, mainly to support his beleaguered World Basketball League, and extravagant lifestyle. Monus' business partner David Shapira contacted federal agents, notified investors, and fired Monus, along with Phar-Mor's chief financial officer Patrick Finn. Unsecured claims against Monus totaled $4,104,121, while secured claims were calculated at $15,257,545.

The subsequent collapse of the discount chain not only marked the end of Monus' tenure as a leading entrepreneur; it disillusioned residents of his hometown, who were still coping with the loss of the community's steel-manufacturing sector.

Monus and Antonucci were forced to sell their stake in the Colorado Rockies. The scandal around Monus forced a last-minute search for a new owner; it was nearly sold to Tampa investors before being bought by Jerry McMorris.

== Legal proceedings ==
Monus was eventually convicted of having embezzled $10 million.

[He] was convicted of one count of conspiracy, two counts of bank fraud, five counts of wire fraud, two counts of mail fraud, two counts of filing false income tax returns tax evasion, 96 counts of interstate transportation of stolen property fence (criminal) (money) and one count of obstruction of justice.

On May 25, 1995, Monus was found guilty on all 109 fraud related charges he faced in the government's second attempt to try him; the first trial, where Monus faced a larger 126 criminal charges, ended in a hung jury. He was later charged with jury tampering in the first trial, but was acquitted.

He was sentenced to 19½ years in federal prison and served 10 years. The sentence was reduced after Monus cooperated with federal authorities (FBI) in a case against another Youngstown fraudster, Richard Goldberg.

=== Youngstown State University ===
Monus was also a major benefactor to Youngstown State University, serving as chairman of its board of trustees. It emerged that Ray Isaac, the quarterback for the 1991 Youngstown State Penguins football team (which won the NCAA Division I-AA National Championship that year), had received substantial benefits from Monus over his college career, including $10,000 in cash, and the use of several cars. The NCAA made an inquiry after being tipped off to Monus' actions, but dropped it after a cursory internal investigation by the university. The true scope of the violations was only revealed in 1998, when Isaac admitted tampering with a juror in Monus' fraud trial. The university admitted to a lack of institutional control, and docked itself some scholarships; however, it was allowed to keep the 1991 national championship, because the statute of limitations had expired.
