= Quinn Mack =

American baseball player (born 1965)

- Outfielder
- Born: September 11, 1965 (age 60); Los Angeles, California, U.S.
- Batted: Left Threw: Left

MLB debut
- June 16, 1994, for the Seattle Mariners

Last MLB appearance
- June 21, 1994, for the Seattle Mariners

MLB statistics
- Batting average: .238
- Hits: 5
- Stolen bases: 2
- Stats at Baseball Reference

Teams
- Seattle Mariners (1994)

Quinn David Mack (born September 11, 1965) is an American former professional baseball outfielder. He played in five games for the Seattle Mariners of Major League Baseball in 1994.

Mack attended Gahr High School in Cerritos, California, then Cerritos College. Mack and teammate Ever Magallanes helped Cerritos win the California community college baseball championship in 1985. Mack then played for the UC Santa Barbara Gauchos.

Mack signed with the Montreal Expos out of college and was released in early 1993, next signing with the Mariners. Mack's five major league games came between June 16 and June 21, 1994. In his MLB debut, Mack went 3-for-5 with two doubles. In the next four games, however, he went 2-for-16, finishing with a .238 MLB batting average. Mack returned to the minors, playing there in 1995 and part of 1996. He also played in the Mexican Baseball League in 1996 and 1997.

== Personal life ==
Mack's older brother, Shane Mack, also played outfield in MLB.

Mack and his wife have a son who played in the minor leagues in 2015 and 2016.
