= Mario Hollands =

American baseball player (born 1988)

- Pitcher
- Born: August 26, 1988 (age 37); Oakland, California, U.S.
- Batted: Left Threw: Left

MLB debut
- April 1, 2014, for the Philadelphia Phillies

Last MLB appearance
- September 3, 2014, for the Philadelphia Phillies

MLB statistics
- Win–loss record: 2–2
- Earned run average: 4.40
- Strikeouts: 35
- Stats at Baseball Reference

Teams
- Philadelphia Phillies (2014)

Mario Eduardo Lemus Hollands (born August 26, 1988) is an American former professional baseball left-handed relief pitcher. He played in Major League Baseball (MLB) for the Philadelphia Phillies in 2014.

Hollands played college baseball for the UC Santa Barbara Gauchos, where he earned a degree in sociology. The Phillies drafted him in the 2010 MLB draft, and after a few seasons in their farm system, they invited him to spring training, in 2014. After performing well in those exhibition games, he made the Phillies' 2014 Opening Day roster, and although he walked too many hitters, showed some potential to emerge as a decent relief pitcher. His teammates described him as a good personality in the bullpen, and his coaches approved of his development. Hollands, meanwhile, continued to further his college education, pursuing yet another degree, this time, studying merchandise marketing, at the Fashion Institute of Design & Merchandising.

== Early life and education ==
Hollands attended El Cerrito High School in El Cerrito, California, where he played for the school's baseball team as a pitcher. He then enrolled at the University of California, Santa Barbara (UCSB), where he played college baseball for the UC Santa Barbara Gauchos baseball team.

After redshirting his first season, he was named the Big West Conference freshman of the year and received placement on the national freshman All-American team in 2008. His sophomore season was less successful and was hampered by a groin injury. The Minnesota Twins drafted him in the subsequent draft, but he did not sign. He focused on bulking up and improving the velocity of his fastball, which gained about 3 miles per hour (4.8 km/h) thanks to his work. In college, his coaches praised his mental toughness, a key to being a good pitcher.

In 2008, he played collegiate summer baseball in the Cape Cod Baseball League (CCBL) for the Cotuit Kettleers, and returned to the CCBL in 2009 to play for the Yarmouth-Dennis Red Sox.

Hollands went on to have a strong senior season, during which he "was twice named the Big West Pitcher of the Week, twice named the National Pitcher of the Year, and tied a school record with a 16-strikeout performance." He graduated from UCSB with a degree in sociology. The Philadelphia Phillies selected Hollands in the tenth round of the 2010 Major League Baseball draft.

== Professional career ==
=== Minor league career ===
Hollands pitched for the Lakewood BlueClaws of the Single–A South Atlantic League in 2011 and then pitched for Lakewood, the Clearwater Threshers of the High–A Florida State League, the Reading Phillies of the Double–A Eastern League, and the Lehigh Valley IronPigs of the Triple–A International League in 2012. Essentially, Hollands pitched for "whatever minor-league team required pitching help", which in one case required him to sleep on the living room floor of a shared apartment. Late in the season in Lehigh Valley, he compiled a 9.24 earned run average (ERA) in three starts and possessed a fastball that reached only 86 miles per hour (138 km/h), prompting Rod Nichols, then Lehigh Valley's pitching coach, and subsequently the Phillies' bullpen coach, to praise Hollands' work ethic, but opine that his pitching repertoire was insufficiently effective. He had a solid 2013 season with Clearwater and Reading, recording a 1.56 ERA in 14 games for Clearwater between May 3 and July 10, and then a 4.06 ERA after being promoted to Reading. He then pitched for the Tiburones de La Guaira in the Venezuelan Winter League after the season, recording a 2.45 ERA. Phillies' officials credited that experience in Venezuelan winner ball as the impetus for his subsequent success. Hollands commented, "I've just gotten better," while Nichols commented, "He found it."

=== Major league career ===
The Phillies invited Hollands to spring training in 2014. He made the team's Opening Day roster after compiling a 3.09 ERA in nine exhibition appearances. His performance in spring training left Phillies' manager Ryne Sandberg and pitching coach Bob McClure "smitten," especially considering the fact that he entered spring training as a "veritable unknown." He made his major league debut on April 1, coming into the ninth inning of a tied game. Hollands allowed two walks, before being relieved by B. J. Rosenberg, who allowed an inherited runner to score. Hollands received the loss. As the season progressed, Hollands was rather streaky, seeing some success in May and June, but experiencing a stretch in July during which he retired only seven of 19 batters, and surrendered six runs. He walked 10.3% of the batters he faced. Ryan Sommers of Crashburn Alley commented,

"Free passes aside, Hollands demonstrated the ability to generate swings and misses, and had the Goddess of Outcomes been a bit fairer to him, he may have been within spitting distance of league average effectiveness. It’s not impossible to imagine Hollands as a reliable medium leverage reliever — sorry, Ryne, I meant “7th inning guy” — if he can improve his control and be able to attack hitters with his slider more frequently in pitcher’s counts.

Overall, Hollands pitched 50 games and compiled a 4.40 ERA with a 2–2 record.

As spring training 2015 began, Hollands noted that he was not taking a spot in the bullpen for granted and that he expected to compete with several other lefties. During spring training, he strained the common flexor tendon in his throwing arm. He underwent Tommy John surgery in April, and missed the 2015 season. After completing a rehabilitation assignment, the Phillies optioned Hollands to Lehigh Valley on June 2, 2016. He was released on May 20, 2017.

=== Player profile ===
A "funky" lefty who "throws hard and looks deceptive," Hollands' fastball hovers around 93 miles per hour (150 km/h) but can modestly exceed that at times, a drastic increase from his velocity while pitching in the minor leagues, and a primary reason for his emergence on the Phillies' major league pitching staff. Secondarily, he throws a slider, that "at its peak, can be impressive". At times, he struggles with his control, and issues walks with relative frequency, but as a young pitcher, shows potential to develop if he can avoid nibbling, and focus on directly attacking hitters with better command of his pitches within the strike zone.

== Personal life ==
Cognizant that there is "life after baseball", in 2013, Hollands enrolled at the Fashion Institute of Design & Merchandising to earn a degree merchandise marketing. He notes that fashion has permeated his life; he grew up in the Bay Area of California, where fashion is "everywhere and a part of everyone's life in some way or another", and worked at an Abercrombie & Fitch store while in high school. He also frequently counsels his teammates on appropriate fashion choices. Fellow reliever Jake Diekman characterized Hollands as having a "really good personality for the bullpen ... I don't know, he just hangs out, he's probably the most chill human being I have ever met in my life." He has even instructed fellow relievers on techniques for folding shirts. Despite earning US$500,000 during his first season, Hollands takes the subway to Citizens Bank Park for Phillies' games. While on the subway, he applies his degree in sociology by studying Philadelphians and their mannerisms.
