= Phar-Mor =

American drug store chain

- Final logo, used from 1999
- Type: Pharmacy
- Industry: Retail
- Founded: 1982
- Defunct: 2002
- Fate: Bankruptcy And Liquidation
- Headquarters: Youngstown, Ohio, U.S.
- Key people: Michael I. Monus, David Shapira
- Products: Pharmacy, Liquor, Cosmetics, Health and Beauty Aids, General Merchandise, Snacks, 1 Hour Photo
- Number of employees: 25,000
- Subsidiaries: The RX Place; Pharm House
- Website: www.phar-mor.com (2001 archive)

Phar-Mor (stylized as PHA℞-MOR) was a United States chain of discount drug stores, based in Youngstown, Ohio, and founded by Michael "Mickey" Monus and David Shapira in 1982. Some of its stores used the names Pharmhouse and Rx Place (purchased in the mid-1990s from the F.W. Woolworth Company). Low prices were advertised to bring in a large volume of sales with the slogans "Phar-Mor power buying gives you Phar-Mor buying power" and "Phar-Mor For Less." Another common slogan in their TV commercials was "Power buying saves: Save at Phar-Mor."

In 1996, the Green Bay, Wisconsin-based regional discount store chain Shopko announced a plan to merge with Phar-Mor, but withdrew from the plan a year later, citing irreconcilable differences.

== Business model ==
Phar-Mor's business model was based on selling a large quantity of merchandise with a very small profit margin. Many products were shipped via direct store delivery, but some were shipped through Tamco warehouses, which Phar-Mor later purchased.

Logo used from 1986-1999

Sam Walton once called Monus the only retailer that he feared, since he couldn't understand how Phar-Mor grew so rapidly in a short time.

== Bankruptcy ==
In 1992, when the company had grown to over 300 stores and 25,000 employees, Monus and his CFO Patrick Finn were accused of embezzlement: they had allegedly hidden losses and moved about $10 million (~$20.6 million in 2025) from Phar-Mor to the World Basketball League that Monus had founded. Based on deceptive data and inventory, Phar-Mor borrowed millions, ostensibly to finance its unusually rapid growth. In actuality, this infusion of cash was necessary to pay off suppliers. As a result, Phar-Mor had to file for bankruptcy protection, closed 55 stores and laid off 5,000 employees. Finn testified against Monus and received 33 months in prison. Monus' first trial ended in a hung jury in 1994. In 1995, he was convicted at the second trial on 109 federal counts, mostly related to fraud, and sentenced to 17 years and 7 months in federal prison. Prosecutors estimated that the total loss to all investors exceeded $1 billion. The sentence was appealed and later reduced to nine years.

Several investors in Phar-Mor filed a civil suit against the company's auditors, Coopers & Lybrand. A jury decided in 1996 that the accountants committed common law and federal securities law fraud by falsely representing they had performed GAAS audits when in fact they had failed to do so.

Phar-Mor emerged from bankruptcy protection in January 1995 with 143 stores remaining, only to be hit hard once again by competition from other large retailers, such as Wal-Mart and Target, which began opening new stores with pharmacies. Phar-Mor, unable to compete, was forced into bankruptcy for the second time in September 2001, only about six and a half years after it had emerged from its prior three-year-long bankruptcy. The company was delisted from the NASDAQ Stock Market on October 10, 2001.

Phar-Mor became weaker during its last years of business. The company tried to return to its Power Buying concept before it had filed for bankruptcy, but to no avail. Without Power Buying, Phar-Mor found itself directly competing with CVS and Walgreens, and lost out because of other chains' convenient locations. Phar-Mor's second bankruptcy was eventually to result in its total liquidation.

In July 2002, a judge in Youngstown approved the sale of Phar-Mor Inc.'s $141 million (~$241 million in 2025) in assets and inventory. Going-out-of-business sales began at the pharmacy chain's remaining 73 stores. Liquidation of Phar-Mor's inventory was handled by The Ozer Group of Needham, Massachusetts and Hilco Merchant Resources of Northbrook, Illinois. Its Youngstown-area assets were purchased by Giant Eagle in bankruptcy court.

The case was featured in an episode of the PBS show Frontline, entitled "How to Steal $500 Million".

The stores in the Youngstown area were eventually sold to Marc's, another discount grocery drugstore chain.
