= Giant Eagle =

American supermarket chain

Giant Eagle, Inc.
- ISIN: US3744561016
- Predecessor: Eagle Grocery (1918–1931); OK Grocery (c. 1922–1931)
- Founded: August 31, 1931
- Founders: Eagle Grocery: Goldstein family Porter family Chaits family; OK Grocery: Moravitz family Weizenbaum family
- Headquarters: Cranberry Township, Pennsylvania, U.S.
- Number of locations: 219 (211 Supermarkets, 8 pharmacies)
- Area served: Pennsylvania, West Virginia, Ohio, Maryland, Indiana
- Key people: Bart Friedman, Executive Chairman; Bill Artman, CEO
- Products: Bakery, dairy, deli, frozen foods, general grocery, meat, pharmacy, produce, seafood, snacks, liquor, lottery tickets, fuel, sushi, Western Union, money orders, dry ice, prepared foods
- Services: Convenience/Forecourt Store, Other Specialty, Supermarket, Gas Stations
- Revenue: ▲US$ 11.1 billion (FY 2022)
- Number of employees: 37,000
- Subsidiaries: Rini-Rego Supermarkets, Inc., Seegrid Corporation.
- Website: gianteagle.com

Giant Eagle, Inc. (Note: Pittsburghese: /dʒaɪn ˈɪɡəl/ JYNE IG-əl) is an American supermarket chain with stores in Pennsylvania, Ohio, West Virginia, Indiana, and Maryland. The company was founded in 1931 and is headquartered in Cranberry Township, Pennsylvania, a suburb of Pittsburgh.

In 2021, Giant Eagle was the 36th-largest privately held company, as determined by Forbes. Its revenue was over US$ 11.1 billion in 2022. As of summer 2025, Giant Eagle had 8 stores across the portfolio: 211 supermarkets (Giant Eagle, Giant Eagle Express, Market District, Market District Express) and 8 standalone pharmacies, having sold off its 274 fuel station/convenience stores under the GetGo banner to Alimentation Couche-Tard.

On July 1, 2026, Kroger announced its intentions to acquire Giant Eagle for $1.65 billion. The deal is expected to close in 2027.

== History ==
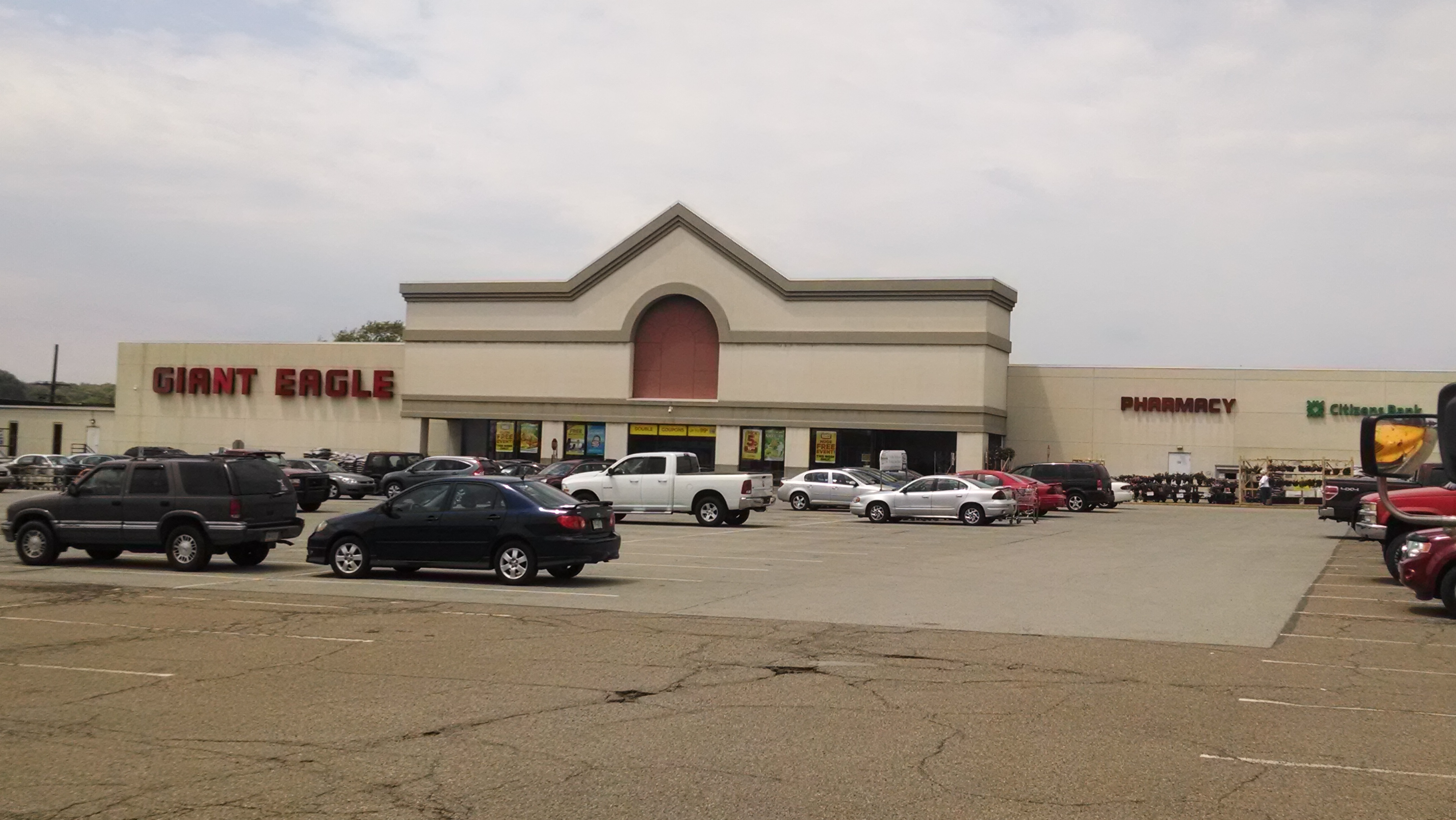
A Giant Eagle store in Economy, Pennsylvania, which closed in 2021.

After World War I, three Pittsburgh-area families—the Goldsteins, Porters, and Chaits—built a grocery chain called Eagle Grocery. In 1928, the company, which at the time had 125 stores, merged with Kroger. The three families agreed to stay out of the grocery business for at least three years.

Meanwhile, the Moravitz and Weizenbaum families built their own successful chain of grocery stores named OK Grocery. In 1931, OK Grocery merged with Eagle Grocery to form Giant Eagle, which was incorporated two years later. The first location opened in 1936. Giant Eagle quickly expanded across western Pennsylvania, weathering the Great Depression and World War II. In 1968, the company acquired a warehouse in Lawrenceville, Pennsylvania formerly owned by Kroger.

The chain remained based solely in western Pennsylvania until the 1980s, when it bought Youngstown, Ohio-based wholesaler Tamarkin Company, and its Valu-King stores that were converted to the Giant Eagle name. The Kent and Ravenna stores were the first to be converted at that time; the Youngstown stores were then converted years later. Giant Eagle first started selling gas in 1995 at a store near Youngstown.

In 1997, it acquired Riser Foods for $403 million. It entered the Cleveland market in 1998, with the acquisition of Rini-Rego Stop-n-Shop. These stores were converted into Giant Eagle Stores. Also in 1998, the company started turning produce into fertilizer. Giant Eagle also purchased other supermarkets in the Akron area.

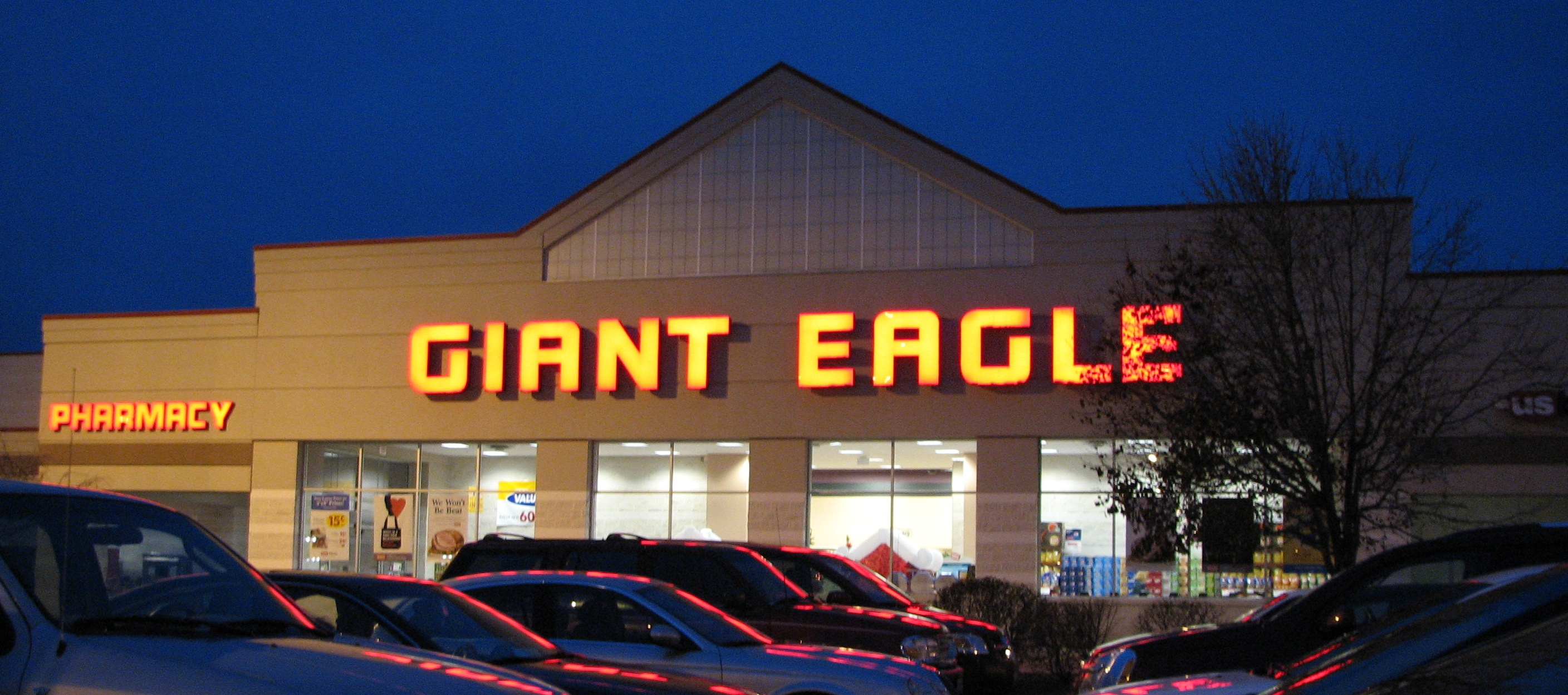
Giant Eagle in Stow, Ohio, with the store prototype used since the late 1990s.

The company entered the Toledo market, opening two stores in 2001 and 2004, both of which eventually closed. Giant Eagle emerged as one of the dominant supermarket chains in Northeast Ohio, competing mainly against the New York-based Tops, from which it purchased 18 stores in October 2006. The purchases came as Tops exited the Northeast Ohio area.

In 2002, Giant Eagle purchased six independently owned County Market stores, giving it a store in Somerset, Pennsylvania, a new store in Johnstown, Pennsylvania, and its first Maryland stores: one in Cumberland, one in Hagerstown, and two in Frederick. The Cumberland store closed in December 2003, and the Hagerstown store closed in August 2005.

Giant Eagle has aggressively expanded its footprint in the Greater Columbus area, capitalizing on the demise of the former Big Bear supermarket chain, and taking Big Bear's traditional place as Columbus's upmarket grocer. Giant Eagle first entered what it calls its "Columbus Region" in late 2000, opening three large newly built stores at Sawmill and Bethel Rd., Lewis Center, and Dublin-Granville Rd., with two more following in 2002 and 2003 at Gahanna and Hilliard-Rome Rd. The Hilliard-Rome Rd. location closed in early 2017. In 2004, Giant Eagle purchased nine former Big Bear stores in Columbus, Newark, and Marietta from parent company Penn Traffic. Giant Eagle has since expanded to several additional locations, acquiring other abandoned Big Bear stores and in newly constructed buildings using the current Giant Eagle prototype. Giant Eagle opened its 20th Columbus-area store at New Albany Road at the Ohio Rt. 161 freeway (New Albany) in August 2007, its 21st area store at Hayden Run and Cosgray Roads (Dublin) in November 2007, its 22nd area store at Stelzer and McCutcheon Roads (Columbus) in July 2008 and its 23rd area store at South Hamilton Road and Winchester Pike (Groveport) in August 2008. A new Giant Eagle opened in Lancaster, in November 2008, and the former Big Bear located at Blacklick Crossing has undergone an expansion and remodeling.

On September 27, 2018, Giant Eagle announced it would purchase the Ricker's convenience store chain in Indiana, marking the largest acquisition for GetGo since the chain's launch. It is not known if the Ricker's chain will be integrated into the GetGo brand following the closure of the deal. Much as it has done in Pennsylvania alongside Sheetz, GetGo plans to join Ricker's in having Indiana change their laws regarding alcohol sales.

In 2023, the company parted ways with Laura Shapira Karet who was both chairman of the board and CEO. Bart Friedman was appointed chairman. This marked the first time in the company's history when the chairman was not a member of one of the five founding families. In addition, Bill Artman was appointed CEO, which marks the first time the position was not held by a member of the Shapira family since 1968.

In August 2024, Giant Eagle reached a deal to sell GetGo to Alimentation Couche-Tard, the parent company of Circle K, which finalized on June 29, 2025. Giant Eagle, which initially approached Couche-Tard about offering some private label items in their standard Circle K stores before Couche-Tard countered by offering to buy GetGo, used the proceeds to reinvest in their standard supermarkets as well as expand in its pharmacy business following the collapse of Pennsylvania-based Rite Aid.

On July 1, 2026, Cincinnati-based Kroger announced the acquisition of Giant Eagle for $1.25 billion in cash. The purchase is expected to be completed in 2027.

== Loyalty program ==
In 1991, Giant Eagle introduced the Advantage Card, an electronic loyalty card discount system (already popular in many chains), as a sophisticated version of the obsolete stamp programs. The card was later modified to double as a video rental card for Iggle Video.

The company began the Fuelperks! program, allowing customers the opportunity to earn 10 cents off each gallon of gas at GetGo fuel stations. In early 2009, Giant Eagle launched the Foodperks! program, mainly geared towards GetGo, allowing customers who use their Fuelperks! at GetGo to also save on groceries at Giant Eagle. In February 2013, Giant Eagle discontinued the Foodperks! program because it was "a little too complex".

In 2017, Giant Eagle changed Fuelperks! to Fuelperks+ and reintroduced the benefits of Foodperks!. Under the new program, among other benefits, customers earned points by shopping at Giant Eagle, Market District, or GetGo stores and by filling prescriptions at Giant Eagle Pharmacies. These points could be redeemed to save on groceries and gas.

In late 2021, Giant Eagle began to roll out another new system, myPerks and myPerks Pro, which allows customers to take advantage of exclusive sale prices and earn bonus points. Switching from Fuelperks+ to myPerks became an option for all customers in 2022.

Giant Eagle retired its longtime Fuelperks+ program on January 25, 2024. All existing Fuelperks+ customers were merged into the new myPerks program.

== Operations ==
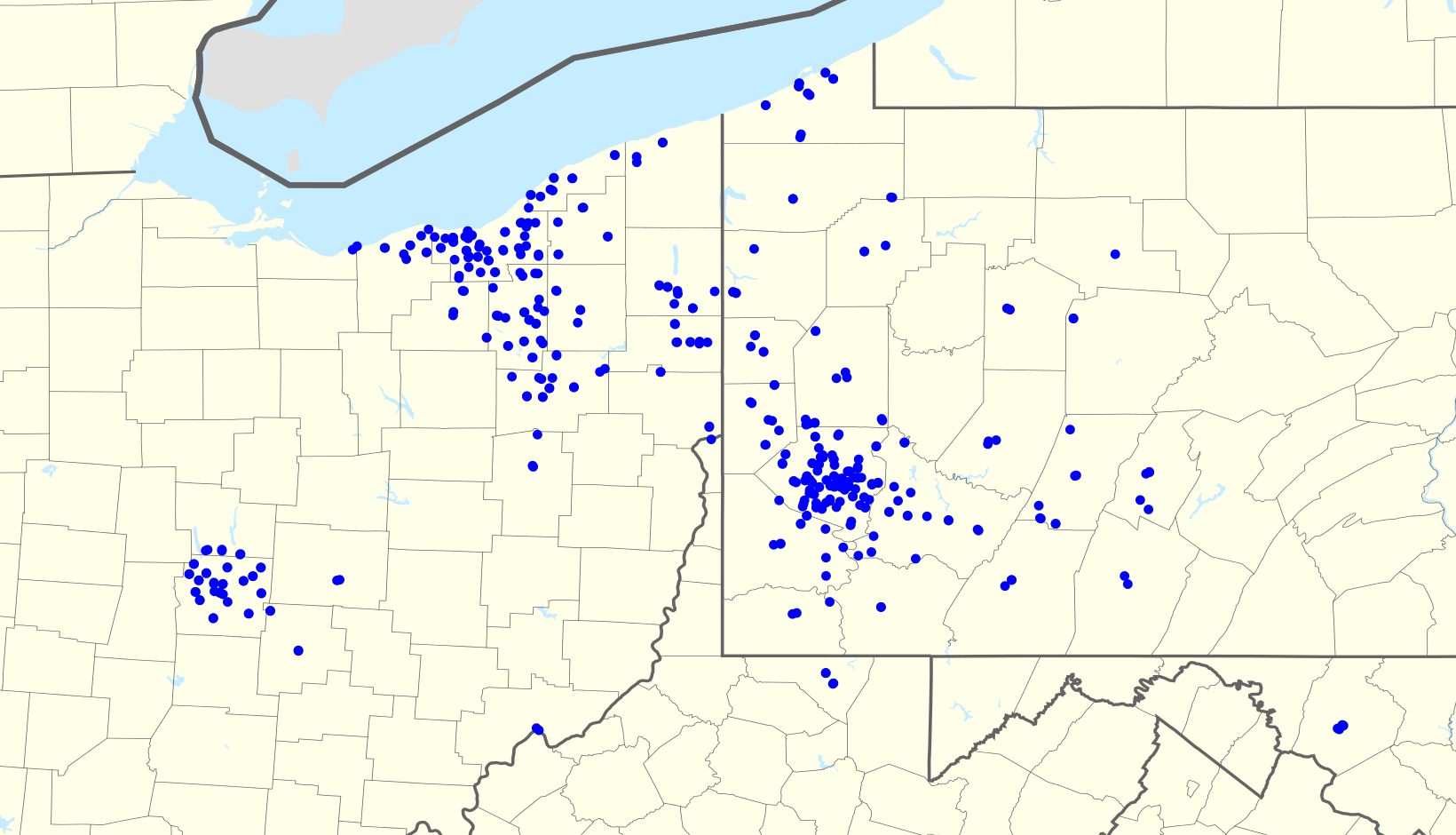
Map of Giant Eagle stores

There are 211 Giant Eagle locations in the United States: 103 supermarkets in western Pennsylvania, 111 in northeastern and central Ohio, two in Morgantown, West Virginia, two in Frederick, Maryland and one in Carmel, Indiana. Each store carries between 22,000 and 60,000 items, approximately 5,000 of which are branded by Giant Eagle.

Giant Eagle offers more than two dozen departments across its stores. The range of services includes Redbox video terminals, Happy Returns, dry cleaning, Bissell carpet cleaner rental, Primo Water, lottery, the Flashfood app, Coinstar, grocery pickup and delivery, and pharmacies. Giant Eagle also has banking partnerships with Citizens Bank in Pennsylvania and Huntington Bank in Ohio and West Virginia.

The chain has built large prototypes, and it has experimented with many departments unusual to supermarkets. Larger stores feature vast selections of ethnic and organic food, dry cleaning services, catering, drive-thru pharmacies, in-store banking, as well as in-store coffee shops, pubs, restaurants, and prepared foods. Prepared foods are also sold at larger GetGo locations that can accommodate a GetGo Kitchen.

Although older Giant Eagle locations tend to be unionized and some are even franchised stores, in recent years the company has started leaning toward non-union company-owned and operated stores. Prior to the sale of GetGo to Couche-Tard, Giant Eagle operated any GetGo directly that was near a franchised Giant Eagle as opposed to the franchisee itself.

=== Current brands ===
==== Market District ====
Giant Eagle rebranded some of its stores as Market District in an attempt to attract upscale shoppers. The initial two stores opened in June 2006 in the Shadyside neighborhood of Pittsburgh and Bethel Park, just outside Pittsburgh. Since that time, additional Giant Eagle locations were renovated into the Market District format or constructed as newly build locations. There are now 21 stores under this brand. The 21st store opened in Westfield, Indiana in 2024, which is the chain's second location in the Indianapolis market.

An additional Market District store is under construction in Pittsburgh as the replacement for the previous Giant Eagle location on Shakespeare Street. That location was demolished to make way for the new Meridian mixed use development.

==== Giant Eagle Express ====
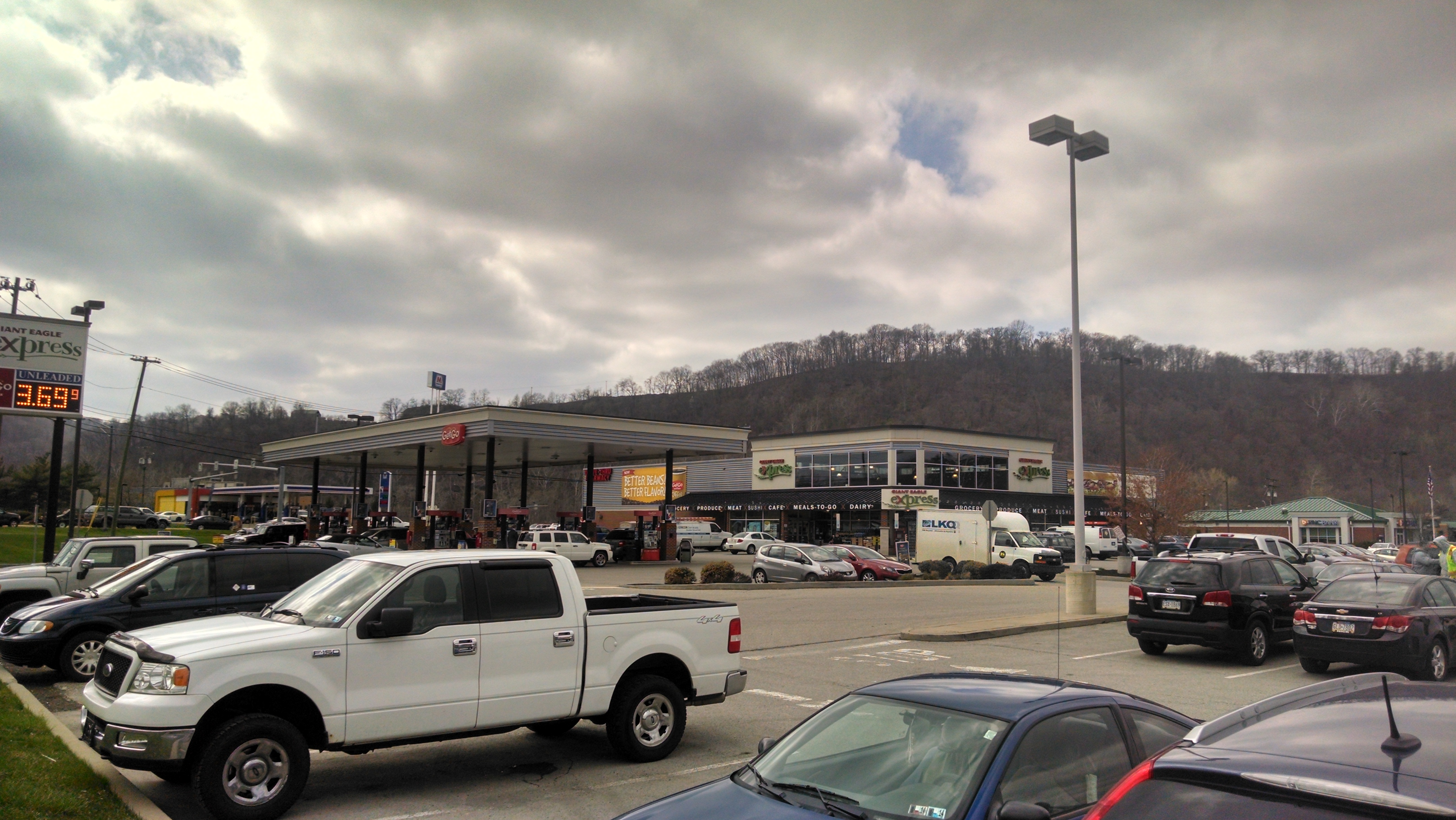
Giant Eagle Express in Harmar Township, Pennsylvania

Giant Eagle Express is a concept store. As of May 2016, the only operating store is in Harmar Township, Pennsylvania. An Indiana, Pennsylvania location closed its doors in 2015. The store is larger than a GetGo, but much smaller than a regular Giant Eagle supermarket store. However, the store offers many of the same services as a Giant Eagle, such as a deli and a drive-through pharmacy. Giant Eagle Express also offers a café with prepared sandwiches, Giant Eagle's own Market District coffee, salad bar, and a wireless internet connection. There is also a GetGo gas station.

==== Market District Express ====
In 2013, Giant Eagle announced their Market District Express concept, a hybrid of the flagship Market District format launched in 2013 and the Giant Eagle Express format launched in 2007. The first of this brand's stores opened on December 5, 2013, in Peters Township, Pennsylvania. The second Market District Express store opened on August 18, 2016, in Bexley, Ohio. The Bexley location is notable as it features a full restaurant and bar inside, alongside groceries in a 30,000 square foot store that spans two floors.

==== Giant Eagle Pharmacy ====
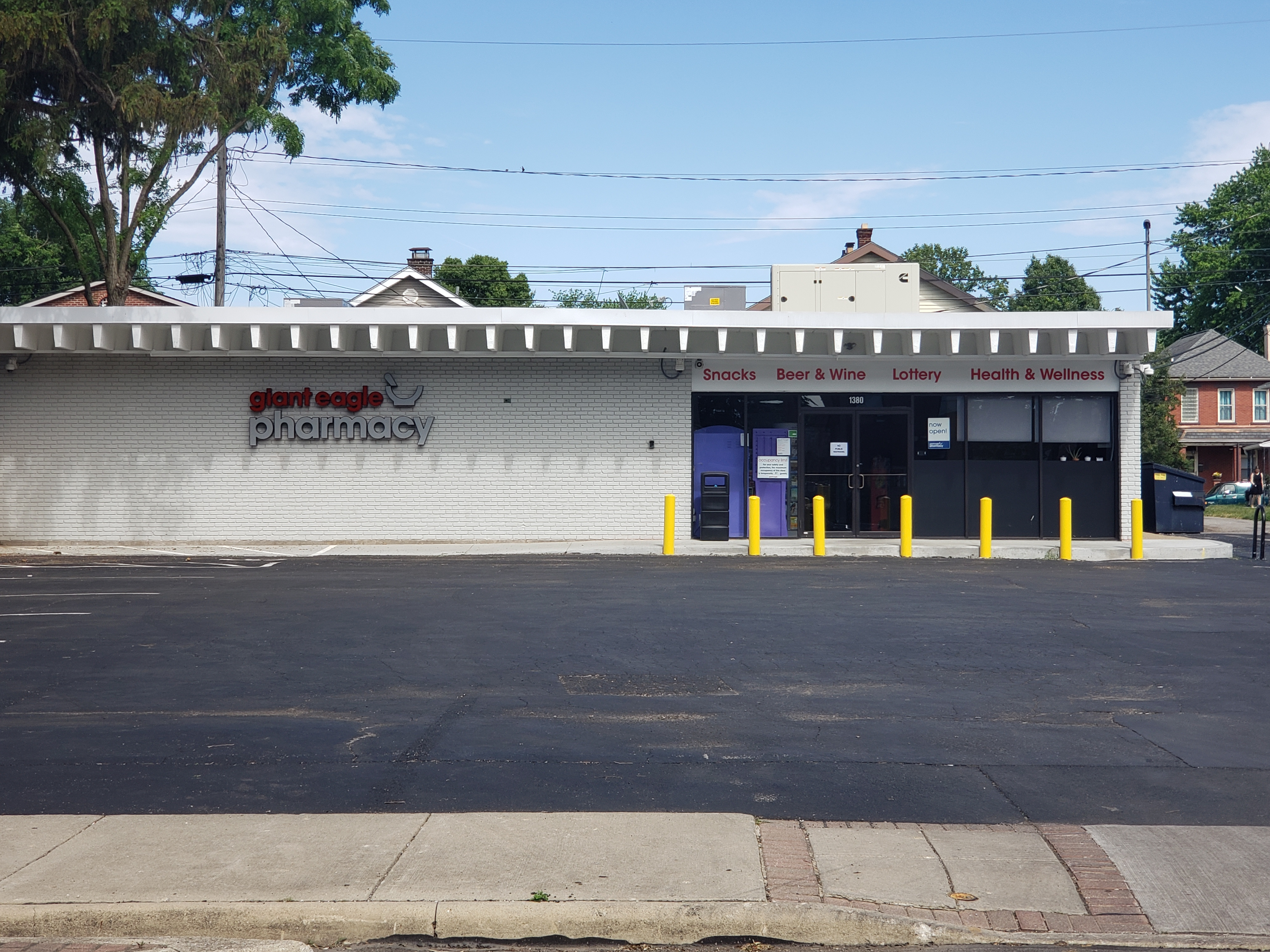
A standalone Giant Eagle Pharmacy in Columbus, Ohio

Giant Eagle began adding pharmacies to their stores in the 1980s, along with other "store-within-a-store" concepts photo, floral, and video rental. Giant Eagle Pharmacy also offers several immunizations throughout the year for pneumonia, influenza, and Shingrix. These are typically walk-in, but vary depending on the pharmacists available.

Until 2021, all Giant Eagle Pharmacy locations were located inside standard Giant Eagle and Market District locations. This changed when a standalone Giant Eagle Pharmacy opened in Columbus's German Village neighborhood after Giant Eagle opted not to renew its lease at the existing Giant Eagle location in the area, allowing for the property to be redeveloped. The location opened in a former Lawson's, and assumed the prescription accounts from the previous location.

Following the second bankruptcy and liquidation of Rite Aid, Giant Eagle has been gradually opening more standalone pharmacy locations to fill the void left by Rite Aid, acquiring the patient records of 83 Rite Aid locations as well as at least two Rite Aid locations to be converted into Giant Eagle Pharmacy locations in mid-2025.

==== Giant Eagle Contact Lenses ====
Giant Eagle partnered with Arlington Lens Supply in 2010 to sell contact lenses online via their website.

==== Starbucks ====
Giant Eagle has a contract to operate Starbucks kiosks in some of its stores; the workers are employed by Giant Eagle, but become certified baristas after completing the process.

==== Ace Hardware ====
Giant Eagle has six stores that contain a franchise of Ace Hardware. These locations offer nearly all of the same products that would be found in a standalone Ace Hardware store. All locations have a hardware store, paint mixing services, and a wide variety of hardware products. All six stores are located in the Pittsburgh market. The latest store with Ace Hardware opened in Rochester, Pennsylvania, in the spring of 2022.

=== Defunct brands ===
==== Phar-Mor ====
Giant Eagle was the largest shareholder of the Phar-Mor chain during its heyday in the 1980s and 1990s, although it was operated separate from the main Giant Eagle chain. The Shapira family who owns Giant Eagle provided Phar-Mor founder Mickey Monus with the financing necessary to start his chain. After Monus was convicted of embezzlement, Phar-Mor filed for bankruptcy and eventually liquidated. Due to Giant Eagle's stake in Phar-Mor, it was able to acquire Phar-Mor's Youngstown-area assets in bankruptcy court after the chain liquidated.

==== Iggle Video ====
Giant Eagle once operated Iggle Video locations inside many of its locations to serve as its video rental shop. Like Giant Eagle Pharmacy, Iggle Video (which spelled "eagle" from its phonetic pronunciation in Pittsburghese, even outside of Pittsburgh) never operated in stand-alone locations. Like other video rental chains, Iggle Video offered movie and video game rentals. They also served as the local Ticketmaster outlet in the Pittsburgh region before Ticketmaster phased out physical ticket locations outside venue box offices. In the mid- to late 2000s, Giant Eagle phased these stores out in favor of Redbox automated retail machines, with Ticketmaster sales moved to the customer service desk.

==== Giant Eagle Optical ====
In October 2004, Giant Eagle began a long-term experiment with in-store optometry centers dubbed "Giant Eagle Optical". There were four locations in the Pittsburgh area: North Hills (McIntyre Square), South Hills (Donaldson's Crossroads), east (Monroeville), and west (Robinson). The stores accepted most major vision plans and offered a wide variety of designer frames, as well as exclusive Giant Eagle brands. They also participated in the Fuelperks! program and were staffed mostly by ABO-certified opticians. Noting that "some programs don't prove viable across a broad number of stores", Giant Eagle chose to close its Optical locations beginning in August 2009.

==== Valu King and Good Cents ====
Valu King logo

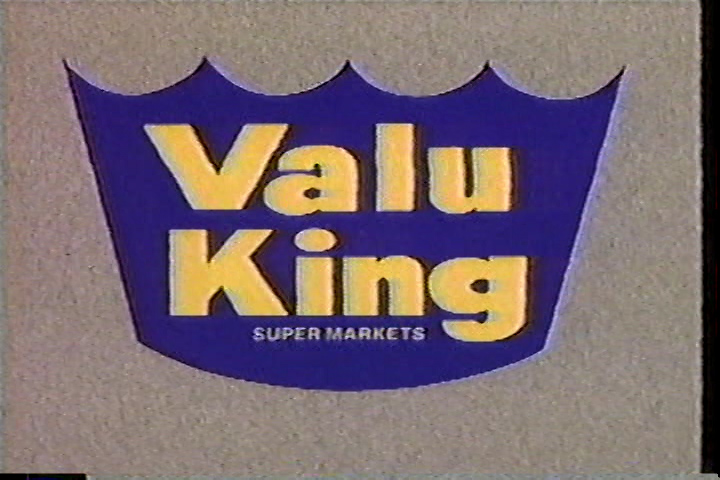
Valu King 1989

In December 2008, Giant Eagle opened the rebranded Valu King supermarket in Eastlake, Ohio. The Valu King name dates back to the 1980s. The rebranded Valu King operated stores in Eastlake, Ravenna, and Brooklyn in Ohio and Johnstown and Erie in Pennsylvania, with the most recent store opened in May 2012.

In 2012, Giant Eagle opened a new low-cost supermarket concept called Good Cents, located in Ross Township, Pennsylvania. The concept is similar to that of a Valu King, but carries a slightly larger product selection. Good Cents eventually replaced all rebranded Valu King as Giant Eagle's low-cost brand.

Good Cents and Valu King both were no frills stores designed to compete with similar stores such as Aldi, Save-A-Lot, and Bottom Dollar Food.

On February 25, 2015, Giant Eagle announced it would close all the Good Cents stores by the end of March. It was looking for open spots at nearby Giant Eagle locations for displaced employees.

On March 2, 2015, all Good Cents stores were sold and closed.

== Employees ==
Giant Eagle has about 32,000 employees and many of them are unionized under United Food and Commercial Workers Local 1776ks of Pittsburgh, AFGE and UFCW Local 880 of Cleveland. The Maryland and Columbus stores are not unionized, much like some independently owned stores throughout Pennsylvania and the Youngstown, Ohio area. Some employees in the Eagle's Nest and Photo Lab departments are also nonunion employees.

== Advertising ==
Currently, Giant Eagle uses the advertising slogan "That's my Giant Eagle." It's similar to the previous campaign used from 2015-2024, but focuses more on store employees, services, and vendor partners that provide products to the stores. In addition, the slogan is now used across the GetGo and Market District store chains, providing a unified campaign across all of Giant Eagle's store brands for the first time.

From 2015-2024, Giant Eagle used the slogan "That's Another Giant Eagle Advantage" with its advertising, focusing on the eAdvantage offer of the week. This campaign featured store employees and customers, that put their own spin on what Giant Eagle offers. The campaign includes a focus on product selection, quality, customer service, and price leadership.

From 2011 to 2014 the slogan was "That's my Giant Eagle Advantage". From 2009 until 2011, the slogan was "Low prices. Uncompromising quality." In December 2009, a variation being used was "Lower prices. Uncompromising quality." for online advertisements on thepittsburghchannel.com website.

From 2001 until 2009, the slogan "Make every day taste better", was used. It was meant to showcase product quality as compared to the convenience focus used in the previous campaign.

From 1993 until 2001, "it takes a giant to make life simple" was used as the slogan. This was focused on convenience, and spawned the "Fee Fi Fo Fum" commercials. The commercials featured everything from the general store, the produce and deli departments to a spot featuring Jay Bell and Jeff King of the Pittsburgh Pirates. This replaced the previous "A lot you can feel good about ... especially the price" motto.

The chain, under pressure from Wal-Mart, has implemented a lower-prices campaign throughout its stores, featured on products that customers buy most. Giant Eagle also sells Topco-produced Valu Time products, which are substantially cheaper than other private-label and name-brand merchandise. These co-exist with the Giant Eagle branded items, which are priced lower than national brands, yet higher than Valu Time. Before these brands existed, Giant Eagle generally used Topco's Food Club label as the generic product.

== Criticism ==
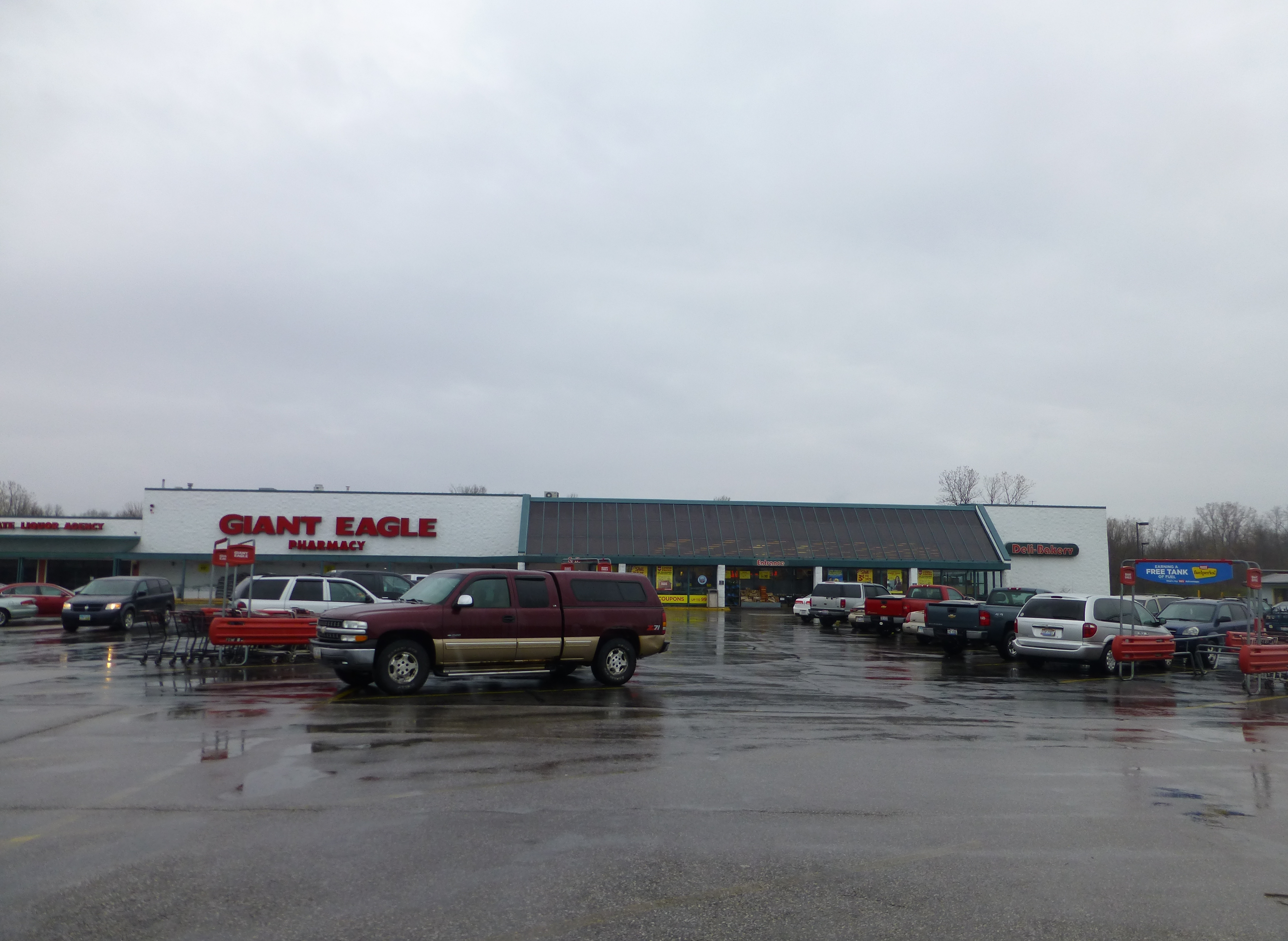
Former Kroger store now occupied by Giant Eagle in Vermilion, Ohio

Until 2022, Giant Eagle had the highest market share of any supermarket chain in the Pittsburgh area, giving it a de facto monopoly in some parts of western Pennsylvania; only stores supplied by United Natural Foods (UNFI) such as Shop 'n Save, FoodLand, and County Market have much of a presence in the area. The construction of new supercenters, including Walmart and others, and no frills supermarkets such as Aldi attracting value-seeking customers have somewhat decreased Giant Eagle's regional market share in the first decades of the twenty-first century.

Giant Eagle's market dominance in Greater Pittsburgh has led to accusations of the company buying up either existing supermarket locations or prime real estate for the sole purpose of not allowing a competitor come in. A notable example came in 2016, when the chain purchased property in McCandless, Pennsylvania, that had been planned for a Walmart location near an existing Giant Eagle; Walmart later backed out and Giant Eagle made no immediate announcement of plans for the property. The deal came only weeks after Giant Eagle laid off 350 workers from its corporate office. Giant Eagle was also successful in blocking a Walmart location opening at the dilapidated Northern Lights Shopping Center in Economy, Pennsylvania, though Walmart eventually opened a location on the hillside behind the property in 2014 after finding a loophole around Giant Eagle's lease at Northern Lights; Giant Eagle ultimately closed this location on January 2, 2021.

During Giant Eagle's ownership of GetGo, similar accusations were also made about GetGo not allowing Sheetz or Speedway opening up locations within the Pittsburgh city limits while GetGo has, although both competitor chains have several locations within the immediate suburbs. 7-Eleven's 2021 acquisition of Speedway made the issue partially moot as 7-Eleven has operated multiple locations within the Pittsburgh city limits for decades, though Sheetz remained "locked out" by GetGo. Aside from 7-Eleven, locally-based Coen Markets also operated within the Pittsburgh city limits during Giant Eagle's ownership, while Couche-Tard had previously closed or sold off the handful of Circle K locations it did have within the Pittsburgh city limits prior to acquiring GetGo. Two months after the sale of GetGo to Couche-Tard closed, Sheetz announced it would build a location in Pittsburgh's Banksville neighborhood, marking Sheetz's first location in the Pittsburgh city limits since the 1990s.

Before Walmart, Giant Eagle's last nationally-significant competitor in the Pittsburgh market was Kroger, which had bought the original Eagle but exited Western Pennsylvania in 1984 due to labor issues with its union as well as the local economy at the time. Many Giant Eagle locations in Pennsylvania and Northeast Ohio occupy former Kroger sites and used the distinctive Kroger prototypes from the 1980s with the sloped glass-roof entrance until most of the stores were remodeled or replaced with newer stores in the early 2000s with Giant Eagle's current prototype. Kroger and Giant Eagle still compete head-to-head in Morgantown, Columbus and Indianapolis.

Despite the perceived monopoly, Giant Eagle holds only a 32% market share in Pittsburgh as of August 2018, just barely edging out Walmart. In 2022, Giant Eagle fell behind Walmart, leaving open the possibility of a return of Kroger to the area or Meijer moving in. Giant Eagle has been rated as the worst grocer in the country according to 2026 data from the American Customer Satisfaction Index.
