= Jerry McMorris =

American baseball executive (1940–2012)

- Born: Jerry Dean McMorris; October 9, 1940; Rock Island, Illinois, U.S.
- Died: May 8, 2012 (aged 71); Aurora, Colorado, U.S.
- Resting place: Mount Olivet Cemetery; Wheat Ridge, Colorado, U.S.
- Occupation: Businessman
- Years active: 1992–2005
- Known for: Colorado Rockies owner and operator

Jerry Dean McMorris (October 9, 1940 – May 8, 2012) was an American principal owner and operator of the Colorado Rockies of the National League from 1992 through 2005.

== Early life ==
McMorris was born in Rock Island, Illinois. He worked for his dad at D-C Trucking before deciding to go on his own and form his own trucking company with Westway Motor Freight, which later became NW Transport and NationsWay Transport. They filed for Chapter 11 bankruptcy in May 1999.

== Ownership ==
On July 5, 1991, Denver was announced as an expansion team in Major League Baseball. McMorris was a limited partner in the ownership group that had Michael I. Monus as the intended owner (with a business partner in John Antonucci). However, Monus was embroiled in an accounting scandal that doomed him before he ever saw a game. By February 1993, he already had been forced to release his stake in the Rockies and indicted by a federal grand jury for embezzlement. The team was short $20 million in the expansion fee of $95 million, and there were rumblings of trying to sell the team to Tampa, Florida. McMorris spearheaded an effort to help raise the money, bringing in meatpacking heir Charlie Monfort and Oren Benton as part of the group. With all in hand, the Rockies were ready for their inaugural season with Bob Gebhard as general manager and Don Baylor as manager.

From 1993 to 1999, the Rockies led Major League Baseball in attendance, starting with their inaugural year that saw 4,483,350 fans go to Mile High Stadium (used by the team for the first two seasons), a major league record that still stands. Coors Field opened in 1995 as the first National League park built primarily for baseball since the 1960s (the effort to fundraise for the park had started with Monus). The park saw playoff action in its first season and hosted the 1998 Major League Baseball All-Star Game. His tenure as owner was characterized by a desire to win despite the fact that the franchise had to deal with pitching troubles that arose from the high elevation in Denver, which namely meant McMorris trying to give large contracts to pitchers to try to counter the hitting; an example of this process was Denny Neagle, Mike Hampton, and Darryl Kile. The crash of his trucking business in 1999 led to him selling portions of the team to the Monfort brothers (Charlie and Dick) which gave them over 40 percent ownership. In 2001, he stepped down as team president but remained as chief executive officer. In the fall of 2004, McMorris was removed as vice chairman by the Monforts. In 2005, McMorris sold the final stake of the franchise to the Monforts. From 1993 to 2005, the Rockies had a winning season just four times with one playoff appearance through four managers; the Rockies never won more than 83 games in any season of his tenure as owner.

He was inducted into the Colorado Sports Hall of Fame in 2009.

== Personal life and death ==
Jerry met his wife Mary in 1962 and had two sons and a daughter: Michael Dean McMorris (1964–1996) Scott and Kelly. McMorris served as chairman of the Western Stock Show Association for six years and on the executive committee for 18 years.

McMorris died on May 8, 2012, from pancreatic cancer at the age of 71 at the University of Colorado Hospital in Aurora, Colorado.

== Notes ==
Sporting positions
Preceded by None	Colorado Rockies; Owner and Operator; 1992–2005	Succeeded by Monfort brothers
Preceded by None	Colorado Rockies; President; 1992–2001	Succeeded by Keli McGregor
