= Dan O'Dowd =

American baseball manager and executive (born 1959)

- Born: September 6, 1959 (age 66); Montville, New Jersey, U.S.
- Education: Rollins College
- Occupation: General Manager
- Organizations: Colorado Rockies (1999–2014)

Dan O'Dowd (born September 6, 1959) is an American former general manager of the Colorado Rockies from September 20, 1999, to October 8, 2014. Before being hired by the Rockies, he spent 15 years working for the Baltimore Orioles and Cleveland Indians, working his way from accounts manager to director of baseball operations / assistant general manager.

== Biography ==
O'Dowd was raised in Montville, New Jersey and graduated from Montville Township High School in 1976.

The results of O'Dowd's GM career have been mixed. Upon taking over the team, he traded fading stars Dante Bichette, Vinny Castilla, and Darryl Kile, opting to build a team around pitching, speed and defense. The following season, after a surprising 82–80 run, O'Dowd signed pitchers Denny Neagle and Mike Hampton to long-term contracts. The acquisitions turned out to be disastrous for the club and were two of the worst free-agency signings in baseball history. Afterwards, O'Dowd attempted to shed salary and build a foundation of young talent around franchise cornerstone Todd Helton. Under his watch, the team developed players such as Matt Holliday, Troy Tulowitzki, Jeff Francis, and Ubaldo Jiménez.

The 2007 season was arguably the most surprising run by any Rockies team, as the team won 21 of their last 22 games to force a tiebreaker against the San Diego Padres. The Rockies, who were making their first playoff appearance in 12 years, swept both the Philadelphia Phillies and Arizona Diamondbacks en route to the 2007 World Series, before losing to the Boston Red Sox. O'Dowd was rewarded with a contract extension following the team's successful playoff run. As the Rockies struggled in 2012, the Rockies restructured their front office, making Bill Geivett their director of major league operations, though O'Dowd retained the title of general manager. Following the 2014 season O'Dowd was offered a contract extension but declined the deal when he was not allowed to replace Geivett. The Rockies promoted Jeff Bridich to the role of general manager, and Geivett resigned, upset he did not get promoted to the role of GM.

O'Dowd currently serves as an analyst for MLB Network.
