= Dave Walsh (baseball) =

American baseball player (born 1960)

- Pitcher
- Born: September 25, 1960 (age 65); Arlington, Massachusetts, U.S.
- Batted: Right Threw: Left

MLB debut
- August 13, 1990, for the Los Angeles Dodgers

Last MLB appearance
- October 2, 1990, for the Los Angeles Dodgers

MLB statistics
- Win–loss record: 1–0
- Earned run average: 3.86
- Strikeouts: 15
- Stats at Baseball Reference

Teams
- Los Angeles Dodgers (1990)

David Peter Walsh (born September 25, 1960) is an American former professional baseball pitcher. Walsh pitched in 20 games for the Los Angeles Dodgers of Major League Baseball during the 1990 baseball season.

== Early life and education ==
He graduated from El Camino Real High School (Woodland Hills, California) in 1978, where he played varsity baseball and earned All-Los Angeles City honors as a pitcher in his senior year. He went on to play baseball at the University of California, Santa Barbara, (UCSB).

== Playing career ==
Walsh was drafted by the Toronto Blue Jays in the ninth round (212th overall) of the 1982 Major League Baseball draft. He played multiple seasons in the Mexican League and was a member of Tecolotes de los Dos Laredos and Potros de Tijuana.

He made his MLB debut with the Los Angeles Dodgers in August 1990 and appeared in 20 games during the 1990 Major League Baseball season.

== Post-playing career ==
Walsh became a teacher in Oklahoma and coached baseball. As a coach, he was an assistant with NCAA Division II Oklahoma Christian Eagles from 2014 to 2016. He rejoined the staff in 2022.

Before making the collegiate ranks, he was a teacher and the pitching coach at Edmond Santa Fe High School for 15 years. He has taught at Harding Charter Preparatory High School. He currently teaches at Deer Creek High School (Edmond, Oklahoma) as the AP English Language and Composition and English IV teacher.

== Personal life ==
Walsh, like his father, struggled with addiction.
