= Bill Geivett =

American baseball player & executive (born 1963)

- Born: July 25, 1963 (age 63)
- Education: Sacramento City College, University of California, Santa Barbara
- Occupation: Director of major league operations
- Years active: 2012–2014
- Organization: Colorado Rockies

William Paige Geivett (born July 25, 1963) is an American professional baseball player and executive.

== Career ==
Geivett attended Sacramento City College and the University of California, Santa Barbara (UCSB). Playing college baseball for the UCSB Gauchos, Geivett was named an All-American. He played minor league baseball for the California Angels organization from 1985 through 1988, retiring after suffering a knee injury.

After retiring as a player, Geivett coached for Loyola Marymount University in 1989 and Long Beach State University in 1990. Geivett became a scout and instructor for the New York Yankees organization in 1991. From 1994 through 1996, he was in charge of the farm system of the Montreal Expos, which was named organization of the year by Topps in 1996. He was next named special assistant to the general manager of the Tampa Bay Devil Rays, joining the Los Angeles Dodgers organization in 1998, serving as assistant general manager. The Colorado Rockies hired Geivett from the Dodgers in 2000, naming him their director of player personnel. In October 2002, he was named the club's director of minor league operations. He was promoted to assistant general manager in 2005.

In 2012, Rockies owner Dick Monfort restructured the team's front office, making Geivett essentially their "director of major league operations", breaking with baseball tradition by attempting to phase out the traditional model of a baseball front office. While Dan O'Dowd retained the title of general manager, the Rockies attempted to shift the paradigm of the front office by creating a new and unique position for Geivett, who assumed many of the roles traditionally held by the general manager. He also undertook many of the roles of the field manager, as he oversees the team on a day-to-day basis from an office in the team clubhouse. Geivett and O'Dowd resigned on October 8, 2014; they were succeeded by Jeff Bridich.
