= Joe Redfield =

American baseball player (born 1961)

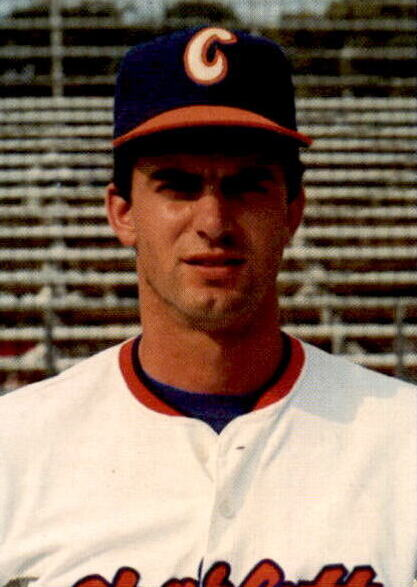
- Redfield with the Charlotte O's c. 1986
- Third baseman
- Born: January 14, 1961 (age 65); Doylestown, Pennsylvania, U.S.
- Batted: Right Threw: Right

MLB debut
- June 4, 1988, for the California Angels

Last MLB appearance
- July 15, 1991, for the Pittsburgh Pirates

MLB statistics
- Batting average: .100
- Home runs: 0
- Runs batted in: 0
- Stats at Baseball Reference

Teams
- California Angels (1988); Pittsburgh Pirates (1991)

Joseph Randall Redfield (born January 14, 1961) is an American former professional baseball third baseman. He is an alumnus of the University of California, Santa Barbara.

His son of the same name, Joe Redfield, was drafted by the Los Angeles Angels in the 4th round of the 2023 Major League Baseball draft.

== Career ==
Redfield was drafted by the New York Mets in the 9th round of the 1982 Major League Baseball draft, then traded to the Baltimore Orioles for a minor leaguer in 1986. After being drafted in the 1986 rule 5 draft by the Atlanta Braves, Redfield would be traded to the California Angels for Stan Cliburn and make his MLB debut with the Angels on June 4, 1988. He appeared in his final game on July 15, 1991 for the Pittsburgh Pirates.
